= List of islands of the Channel Islands =

This is a list of islands within the Channel Islands in the English Channel off the coast of Normandy. This group of islands includes the Bailiwick of Guernsey, the Bailiwick of Jersey and Chausey.

== Inhabited islands ==
Name	Image	Coordinates	Population	Area (hectares)	Elevation (metres)
Alderney			2167 (Mar 2023)	780 (Note: Change in units: quantity in square kilometre has been automatically converted to hectare for uniformity.)	90
Sark			562 (Apr 2022)	550	114
Herm			60 (2002)	200	66
Guernsey			63276 (2019)	6,340	110
Jersey			105500 (Dec 2017)	11,820	143
Grande-Île			30	45	31

== Uninhabited islands in the Bailiwick of Guernsey ==
Uninhabited islands, islets and rock formations include the following:

=== Islets around Alderney ===
Name	Image	Coordinates	Area (hectares)
Burhou			13
Ortac			
Les Casquets			
Houmet des Pies			
Raz			
L'Etac de la Quoiré			
Clonque Rock			
Renonquet			
Coque Lihou			
Corbet Rock			
Fourquie			
Houmet Herbé			
Le Puits Jervais			
L'Equêt			
Les Etacs			
Les Homeaux Florains			

=== Islets around Sark ===
Name	Image	Coordinates	Area (hectares)
Brecqhou			35.2
Les Burons			
Baleine			
Moie de Breniere			
Moie de Port Gorey			
Moie de la Bretagne			
Moie de la Fontaine			
Tintageu			
Les Autelets			
Bec du Nez			
L'Etac			
Moie du Mouton			
La Grune			
Courbée du Nez			

=== Islets around Herm ===
Name	Image	Coordinates	Area (hectares)
Caquorobert			
Jethou			18 (Note: Change in units: quantity in acre has been automatically converted to hectare for uniformity.)
Crevichon			3.0
Grande Fauconnière			
Goubinuere			
Homet			
La Conchée			
Godin			
Hermetier			

=== Islets around Guernsey ===
Name	Image	Coordinates	Area (hectares)
Lihou			15
Lihoumel			
Houmets			
Brehon			
Les Hanois			
La Grosse Rock			
Crève Coeur			
Cul de l'Autel			
La Conchée			
La Platte Fougère			

== Uninhabited islands in the Bailiwick of Jersey ==
The Bailiwick includes the uninhabited (or nearly uninhabited) islands and islets of:

Name	Image	Coordinates	Area (hectares)	Notes
Minquiers				Other islets nearby include Maîtresse Île / Maîtr' Île, Les Maisons, Le Niêsant, Les Faucheurs, La Haute Grune
Écréhous				Other islets nearby include Maîtr'Île, La Marmotchiéthe, Lé Bliantch'Île, Les D'mies, La Grand' Naithe, L'Êtchièrviéthe, Lé Fou, La Froutchie
Les Dirouilles				
Pierres de Lecq				Other islets nearby include L'Êtchièrviéthe; La Rocque du Nord; L'Êtaîse or L'Êtaîthe; Lé Bel; Lé Longis; La P'tite Mathe; La Grôsse (Great Rock); La Grand' Mathe; La Greune dé Lé or La Bonnette; La Greune du Seur-Vouêt; L'Orange; La Vouêtaîse, La Vouêtaîthe or La Vouêt'rêsse; La Cappe; La Douoche; Lé Byi; La Rocque Mollet; L'Êtché au Nord-Vouêt; La Galette; La Briarde; La Sprague; La Niêthole Jean Jean or Lé Gouoillot.
Île Agois				
La Motte				Tidal island, also known as Green Island.
L'Islet				Site of Elizabeth Castle.
Île au Guerdain				Site of Janvrin's Tomb.
Icho				Site of Icho Tower.
L'Avarison				Site of Seymour Tower.
Île Mâitre				
Marmotier				
La Sambue				
Long Echet				

== Islands in Chausey ==
The archipelago of Chausey comprises 365 islands at low tide, compared to only 52 islands at high tide.

Name	Image	Coordinates	Area (hectares)
Grande-Île			45
La Genétaie			1.82
La Meule			1.38
La Houllée			0.86
L'îles aux Oiseaux			0.62
Grand Épail			0.29
