= UTC+01:00 =

Identifier for a time offset

- Time zone
- World map with the time zone highlighted

UTC offset
- UTC: UTC+01:00

Current time
- 08:37, 20 September 2026 UTC+01:00 [refresh]

Central meridian
- 15 degrees E

Date-time group
- A

Time in Europe: Light Blue / Western European Time / Greenwich Mean Time (UTC); Blue / Western European Time / Greenwich Mean Time (UTC); Blue / Western European Summer Time / British Summer Time / Irish Standard Time (UTC+1); Red / Central European Time (UTC+1); Red / Central European Summer Time (UTC+2); Yellow / Eastern European Time / Kaliningrad Time (UTC+2); Ochre / Eastern European Time (UTC+2); Ochre / Eastern European Summer Time (UTC+3); Green / Moscow Time / Turkey Time (UTC+3); Turquoise / Armenia Time / Azerbaijan Time / Georgia Time / Samara Time (UTC+4); ▉▉▉▉ Pale hues: Standard time observed all year ▉▉▉ Dark hues: Daylight saving time

Time in Africa: Light Blue / Cape Verde Time^{[a]} (UTC−1); Blue / Greenwich Mean Time (UTC); Red / Central European Time; West Africa Time; (UTC+1)^{[b]}; Yellow / Central Africa Time; Eastern European Time; South African Standard Time; (UTC+2); Ochre / Egypt Standard Time (UTC+2); Ochre / Egypt Summer Time (UTC+3); Green / East Africa Time (UTC+3); Turquoise / Mauritius Time^{[d]}; Seychelles Time^{[d]}; (UTC+4)^{a} The islands of Cape Verde are west of the African mainland.^{b} In September 2026, Morocco will switch permanently to Greenwich Mean Time.^{d} Mauritius and the Seychelles are east and northeast of Madagascar, respectively.

UTC+01:00 is an identifier for a time offset from UTC of +01:00. In ISO 8601, the associated time would be written as 2019-02-07T23:28:34+01:00. It indicates a point of time meaning Greenwich Mean Time (GMT) plus one hour. It is synonymous with Central European Time (CET).

This time is used in:

- Central European Time
- West Africa Time
- Western European Summer Time
  - British Summer Time
  - Irish Standard Time

== Central European Time (Northern Hemisphere winter) ==
Principal cities: Berlin, Budapest, Frankfurt, Munich, Hamburg, Cologne, Düsseldorf, Stuttgart, Leipzig, Dortmund, Essen, Bremen, Hanover, Mainz, Rome, Milan, Naples, Venice, Florence, Palermo, Turin, Genoa, Vatican City, San Marino, Paris, Marseille, Bordeaux, Nantes, Lyon, Lille, Montpellier, Toulouse, Strasbourg, Nice, Monaco, Madrid, Barcelona, Valencia, Seville, Málaga, Bilbao, A Coruña, Granada, Andorra, Vienna, Salzburg, Innsbruck, Zürich, Geneva, Bern, Bellinzona, Lausanne, Lucerne, St. Gallen, Brussels, Antwerp, Amsterdam, Rotterdam, Luxembourg, Valletta, Copenhagen, Stockholm, Oslo, Warsaw, Prague, Zagreb, Tirana, Sarajevo, Pristina, Podgorica, Skopje, Belgrade, Bratislava, Ljubljana, Vaduz, Schaan, Serravalle, Dogana, Monte Carlo, Monaco-Ville, Monaco, Westside, St. Paul's Bay, Malmö.

=== Europe ===
==== Central Europe ====
- Albania
- Andorra
- Austria
- Belgium
- Bosnia and Herzegovina
- Croatia
- Czech Republic
- Denmark
- France (Metropolitan)
- Germany
- Hungary
- Italy
- Kosovo
- Liechtenstein
- Luxembourg
- Malta
- Monaco
- Montenegro
- Netherlands
- North Macedonia
- Norway
  - Svalbard (including Bear Island)
  - Jan Mayen
- Poland
- San Marino
- Serbia
- Slovakia
- Slovenia
- Spain (continental territory including Balearic Islands, Ceuta and Melilla, and excluding Canary Islands, which observe UTC+1 during summer)
- Sweden
- Switzerland
- United Kingdom
  - Gibraltar
- Vatican City

=== Antarctica ===
- Norway
  - Bouvet Island (Note: Despite being on the Southern Hemisphere, Bouvet Island uses Northern Hemisphere daylight saving time.)
  - Queen Maud Land

== Western European Summer Time (Northern Hemisphere summer) ==
Principal cities: London, Birmingham, Manchester, Edinburgh, Liverpool, Bristol, Belfast, Glasgow, Cardiff, Dublin, Cork, Limerick, Las Palmas de Gran Canaria, Santa Cruz de Tenerife, Lisbon, Porto, Braga, Tórshavn

=== Europe ===
==== Western Europe ====
- Denmark
  - Faroe Islands
- Ireland
- Portugal (Including Madeira and excluding Azores islands)
- United Kingdom (Great Britain) – (GMT / BST) (Including Guernsey, Isle of Man and Jersey)
  - England
  - Scotland
    - Northern Isles
      - Orkney
      - Shetland
    - Western Isles
  - Northern Ireland
  - Wales
    - Anglesey
- Channel Islands (Crown Dependencies)
  - Alderney
  - Sark
  - Herm
  - Isle of Wight
  - Normandy
- Some small islands Channel Islands or Crown Dependencies
  - Brecqhou
  - Jethou
  - Lihou
  - Écréhous
  - Minquiers
  - Les Dirouilles
  - Pierres de Lecq
  - Casquets
  - Renonquet
  - Caquorobert
  - Crevichon
  - Grande Amfroque
  - Les Houmets

==== Atlantic Ocean ====
- Portugal
  - Madeira
- Spain
  - Canary Islands (the rest of Spain observes UTC+1 during winter)

== As standard time (year-round) ==
Principal cities: Lagos, Abuja, Kinshasa, Algiers, Tunis, Yaoundé, Douala, Malabo, Bata, Libreville, Niamey, N'Djamena, Bangui, Porto-Novo, Cotonou, Luanda

=== Africa ===
==== West Africa ====
- Algeria
- Angola
- Benin
- Cameroon
- Central African Republic
- Chad
- Democratic Republic of the Congo:
  - The provinces of Bandundu, Équateur, Kinshasa, Kongo Central, Kwango, Kwilu, Mai-Ndombe, Mongala, Nord-Ubangi, Sud-Ubangi and Tshuapa
- Republic of the Congo
- Equatorial Guinea
- Gabon
- Niger
- Nigeria
- Tunisia

== Discrepancies between official UTC+01:00 and geographical UTC+01:00 ==
=== Areas in UTC+01:00 longitudes using UTC+02:00 ===
From south to north:

- South Africa
  - The westernmost part, including Cape Town
- Botswana
  - The western part of the districts:
    - Kgalagadi
    - Ghanzi
    - Ngamiland
- Democratic Republic of the Congo
  - The very westernmost part of Lualaba Province, Kasaï-Central and Sankuru
- Libya
  - The most part in the country, including nation's capital Tripoli
- Greece (standard time)
  - The western part, including Patras and Ioanina
- Romania (standard time)
  - The westernmost part, including Timișoara
- Russia
  - Kaliningrad Oblast
- Lithuania (standard time)
  - The westernmost part, including Klaipėda
- Latvia (standard time)
  - The westernmost part, including Liepāja
- Estonia (standard time)
  - The westernmost parts of the Saare and Hiiu counties
- Finland (standard time)
  - The westernmost part, including Turku

=== Areas outside UTC+01:00 longitudes using UTC+01:00 time ===
==== Areas between meridians 7°30'W and 7°30'E ("physical" UTC+00:00) ====
All of:

- Andorra
- Belgium
- Gibraltar
- Luxembourg
- Monaco
- Netherlands
- Benin

Most of:

- Spain, excluding Canary Islands (which use UTC) and westernmost part of the mainland (see below)
- France (with exception of small parts of Alsace, Lorraine and Provence are east of 7°30'E)
- Algeria, including Algiers

Parts of:

- Equatorial Guinea (Annobón Island only)
- Niger (western part)
- Nigeria (western part)
- Germany (The very westernmost part)
- Switzerland (westernmost part)
- Italy (The very northwesternmost part)
- Norway (Bouvet Island and southwesternmost part)

==== Areas between meridians 22°30'W and 7°30'W ("physical" UTC−01:00) ====
- Spain
  - Parts of Galicia, Extremadura and Andalusia
- Norway
  - Jan Mayen
