= Guernsey Fire and Rescue Service =

Operational area
- Country: Guernsey
- Address: Arsenal Road, GY1 1UW

Agency overview
- Established: 1922
- Annual calls: 891 (2015)
- Employees: 58 whole time & 10 part time (2017)
- Chief Fire Officer: Les Britzman

Facilities and equipment
- Stations: 2

Website
- www.gov.gg/fire

The Guernsey Fire and Rescue Service is the statutory fire and rescue service which deals with a broad range of incidents on Guernsey, including fires, road traffic accidents, assisting property owner after storm damage or flooding and incidents involving hazardous substances.

== History ==
The earliest records show new fire engines delivered from London in 1768. The engine, probably a hand drawn pump, being kept inside the Town Church, Guernsey, being relocated in 1823 to the Glategny Esplanade in Saint Peter Port. It was not until 1873 that a horse drawn manual pump was acquired for use by trained firefighters employed by an insurance company, the "Mutual", housed at Tower Hill, Saint Peter Port.

In 1884, the Parish of Saint Peter Port bought the Mutual engine and assumed responsibility and based the engine with a hand cart and ladders at the Town Hospital. Hand pumps were later based at Saint Peter Port Harbour and St Sampson's Harbour.

1909 saw the acquisition of a motorised fire engine, a Merryweather pump on an Aster chassis, it was named Sarnia and a purpose-built fire station was built in Upland Road. In 1922, the cost was taken over by the States of Guernsey and in 1935, a 1931 Albion Merryweather escape carrier was bought and named Sarmia II. The equipment was relocated in 1935 to the Town Arsenal, buildings previously used by the Royal Guernsey Militia. Sarnia II has been preserved and is kept at the Guernsey Occupation Museum.

In 1939, Guernsey Airport was opened and a Morris Commercial fire truck was supplied, to be operated by airport staff if the need arose. Four Austin trucks were also acquired just in time for the bombing of Guernsey and the German occupation of the Channel Islands during which time a German officer commanded the fire brigade.

It was in 2005 that the Fire Brigade name was changed to the current Guernsey Fire and Rescue Service. The service is regulated by, obtain powers from and have duties set out in The Fire Services (Guernsey) Law, 1989 as amended.

== Herm ==
The service maintains some equipment and a team of retained firefighters on the island of Herm.

== Airport ==
There are 36 trained fire fighters working at Guernsey Airport, forming the Airport Fire Service.

== Fire stations ==
The service's two stations are Guernsey, which is crewed by both wholetime firefighters and retained firefighters; and Herm which is crewed by retained firefighters.

== Emergency services on Guernsey ==
- Guernsey Ambulance and Rescue Service
- States of Guernsey Police Service
- Saint Peter Port Lifeboat Station
