= Guernsey Police =

- Guernsey Police Logo

Agency overview
- Formed: 10 April 1920
- Employees: 245

Jurisdictional structure
- National agency (Operations jurisdiction): Bailiwick of Guernsey
- Operations jurisdiction: Bailiwick of Guernsey
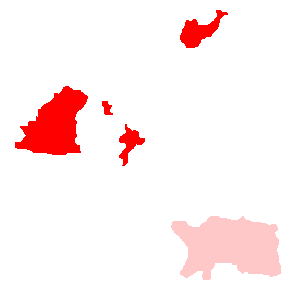
- Map of Guernsey Police's jurisdiction
- Area: 78 km²
- Population: Approx 67,000
- Legal jurisdiction: Guernsey, Alderney, Sark and Herm (Bailiwick of Guernsey)
- Governing body: States of Guernsey
- General nature: Civilian police

Operational structure
- Headquarters: Hospital Lane, St Peter Port
- Sworn members: Approx 150
- Agency executive: Damian Kitchen, Chief Officer
- Parent agency: Committee for Home Affairs

Facilities
- Stations: 2

Website
- www.guernsey.police.uk

The Guernsey Police, is the police service for the Bailiwick of Guernsey, a jurisdictional sub-group of Crown Dependencies within the Channel Islands.

The service's enforcement jurisdiction extends across the entire bailiwick and encompasses the Islands of Guernsey, Alderney, Herm, and Sark. The Guernsey Police falls under the government department of Home Affairs, States of Guernsey.

== History ==
In common with many communities, a historical development of parish constables formed the system of law enforcement for many centuries. In the 19th century, the people of Guernsey complained that this system was inadequate for a growing population, and a professional police force was demanded. The parish constables retained their historic role, but from 1853 uniformed assistant constables were appointed. Initially, there were four of them, with a uniform hat and belt worn over their civilian clothing. They provided full-time policing, under the authority of the elected parish constables.

The current police force was formed following approval by the States of Deliberation in March 1915, consisting of an inspector, two sergeants, two corporals and eleven constables, with the force being formally founded on 10 April 1920. During the five-year German occupation of the Channel Islands the police had a difficult time whilst working alongside the German military police and the Feldgendarmerie (field police). In 1945 the force resumed its normal role and is now considerably expanded, as of 2018 it had 151 officers. These are supported by 94 civilian staff, who work in roles where warranted officers are not required.

From March 2015, emergency calls for all emergency services in Guernsey have been routed through the Joint Emergency Services Control Centre (JESCC), linking police, fire, ambulance and coastguard services.

In late January 2019, Guernsey Police led the investigation into the high-profile disappearance of Argentinian footballer Emiliano Sala, whose aircraft had last made radar contact near Alderney.

On 10 April 2020, the Guernsey Police celebrated its 100th anniversary, with a planned set of events to commemorate this event. These events were postponed in light of the COVID-19 pandemic which resulted in a lockdown of the island as positive cases were confirmed in the island.

== Structure and ranks ==
The force is headed by a chief officer (CO), with two deputy chief officer's (DCO) as a joint second in command. The current Chief Officer of Guernsey Police is Damian Kitchen, after the former CO Ruari Hardy stepped down from the role in October 2024. As of 2025, the current (and only) DCO is Richard Bell, following the retirement of former DCO Phillip Breban in July 2025. The next highest ranked officer after the CO and DCO is Superintendent Liam Johnson. Each of the four branches within the Guernsey Police is headed by a chief inspector; the branches are uniformed operations, crime services, operations and specialist services. Significant units within these four divisions include the commercial fraud department, the economic crime division, the explosive ordnance disposal unit and the police dog section.

States of Guernsey Police Service ranks and insignia
Rank	Chief officer	Deputy chief officer	Superintendent	Chief inspector	Inspector	Sergeant	Constable
Epaulette insignia							

== Joint Emergency Services Control Centre (JESCC) ==
In 2015, Guernsey Police's control room was combined into one central location for the Islands of Guernsey, Alderney, Herm, and Sark. Operators in the room use a bespoke computer-aided dispatch software to manage, Police, Guernsey Ambulance and Rescue Service, Guernsey Fire and Rescue Service and 999 (emergency telephone number) Calls. All three emergency services were merged into one area and all operators are trained to deal with emergency and non-emergency calls, similar to the Police 101 and the NHS 111 services. JESCC does not offer on the phone medical advice like the 111 service but triages calls through a standardised set of questions as part of their computer-aided dispatch system.

Guernsey Coastguard is based at St Peter Port Harbour and maintains 24/7 watch on Channel 16 VHF and its local frequency, VHF channel 20. It also broadcasts marine Navigation Warnings for the terrestrial waters within the Bailiwick of Guernsey.

JESCC staff are all trained in emergency call handling and the dispatch of all services, however, are civilians and not sworn in police officers

== Special Constables ==
Guernsey Police has a system of special constables, with three distinct types of volunteer officer, known as 'A', 'B', or 'C' division of the special constabulary.

=== ‘A’ Division ===
'A' division special constables are full-time employees of third party agencies who are granted limited police powers within their workplace, to provide a first response whilst professional police officers are travelling to an incident; for example, a number of hospital porters are sworn as 'A' division special constables to provide an enhanced level of hospital security.

=== ‘B’Division ===
'B' division special constables are fully trained to support their full-time colleagues in all aspects of policing. They are commonly deployed in tandem with professional colleagues at large scale public events, and during weekend periods.

=== ‘C’ Division ===
'C' division special constables carry out the duties of a traffic warden, but have certain police powers in respect of traffic control, for example around school areas at peak times.

== Awards ==
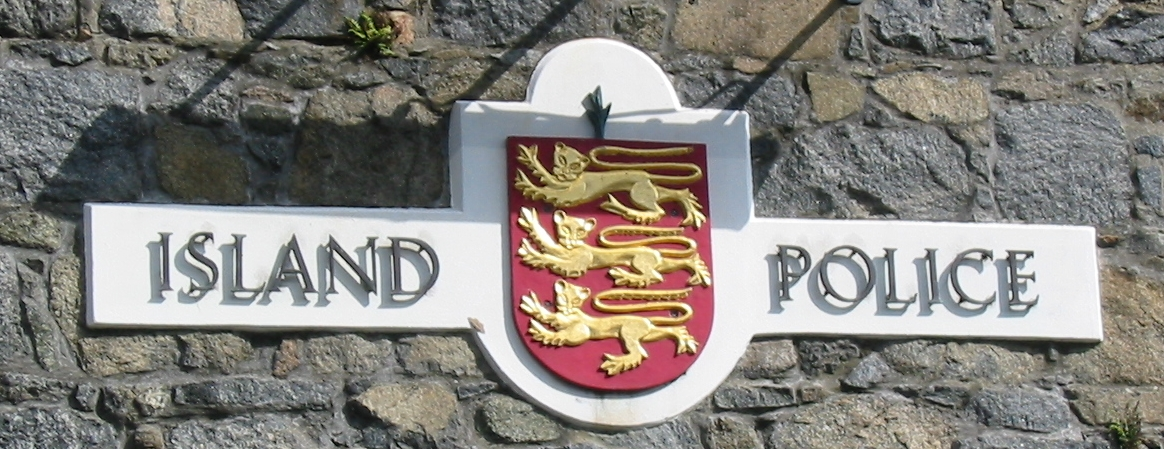
Sign at police headquarters, St. Peter Port

- On 12 January 1940 Sergeant Charles Le Lievre was awarded the King's Police Medal for gallantry in relation to an assault on 9 June 1939.
- On 11 December 1945, Mr A Lamy was awarded the British Empire Medal for services rendered during the Occupation.
- On 1 January 1957 the Queen's Police Medal was awarded to the Chief Officer Mr A Lamy.
- The British Empire Medal was awarded to Sergeant Noel Trotter in connection with the rescue of a boy who fell over a cliff on 4 August 1956.
