= Houmets =

Islands east of Guernsey in the Channel Islands

Coordinates: 49°29′43″N 2°29′55″W

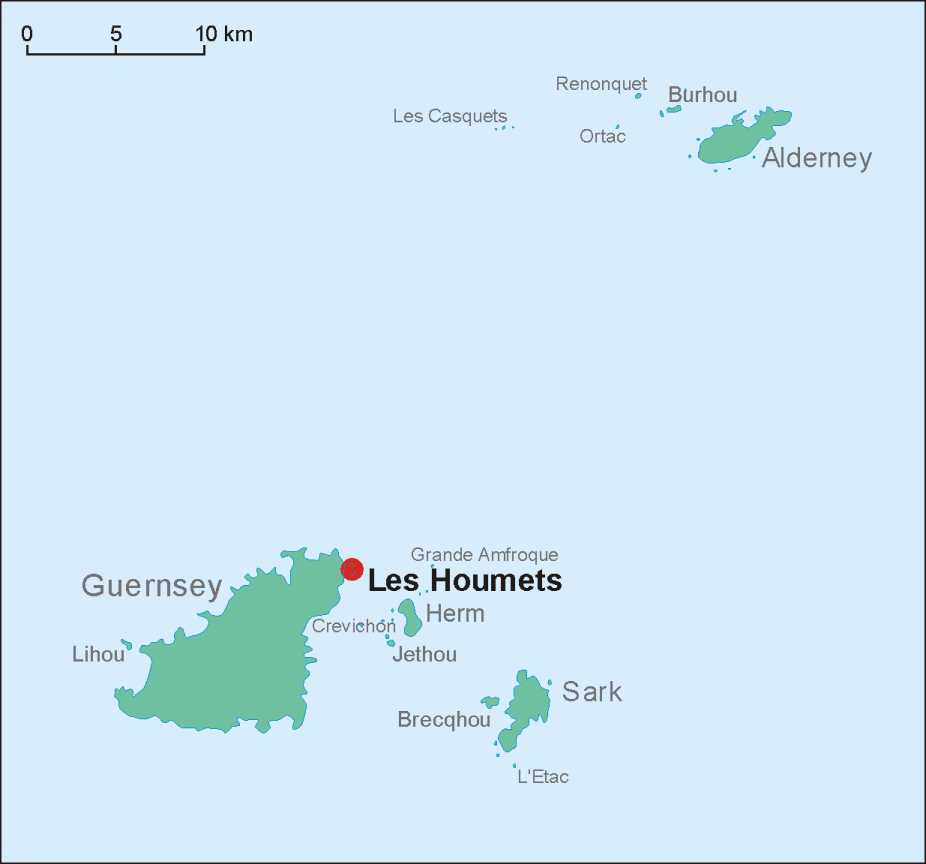
Location map of Les Houmets

Les Houmets are tidal islands to the east of Guernsey in the Channel Islands. Their name derives from a diminutive of hou, a Norman/Guernésiais word meaning islets.

Among the islets are Houmet Benest/Houmet Benêt, Houmet Paradis and Houmet Hommetol (Omptolle). Although Victor Hugo suggests that they were heavily eroded by quarrying (which was certainly true in the case of Crevichon off Herm), Victor Coysh disagrees saying:

"While much work of this nature was in progress in the parishes of the Vale and St. Sampson in the last century [i.e. 19th], quarrying was not responsible for any marked alteration in the coast off which Les Houmets lie. In fact, they have been islets for a very long time, as ancient maps reveal. Did the author ever visit them, I wonder."

== Victor Hugo ==
Victor Hugo who wrote about many of the Channel Islands in his books, described Les Houmets, in his work The Toilers of the Sea (Les Travailleurs de la mer). Gilliat, the main character lives on Houmet Paradis:

"This house was called the Bû de la Rue. It was situated on the point of a tongue of land, or rather of rock, that made a little separate harbour in the creek of Houmet Paradis. The water was very deep here. This house was all alone on the point, almost off the land, with just enough land for a small garden. The high tides sometimes inundated the garden. Between the port of St. Sampson and the creek of Houmet Paradis rises a steep hill, surmounted by the block of towers covered with ivy, and known as Vale Castle, or the Château de l’Archange; so that, at St. Sampson, the Bû de la Rue was shut out from sight..."

Moreover, this house had some very nasty inhabitants besides Gilliat,

"The country people told how, towards the close of the great Revolution, a woman, bringing with her a little child, came to live in Guernsey. She was an Englishwoman; at least, she was not French. She had a name which the Guernsey pronunciation and the country folks’ bad spelling had finally converted into 'Gilliatt.'...the house of the Bû de la Rue was haunted at this period. For more than thirty years no one had inhabited it. It was falling into ruins. The garden, so often invaded by the sea, could produce nothing. Besides noises and lights seen there at night-time, the house had this mysterious peculiarity: any one who should leave there in the evening, upon the mantelpiece, a ball of worsted, a few needles, and a plate filled with soup, would assuredly find in the morning the soup consumed, the plate empty, and a pair of mittens ready knitted. The house, demon included, was offered for sale for a few pounds sterling. The stranger woman became the purchaser, evidently tempted by the devil, or by the advantageous bargain.

"She did more than purchase the house; she took up her abode there with the child; and from that moment peace reigned within its walls. The Bû de la Rue has found a fit tenant, said the country people. The haunting ceased. There was no longer any light seen there save that of the tallow candle of the newcomer. 'Witch’s candle is as good as devil’s torch.' The proverb satisfied the gossips of the neighbourhood...

"Today it would be useless to look for the cove of Houmet Paradis, for Gilliat's house and for the creek where he sheltered the boat. The Bû de la Rue no longer exists. The little peninsula where this house stood has fallen under the pick-axe of the destroyers of the sea-cliffs and has been loaded, cart-load, by cart-load, on the vessels belonging to the dealers in rocks and granite... All this ridge of rock has been long ago taken to London."

The novel was written in the 1860s and set in the 1820s when the islands were still inhabited.

== The islets ==
Houmet Benest/Benêt is about two hundred yards (180 m) from the shore, preceded by a small rock called "Hommet" from the same root. It is triangular, and 80 × 50 yards (73 × 45 m). There is an 18th-century gun battery here, to defend against the French. The German occupation added their own, and the British another after the Germans left. The steamer Clarrie sank off Houmet Benêt in 1921, in the Great Roussel. Heathery Brae in 1952 tried to salvage it, but ended up being wrecked itself, and there are also the wrecks of Vixen (a brig), Rescue (a tug) and Romp (a cutter) went ashore here. It is covered in grass and brambles.

Houmet Paradis, the fictional Gilliat's home, was originally known as Houmet de l'Eperquerie, as it was used for fish gutting, and drying on stands known as perques (perches). It was formerly owned by the Collas family, whose estate at Paradis, gave the islet its new name. In the 1920s, it was used for quarrying, and it was also used for grazing cattle, and has a lot of grass. In 1951 it was sold to James Watson of Newcastle upon Tyne for the sum of £500 who placed the island under the stewardship of the National Trust of Guernsey. It remained within the family until 2004 when it was sold at auction by James Watson's grandson (also called James Watson) to a local consortium with the intention of maintaining the island as a nature reserve.

Hommetol, more commonly called Omptolle by the Ordnance Survey etc., is used for gathering ormer. It is mostly covered in thrift.
