= Operation Huckaback =

WW2 British Commando raid

Operation Huckaback was a British Commando raid during the Second World War. The raid was carried out by No. 62 Commando also known as the Small Scale Raiding Force (SSRF) over the night of 27/28 February 1943.

The raid was originally planned for the night of 9/10 February 1943, as simultaneous raids on Herm, Jethou and Brecqhou. The objective was to take prisoners and gain information about the situation in the occupied Channel Islands. It was to be carried out by 42 men from the SSRF and No. 4 Commando, but was cancelled because of bad weather.

Huckaback was reinvented as a raid on Herm alone on the night of 27/28 February 1943. Ten men of the SSRF under Captain Patrick Anthony Porteous VC landed 200 yards (180 m) to the north-west of Selle Rocque on a shingle beach from MTB 344. After three unsuccessful attempts to scale the cliff, Porteous finally managed to climb up the bed of a stream and pulled the others up using toggle ropes.

On reaching Belvoir House, they found it had been broken into and abandoned. Further reconnaissance found that the Old Tower of Herm and the Château were also deserted. The raid did not find any signs of the German occupation troop or the island's population. The caretaker of Belvoir house was aware of strangers on the island, but locked his door. Leaflets were left for the Germans to find. The commandos departed and returned to England.

The few civilians on the island were living near the harbour and were not aware of the raid taking place at the time.
