= Little Roussel =

Coordinates: 49.48°N 2.48°W

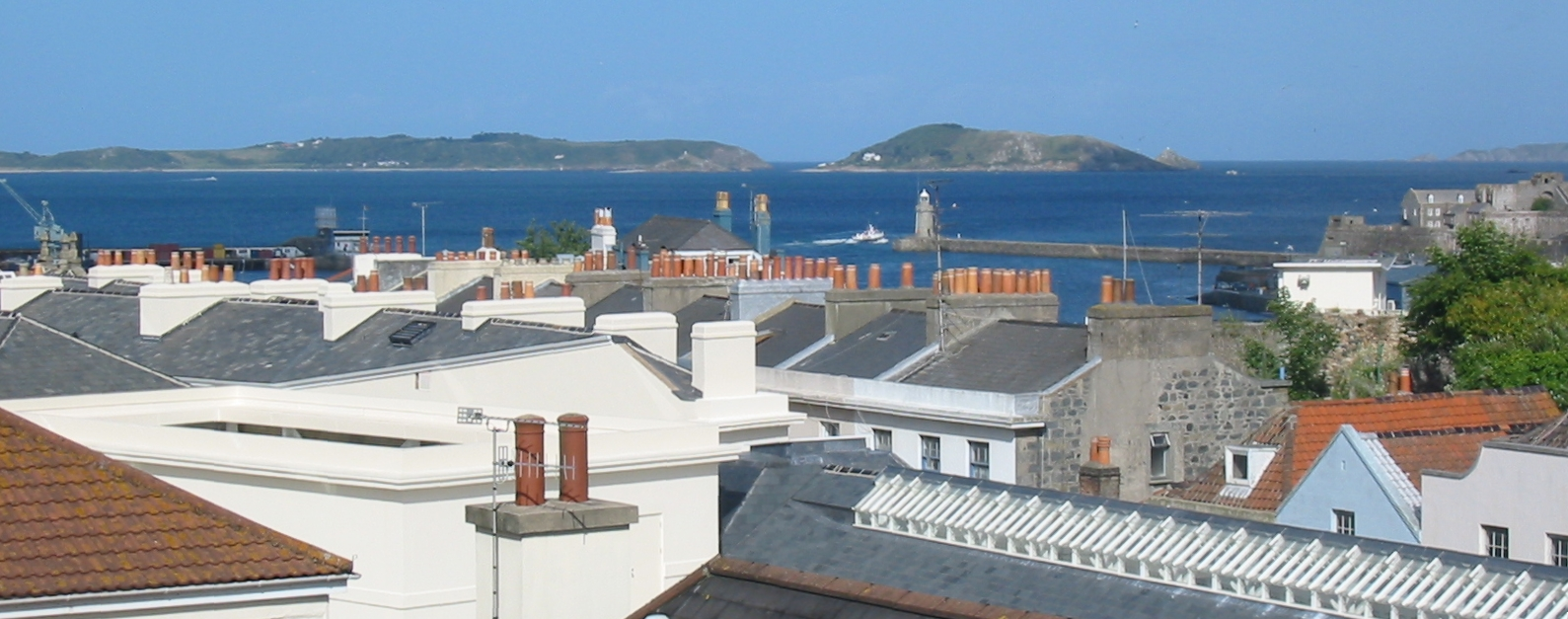
A view from the rooftops of St Peter Port across the Little Russel to Herm and Jethou

The Little Roussel, also known as the Petit Ruau or Little Russel, is a channel running between the isle of Herm and Guernsey in the Channel Islands.

The main harbours of Guernsey and Herm face into the Little Roussel. There are many small rocks in the channel, including Hermetier, Castle Cornet (now joined to the mainland) and others. The Bréhon Tower (Fort Bréhon) is accessible only by boat and sits on Bréhon, an island in the Little Roussel about 1.5 km northeast of St Peter Port, Guernsey, between the port and Herm.

The Herm ferry, from St Peter Port Harbour runs across the Little Roussel.

The Big Roussel (also called Great Roussel, Big Russel, or Grand Ruau), is the channel running between Herm on the west, and Brecqhou, and Sark on the east.
