= St Tugual's Chapel =

Chapel on Herm, Channel Islands

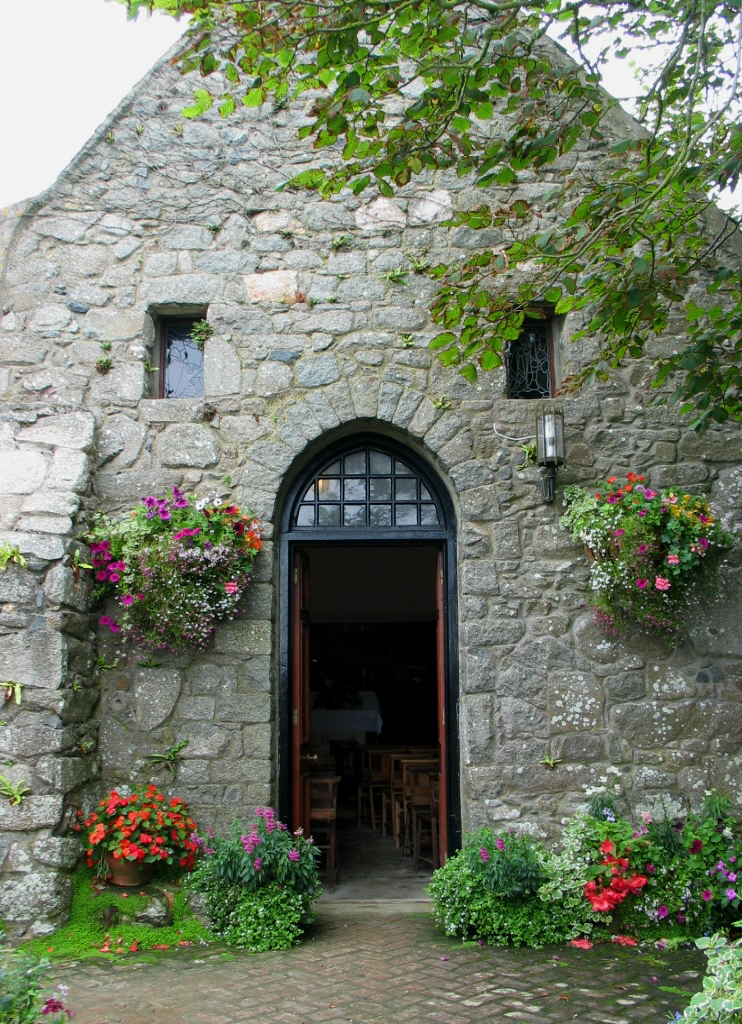
- The entrance to St Tugual's Chapel

Religion
- Region: None

Location
- State: States of Guernsey
- Interactive map of St Tugual's Chapel
- Coordinates: 49.4717°N 2.4492°W

St Tugual's Chapel is a non-denominational and non-consecrated chapel which dates from the 11th century. It is located on Herm, the smallest of the Channel Islands open to the public. The chapel is currently listed on the Register of Ancient Monuments and Protected Buildings for the States of Guernsey.

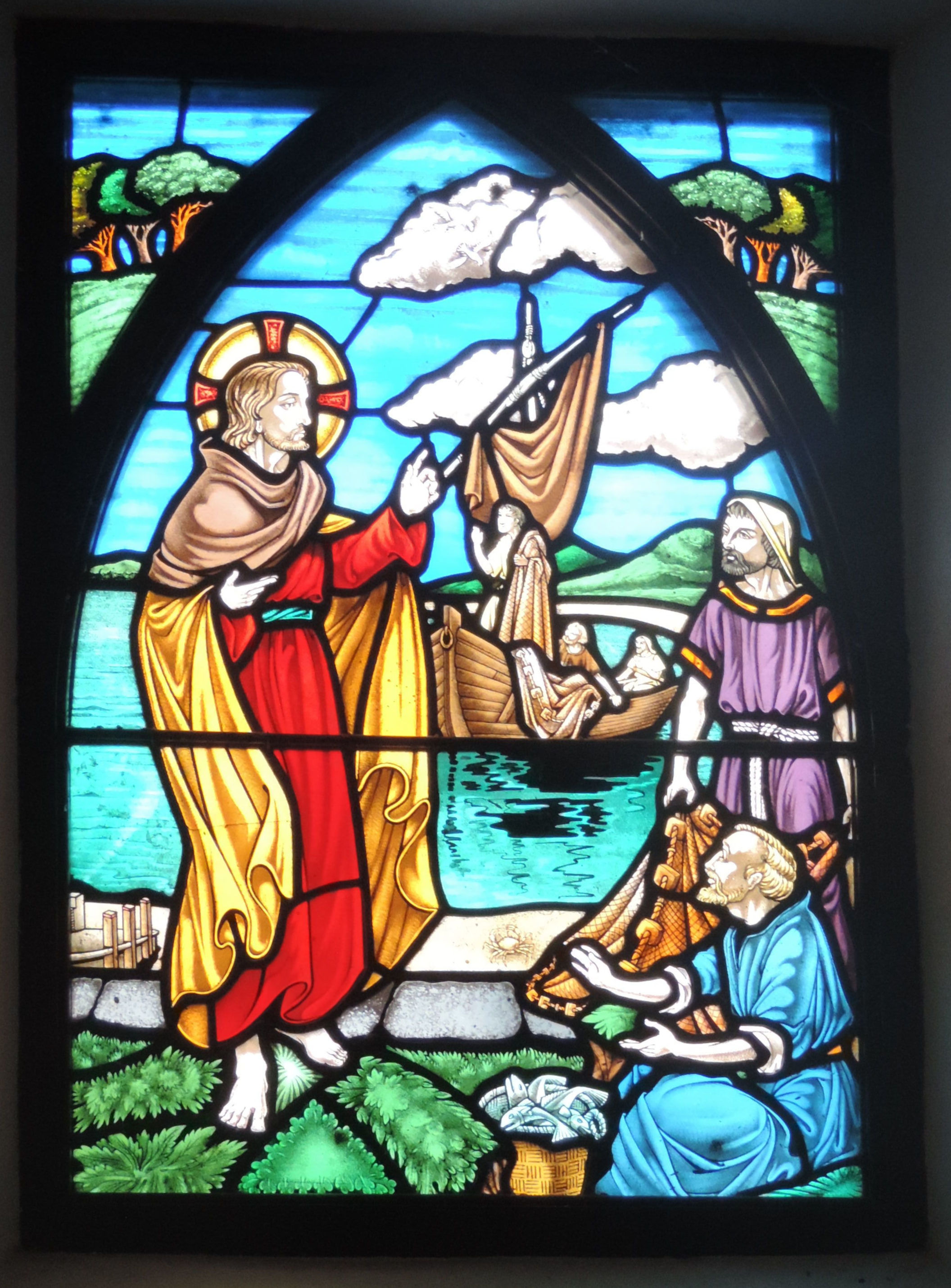
Stained-glass window in St. Tugual's Chapel

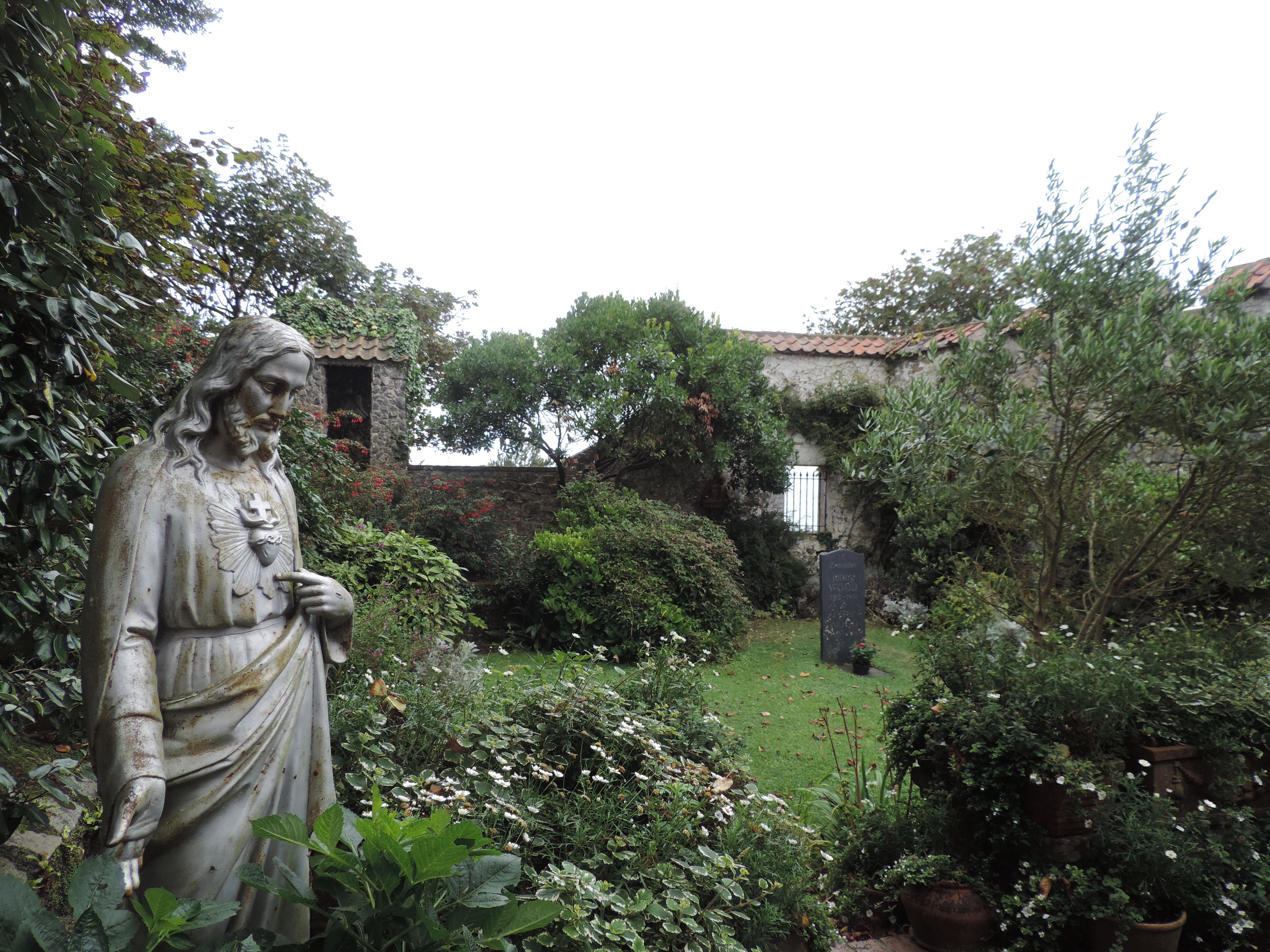
Small graveyard attached to St. Tugual's Chapel

== History ==
The chapel, which incorporates an earlier structure, dates from the 11th century; but it has been suggested that the site has been of religious significance from the 6th century. It is uncertain if the chapel was named after Saint Tugual because he visited Herm; or if it was so called by Tugual's followers.

The current chapel was built by Norman monks who lived on the island.

When the Wood family took over the island's lease in 1949, they re-opened parts of the chapel; and cleared several windows.

The Chapel featured on a 1970 stamp.

=== Restoration work ===
In 2010 and 2011, the chapel was closed for restoration work, in which there was re-roofing, repointing, re-rendering, and drainage installation. The States of Guernsey are responsible for the chapel's upkeep. The chapel re-opened with a special re-dedication service in May 2011.

=== Skeletons ===
During the works; two skeletons were found; that of an adult and that of a child. The skeletons were originally estimated to be between 400 and 500 years old. Soon, three more part skeletons were expected to be excavated; but eventually, within a 15m sq area; 40 skeletons were found, around 50% of which were children. The skeletons were taken to Guernsey by a team led by Philip de Jersey, then were returned to Herm for burial. The earliest bones dated were from the second half of the 10th century.
