= Travel Trident =

Shipping company based in Guernsey

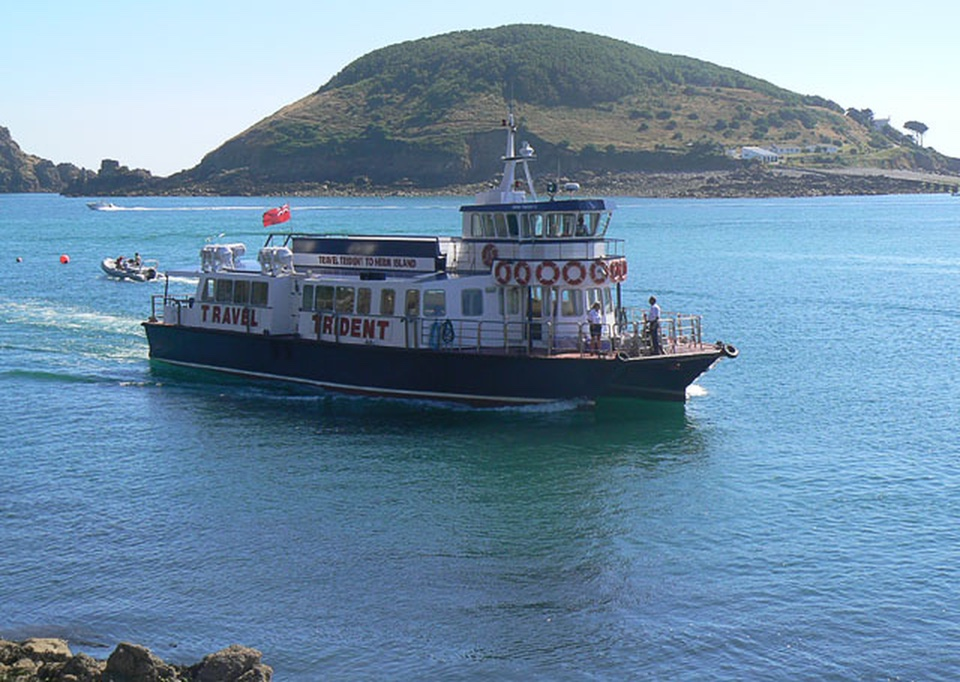
- Trident V approaching Rosaire Steps, Herm
- Type: Limited
- Founded: 1968
- Headquarters: St Peter Port, Guernsey
- Area served: Channel Islands
- Key people: Peter Wilcox (Managing Director)
- Services: Passenger transportation
- Website: traveltrident.com

The Trident Charter Company Limited, trading as Travel Trident and commonly known as Trident, is a shipping company based in St Peter Port, Guernsey that operates small passenger ferries between Guernsey and the island of Herm.

== History ==
The Trident Charter Company Limited was founded in 1968 and began operations the following summer between Guernsey and Herm in 1969.

In 2021, the island of Herm purchased two of its own ferries, the newly-built Isle of Herm, and later the Brecqhou Lass, renaming the vessel to the Herm Lass. Trident's manager and director, Peter Wilcox, accused the management of Herm of becoming "commercially aggressive," which led to the cancellation of winter sailings operated by Trident.

On 14 June 2023, the service operated by Herm ended. Trident agreed to sign a five-year deal with Herm to run a year-round service, which would see the return of winter sailings, with more than previosuly offered.

In December 2025, Trident expressed interest in operating services to Sark. Currently, ferries to Sark are operated by the Isle of Sark Shipping Company, which at the time had been criticised for scaling back its winter timetable due to financial pressures.

== Fleet ==
Ship	Vessel type	Built	Entered service	References
Trident V	Catamaran	1989	1989	
Trident VI	Catamaran	1991	1991	

== Accidents and incidents ==
=== Norman Commodore collision with the Trident VI ===
In 1994, the Herm Trident VI was at anchor when it was rammed and effectively demolished by the Norman Commodore when she lost engine control. The Trident VI was rebuilt and re-entered service in 1995.

=== Trident VI grounding ===
On 23 August 2003, in poor visibility, the Herm Trident VI ran aground on Percée Rocks near Herm Island. The vessel remained afloat, and the 179 passengers were safely evacuated onto the Herm Trident V. The ferry then made its way to St Peter Port under its own steam.

=== 2016 Trident V groundings ===
In 2016, the Trident V ran aground on two separate occasions.

The first occurred on 22 April 2016, when the vessel, with three crew and 35 passengers, struck a reef in the Alligande Passage (the most direct route between St Peter Port Harbour and Herm Harbour) at low tide whilst sailing from Guernsey. No one was injured, but the impact damaged the propeller and starboard shaft. It was found that the crew failed to declare an emergency via radio, instead using a mobile phone to summon assistance from the Trident VI and a harbour workboat, delaying a potential coordinated response. Passengers received a brief announcement, but no formal evacuation procedures were followed, and the vessel returned to port for repairs.

The second incident took place on 8 June 2016. This time carrying 19 passengers and three crew, the Trident V ran aground in the Alligande Passage for the second time due to navigational deviation in fog. Travelling at 12.5 knots, the vessel stopped abruptly with a loud impact, causing it to swing. Passengers were evacuated onto the St Peter Port lifeboat, while the damaged vessel was towed back by the workboat Sarnia. There were no injuries. Damage included distortion to the skeg, rudder, propeller, and hull plating, leading to suspension of the safety certificate and the master's license for three months. The Bailiwick of Guernsey Marine Administration report cited complacency from repetitive voyages, inadequate passage planning for low tide and visibility, and unadjusted radar settings as key factors.

Both of these incidents saw immediate action from Trident, including improved training and procedural updates, though the investigations did highlight ongoing risks from non-adherence to emergency protocols.
