= White House, Herm =

Historic hotel in Herm

White House
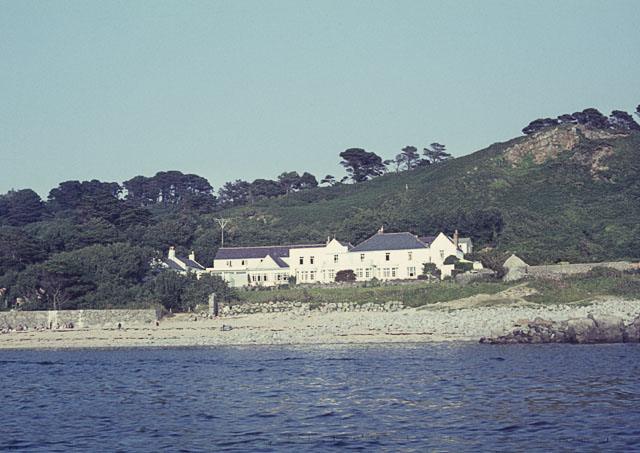

- Location in the Channel Islands

General information
- Location: Herm
- Coordinates: 49°28′7″N 2°27′12″W

White House is a historic hotel in Herm, in the Channel Islands. Converted into a hotel from an old country house in 1949, the hotel contains 36 double rooms, 2 single rooms, 1 suite, and 21 rooms in 3 cottage annexes.

Fiona Duncan of The Daily Telegraph described the hotel as "one in which she wanted to buy", "a much-extended inn that makes a perfect hotel, with a pretty central staircase and light, spacious, public rooms with open fires leading to a cosy bar, a conservatory and a beautifully sited, palm-fringed outdoor swimming pool that could, if the poolside furniture were changed, be on the Amalfi Coast." It contains the terraced Ship Inn restaurant.
