= Herm Island F.C. =

Football club based in Herm, Guernsey

Herm Island
- Full name: Herm Island football club
- Nickname: The Bels
- Founded: 2010
- Ground: Cambridge Park
- Manager: Aaron Moore
Home colours

Herm Island F.C. is an amateur association football club based on the Isle of Herm in the Channel Islands. Nicknamed the Bels, they currently compete in the Railway League, the third tier of the Guernsey FA Football League.

== History ==
Herm Island F.C. was founded in 2010 by island residents and seasonal staff wanting to bring organised football to Herm. They are sponsored by SK Kits, who also provide their kits. The club made their debut in the Guernsey FA’s Railway League in the same year and has competed in the Railway League ever since. During the 2014–15 season on the 1 September 2014, the club won by securing a 1–0 away victory against Rangers, putting them third in the league. They did not score any other points throughout the rest of the season, finishing with only 3 points at the bottom of the league. The club's other side, however, ended up winning the league title with 34 points.

The club has also participated in the Guernsey FA Cup, starting in the 2016–17 season. Herm defeated Centrals 6–5 in Round 1 but lost 0–5 to Geomarine Rovers in Round 2.

== Ground ==
Herm Island F.C. is unable to host matches on Herm as much of the land is protected, and cannot be used as a football pitch. The club therefore plays its home fixtures at Northfield, Grand Fort Road in St. Sampson, Guernsey.

== Match history ==
=== 2014–15 season ===
| 1 September 2014 Railway League | Rangers Railway 1 | 0–1 | Herm Island FC | St Andrew's |
| 18:00 BST | | Report |

| 8 September 2014 Railway League | Manor Farm Saints | 8–0 | Herm Island FC | Blanche Pierre Lane |
| 19:00 BST | | Report |

| 16 September 2014 Railway League | Herm Island FC | 2–4 | United FC | Northfield |
| 19:00 BST | | Report |

| 22 September 2014 Railway League | Herm Island FC | 2–3 | Rovers AC 3 | Northfield |
| 19:00 BST | | Report |

| 29 September 2014 Railway League | Northerners | 10–0 | Herm Island FC | Northfield |
| 19:00 BST | | Report |

| 3 March 2015 Railway League | Herm Island FC | 1–3 | Manor Farm Saints | Northfield |
| 19:00 GMT | | Report |

| 23 March 2015 Railway League | Herm Island FC | 0–9 | Northerners | Northfield |
| 19:00 GMT | | Report |

| 2 April 2015 Railway League | Herm Island FC | 0–3 | Centrals 2 | Northfield |
| 19:00 BST | | Report |

| 8 April 2015 Railway League | Herm Island FC | 0–3 | Herm Island Bels | Northfield |
| 19:00 BST | | Report |

| 13 April 2015 Railway League | Rovers AC 3 | 3–0 | Herm Island FC | Port Soif Pitch |
| 18:00 BST | | Report |

| 20 April 2015 Railway League | Herm Island Bels | 3–0 | Herm Island FC | Victoria Avenue |
| 18:00 BST | | Report |

| 27 April 2015 Railway League | Centrals 2 | 3–0 | Herm Island FC | St Peter's |
| 18:00 BST | | Report |

| 29 April 2015 Railway League | United FC | 3–0 | Herm Island FC | Northfield |
| 19:00 BST | | Report |

| 5 May 2015 Railway League | Herm Island | 0–3 | Rangers | Northfield |
| 19:00 BST | | Report |
