= Big Roussel =

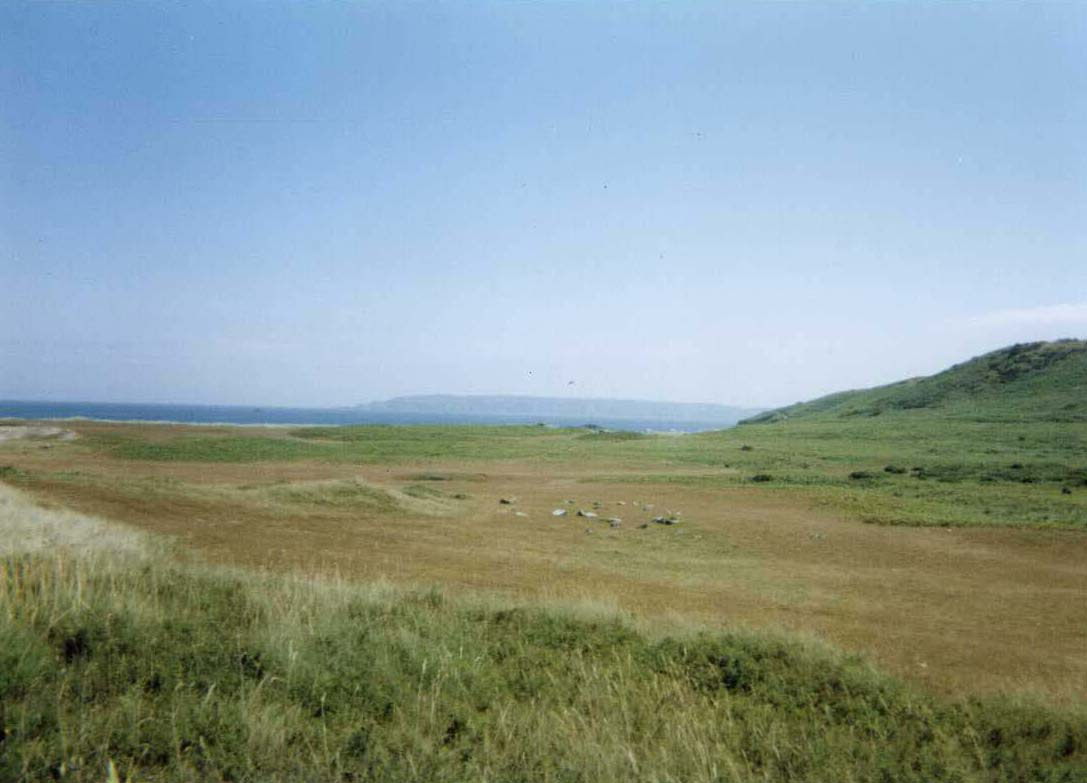
A picture of the north of Herm. The Big Roussel can be seen in the background, along with Sark

The Big/Great Roussel, Big Russel or Grand Ruau is the channel running between Herm on the west, and Brecqhou, and Sark on the east, in the Channel Islands. It has a treacherous current, and the tidal variations in this region are amongst some of the most extreme in the world. It hides a number of sunken rocks.

However, it sees a reasonable amount of marine transport, because Sark has no airstrip, forcing the population to travel to Guernsey by boat.

The Little Roussel (a.k.a. the Little Russel), is the channel running between Herm on the east and St Peter Port on the west.
