= Guernsey Ambulance and Rescue Service =

Emergency services in Guernsey

Guernsey Ambulance and Rescue Service is the ambulance and rescue service of Guernsey, the second largest of the Channel Islands, and also provides these services to other islands within the Bailiwick of Guernsey, both those directly governed, and those that are semi-autonomous dependencies of Guernsey. It is operated as a private company, but is a subsidiary of the Venerable Order of St John. Unlike ambulance services in the United Kingdom and Jersey, emergency ambulance and patient transport services are not free of charge. The service charges patients who do not have a paid annual subscription.

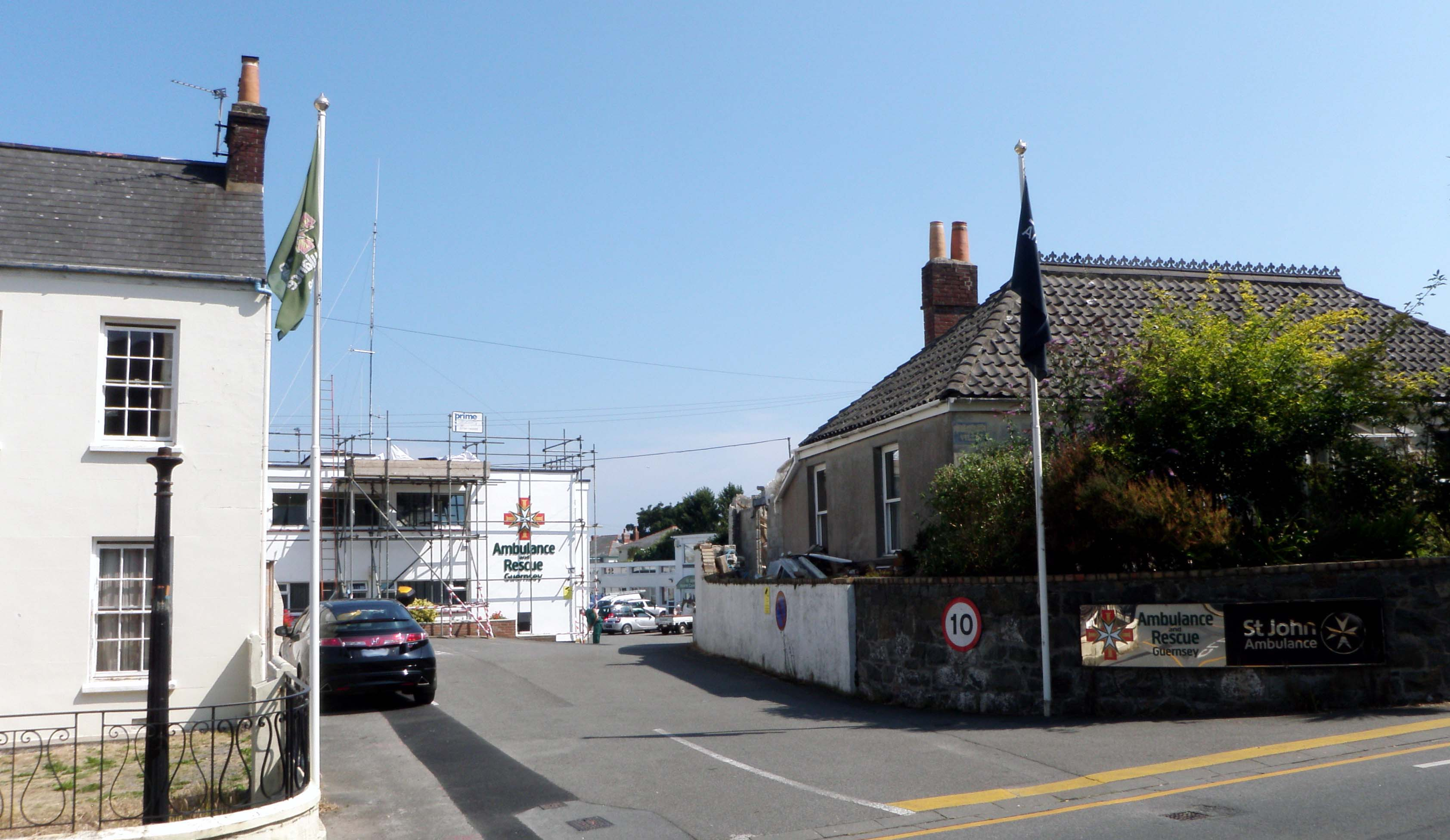
Guernsey Ambulance and Rescue Service headquarters in Rohais, Saint Peter Port

== History ==
The service was established in 1936, and within two years became Guernsey's only ambulance service when it took over the previous States Ambulance Service. Initially operated by, and as a division of, the St John Ambulance, its staff wore the familiar St John Ambulance uniform, and used that organisation's white Maltese cross emblem, until the 1990s. It was the only part of the St John Ambulance Brigade to employ full-time ambulance personnel.

The service was taken over by a registered private company, but with the Director of St John Ambulance (Guernsey) as an ex officio Director. The company operates as a business, but was (until July 2012) a subsidiary of the Priory of England and the Islands of the Venerable Order of St John. This is the same status as that enjoyed by St John Ambulance (England and the Islands), the organisation of which Guernsey Ambulance and Rescue Service was formerly a constituent part.

On 1 July 2012, St John Ambulance in Guernsey ceased to be part of the Priory of England and the Isles, and was established as an autonomous Commandery of the Venerable Order of St John. Thus both St John Ambulance (Guernsey) and the Guernsey Ambulance and Rescue Service (as sister organisations) remain under the umbrella of the Venerable Order of St John, but through independent local control, rather than the English Priory.

== Services ==
=== Guernsey ===
Operating 24 hours a day, the service provides accident and emergency cover and paramedic response, as well as a non-emergency patient transport service. Emergency cover includes the provision of in-shore search and rescue boats, and a marine ambulance. The original St John Ambulance marine ambulance launch in Guernsey was named Flying Christine. The current vessel, launched in 1994, is the third, and is named Flying Christine III.

Emergency calls since March 2015 are routed through the Joint Emergency Services Control Centre, linking police, fire, ambulance and coastguard services.

The service claims to be the only combined ambulance and rescue service in the British Isles. Most British rescue services are associated with fire brigades, rather than ambulance services.

=== Herm ===
The service trains and supervises the small team of community first responders who provide the only emergency medical care on the island of Herm. The volunteers are trained to preserve life, including the use of oxygen, defibrillators, and other emergency equipment, during the typical 45-minute response time involved in getting professional paramedics to Herm from Guernsey.

=== Sark ===
The service also provides support to Sark Fire and Rescue Service the small independent ambulance service on the island of Sark. The service operates two tractor-drawn ambulances and is able to treat casualties and transport them to the harbour for transfer onto the Guernsey marine ambulance launch.
