= Herm =

Guernsey Channel Island

Coordinates: 49°28′N 2°27′W

Herm Haerme (Guernésiais)
- Part of Guernsey, Bailiwick of Guernsey
- Flag Coat of arms
- Anthem: Sarnia Cherie (Guernsey)
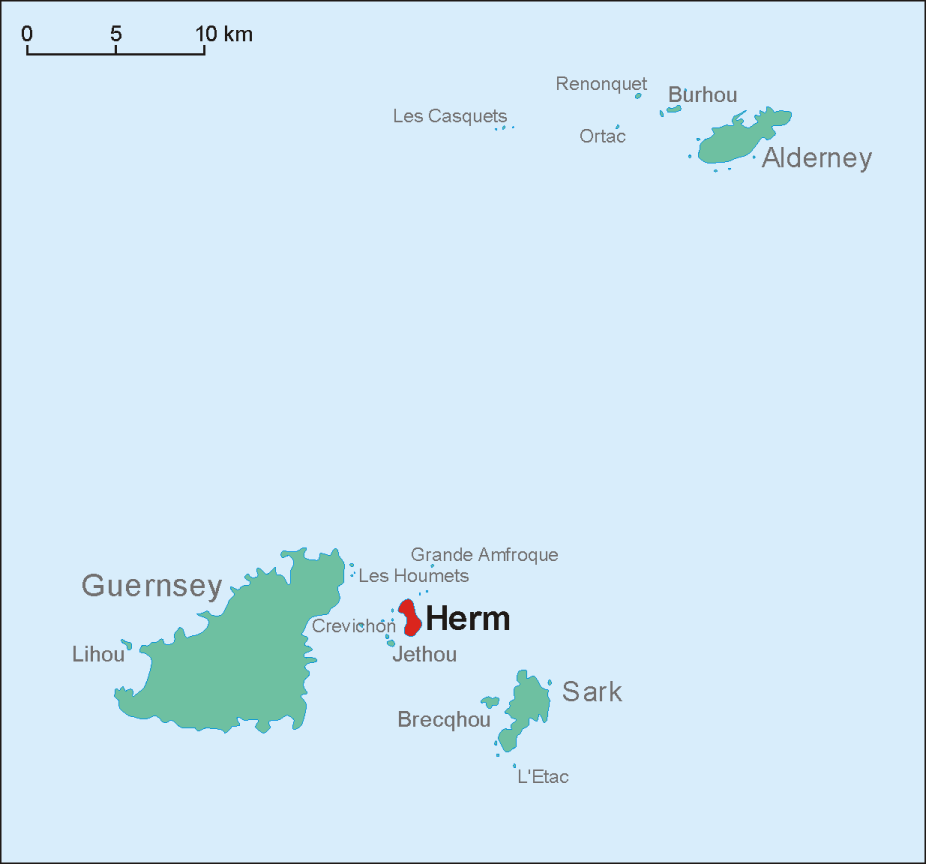
- Dependent territory of bailiwick: Bailiwick of Guernsey
- Crown dependency of Sovereign state: United Kingdom (Note: The UK is the sovereign state that is responsible for Guernsey internationally, Guernsey not being sovereign in its own right. But Guernsey is not part of the UK.)
- Parish: Saint Peter Port
- Official languages: English; Guernésiais; French
- Government: Parliamentary constitutional monarchy
  - Duke: Charles III
  - Lt Governor: Richard Cripwell
  - Tenants: John and Julia Singer

Government of the United Kingdom
  - Minister: Baroness Levitt

Area
  - Total: 2 km^{2} (0.77 sq mi)
  - Water (%): negligible

Population
  - 2002 census: 60
  - Density: 30/km^{2} (77.7/sq mi)
- Currency: Guernsey pound (GBP)
- Time zone: UTC (GMT)
  - Summer (DST): UTC+1 (British Summer Time)
- Date format: dd/mm/yyyy
- Driving side: Left
- Calling code: +44
- UK postcode: GY1–GY8
- ISO 3166 code: GG
- Internet TLD: .gg (Guernsey)

Designations

Ramsar Wetland
- Official name: Herm, Jethou and The Humps
- Designated: 19 October 2015
- Reference no.: 2277

Herm (Guernésiais: Haerme, ultimately from Old Norse armr 'arm', due to the shape of the island, or Old French eremite 'hermit') is one of the Channel Islands and part of the Parish of St Peter Port in the Bailiwick of Guernsey. It is located in the English Channel, north-west of France and south of England. It is 2,183 m (7,162 ft) long and under 873 metres (2,864 ft) wide; oriented north–south, with several stretches of sand along its northern coast. The much larger island of Guernsey lies to the west, Jersey lies to the south-east, and the smaller island of Jethou is just off the south-west coast.

Herm was first discovered in the Mesolithic period, and the first settlers arrived in the Neolithic and Bronze Ages. Many tombs from that period remain today, the majority in the north of the island. The island was annexed to the Duchy of Normandy in 933, but was transferred to the English Crown with the division of Normandy in 1204. It was occupied by Germany in the Second World War and was the target of Operation Huckaback, but was largely bypassed. Herm is currently managed by Herm Island Ltd. The company was formed by Starboard Settlement, which acquired Herm in 2008, following fears during the sale of the island that the 'identity' of the island was at threat.

Herm's harbour is on its west coast. There are several buildings of note in the vicinity, including the White House, St Tugual's Chapel, Fisherman's Cottage, The Mermaid pub and restaurant, and a small primary school with about eight pupils. During a busy summer season, up to 100,000 tourists visit the island, arriving by one of the catamaran ferries operated by the Trident Charter Company. Cars are banned from the island, as are bicycles, although quad bikes and tractors are allowed for staff and luggage transport, respectively.

== History ==
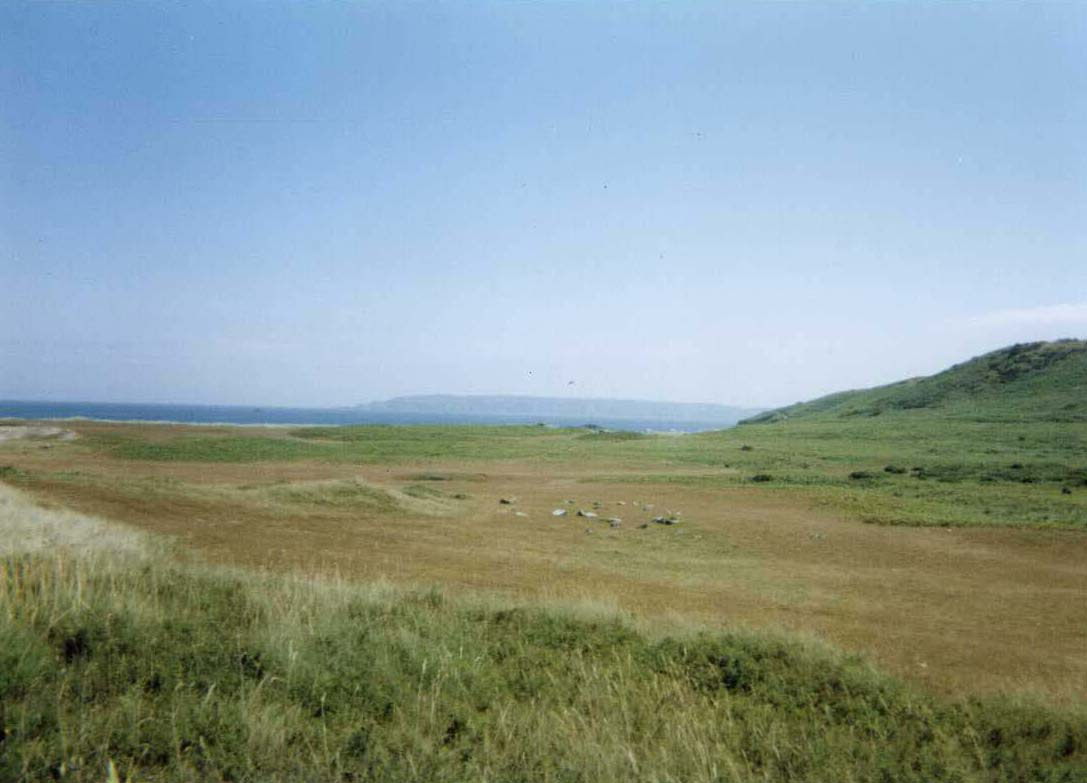
The common in the north of the island. Standing stones can be seen on the grass, while the island of Sark lies in the background.

=== Prehistory ===
Herm was first found in the Mesolithic period (between 10,000 and 8,000 BC), when hunters were in search of food. In the Neolithic and Bronze Ages, settlers arrived; the remains of chamber tombs have been found on the island, and may be seen today; specifically on the Common, and the Petit and Grand Monceau; it has been suggested that the northern end of the island, i.e. the Common, was set apart for burials. After a three-year project by the University of Durham, supported by specialists from the University of Cambridge, the University of Oxford, and the Guernsey museum, they stated that the "density of tombs suggests that the northern end of Herm may have been a place set apart for funerary activity".

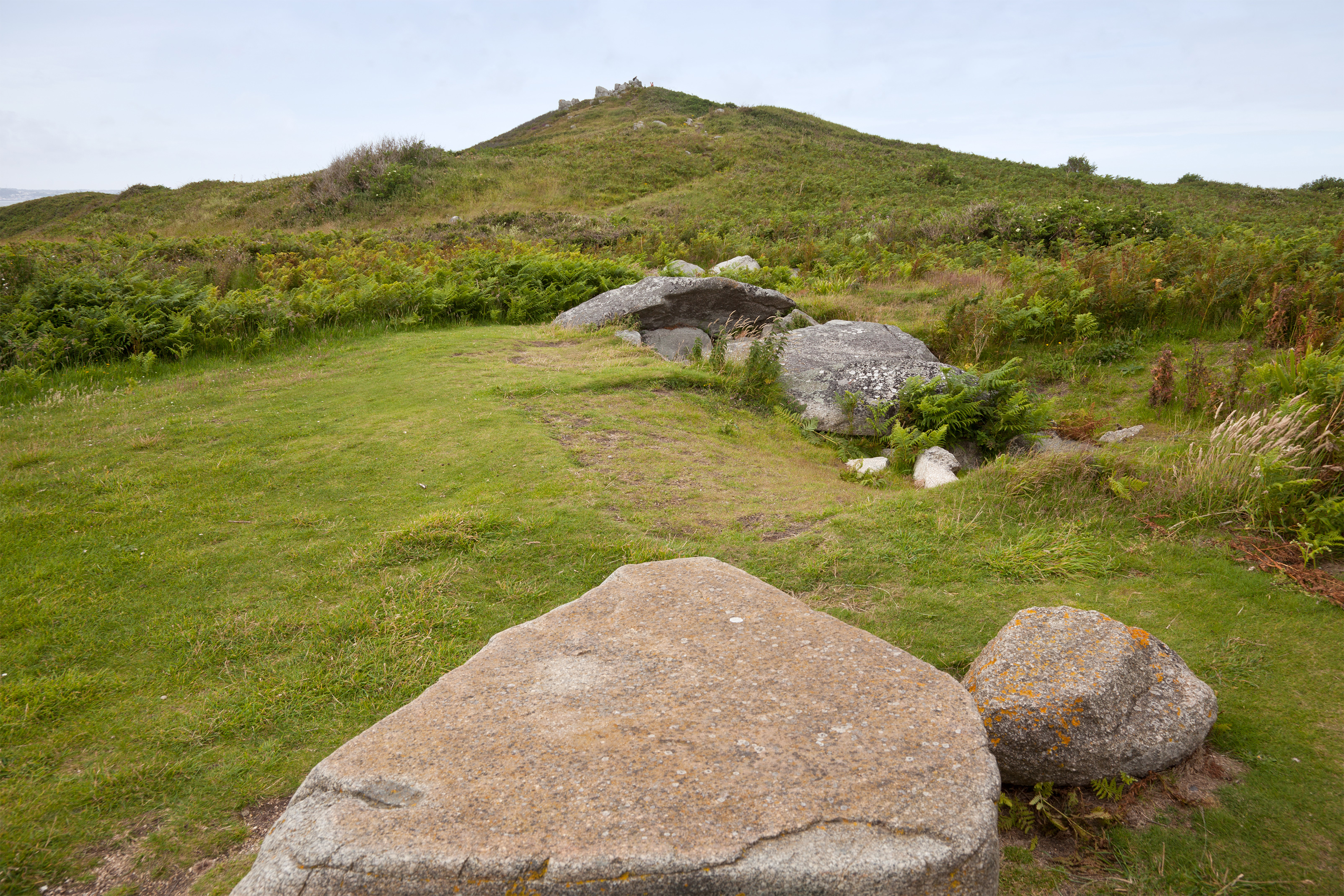
A prehistoric grave, known as Robert's Cross

=== Middle Ages ===
The first records of Herm's inhabitants in historic times are from the 6th century, when the island became a centre of monastic activity; the followers of Saint Tugual (also called Tudwal) arrived, establishing Saint Tugual's Chapel. In 709 AD, a storm washed away the strip of land which connected the island with Jethou.

An important moment in Herm's political history was in 933 AD, when the Channel Islands were annexed to the Duchy of Normandy, they remained so until the division of Normandy in 1204, when they became a Crown Dependency. In 1111 Brother Claude Panton was a hermit in "Erm" and in 1117 the then hermit, Brother Francis Franche Montague is recorded as living on "Erm". After the annexation, Herm gradually lost its monastic inhabitants, and between 1570 and 1737 the governors of Guernsey used it as a hunting ground; visiting to shoot, hunt, and fish.

=== 19th century to the Second World War ===
In 1810, an inn was founded; and during the Industrial Revolution, roads, paths, a harbour, accommodation, a forge, blacksmiths, a brewery, a bakery and a prison were built to cater for the largest number of inhabitants since prehistoric times. Most were quarrymen working in new granite quarries. Several quarries can still be seen at present, such as on the Common. When Prince Gebhard Fürst Blücher von Wahlstatt and Princess Blücher leased the island from the British government in 1889, he introduced a colony of red-necked wallabies to the island, which lasted until 1910. Offspring were "said to have been eaten as food by English soldiers occupying the island during World War 2".

Compton Mackenzie, an English-born Scottish novelist, acquired the tenancy in 1920. He recalled that his three years there had numerous logistical problems. It has been suggested that Mackenzie was the basis for the character Mr Cathcart in D.H. Lawrence's The Man who Loved Islands, about a man who moved to ever smaller islands much as Mackenzie moved from Herm to the smaller Jethou, but Lawrence himself denied it. Percival Lea Dewhurst Perry was the tenant from 1923 to 1939.

The German occupation of the Channel Islands during the Second World War essentially by-passed Herm. The island was claimed on 20 July 1940 by Nazi Germany, a few weeks after the arrival of German troops in Guernsey and Jersey; German soldiers landed on the island to shoot a propaganda film, The Invasion of the Isle of Wight. Herm's sandy beaches were soon used for practising landings from barges, in preparation for the invasion of England, but otherwise the island saw little of the Germans beyond officers making trips to shoot rabbits. Herm had only a little German construction during the war; a flak battery was placed on the island for a few weeks, and mines were placed in an area. Occasionally German soldiers would travel to Herm to cut wood for fuel.

==== Operation Huckaback ====
Operation Huckaback was a British Second World War military operation that was originally designed to be a raid on Herm, Jethou and Brecqhou, but instead became only a raid on Herm undertaken on the night of 27 February 1943, following an earlier attempt that had been aborted. Ten men of the Small Scale Raiding Force and No. 4 Commando under Captain Patrick Anthony Porteous landed 200 yards to the north-west of Selle Rocque on a shingle beach and made several unsuccessful attempts to climb the cliff in front of them. Porteous finally managed to climb up the bed of a stream and pulled the others up with a rope. They later reported that they had found no sign of any Islanders or Germans (who were supposed to be billeted near the harbour). They had failed to make contact with the few civilians on the island whose duties included looking after the sheep.

=== Since 1945 ===
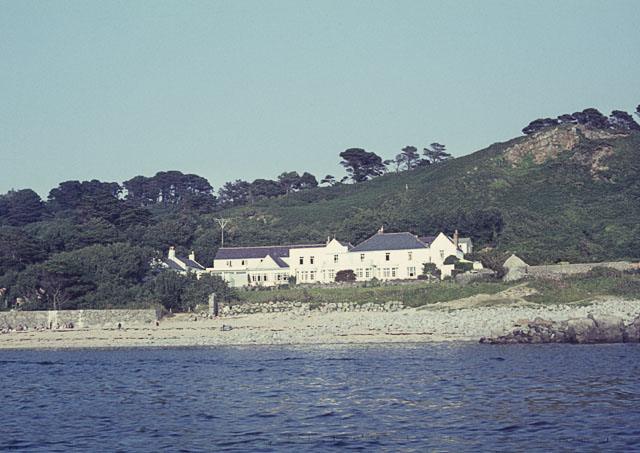
White House, Herm

In 1949, the States of Guernsey bought Herm from the Crown because of the "unspoilt island idyll that could be enjoyed by locals and tourists alike". One of the island's most influential tenants was Major Peter Wood, who looked after the island from 1949 to 1980 with his wife. The island was run down when he arrived, with the manor hidden in undergrowth, the windows and roofs of the houses having been blown off by a sea mine drifting into the harbour shortly after their arrival, but they created a school, and restored St Tugual's Chapel. Major Wood's daughter Pennie Wood Heyworth and her husband Adrian succeeded them; Major Wood died in 1998. Their early efforts are recorded in Herm, Our Island Home, written by Major Wood's wife Jenny Wood.

On 17 May 2008, the BBC reported that the tenants had put the remaining 40 years of their lease up for sale, with an asking price of £15,000,000. Within four days, there were over 50 potential buyers. In September 2008 it was announced that Starboard Settlement, a trust, had acquired the remainder of the lease for considerably less than the asking price. The trust formed a company based in Guernsey, Herm Island Ltd, to manage the island for the trustees.

In 2013, negotiations for a 21-year extension to the lease broke down, with the tenant offering £440,000 and the owner requesting £6,000,000 plus improvements to infrastructure, the offer was later reduced to £2.44 million. In 2023 the lease to Starboard Settlement Charitable Trust was extended to 2069 for an undisclosed sum.

== Geography and geology ==
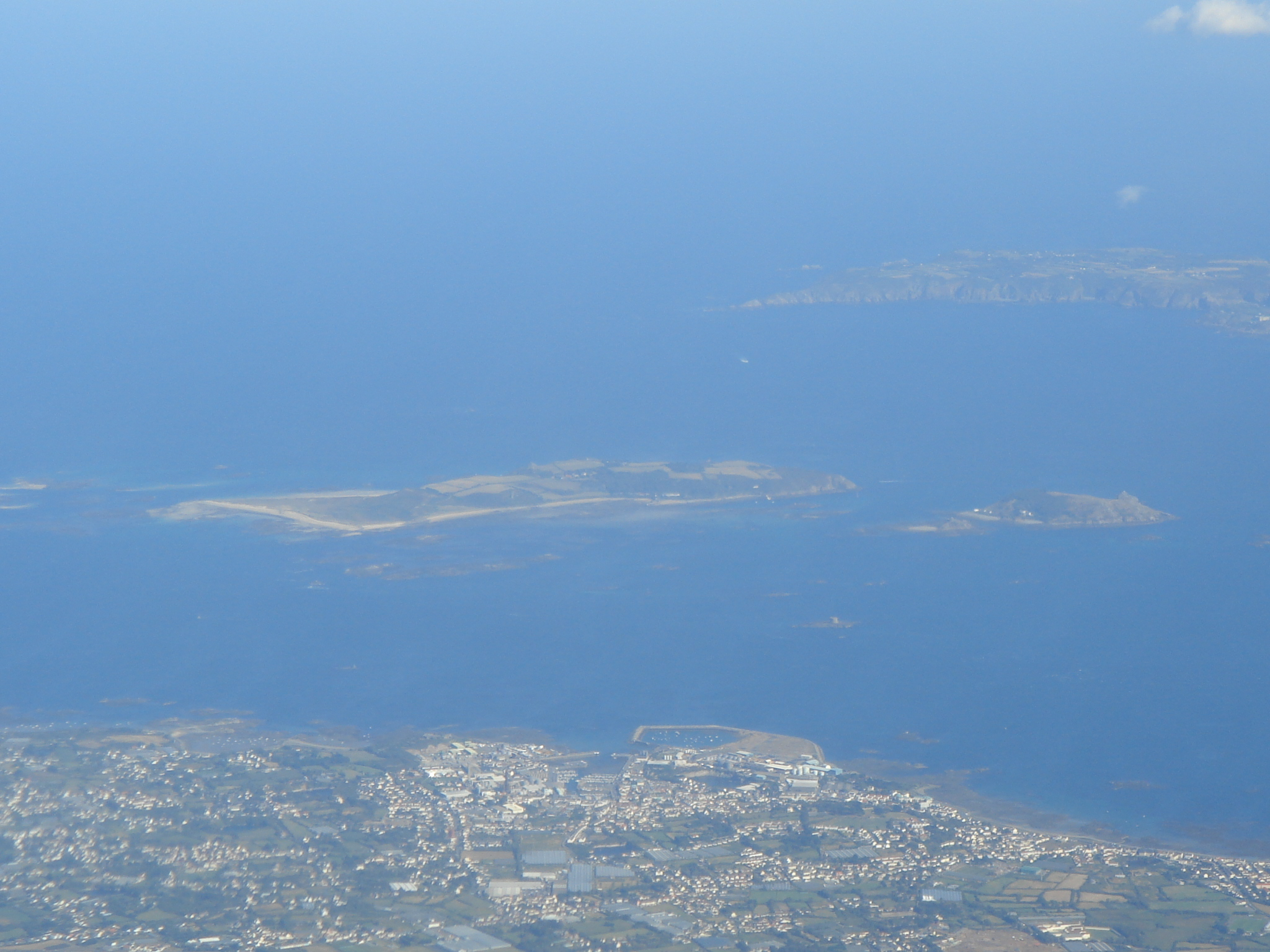
An aerial shot showing Herm (centre), Jethou to the right, Sark in the right background and Guernsey in the foreground

Herm is only 1 1/2 miles long (north-south) and less than half a mile wide (east-west). In the northern part of the island are two hills, Le Petit Monceau and Le Grand Monceau. To the north of these is a common, leading to Mouisonniere Beach on the northern coast, with Oyster Point in the northwestern corner and La Pointe du Gentilhomme or Alderney Point at the northeastern corner. To the east of the common is Shell Beach and to the west is The Bear's Beach, leading down to the harbour. Half of the coastline of the northern part of the island is surrounded by sandy beaches; the southern half is rocky. Much of Herm's bedrock is granite. In 2008, Adrian Heyworth, who was at the time the island's tenant, said that two or three metres of sand were being lost annually at Alderney Point. The northernmost point of the island, Alderney Point, sits directly south of the Isle of Portland.

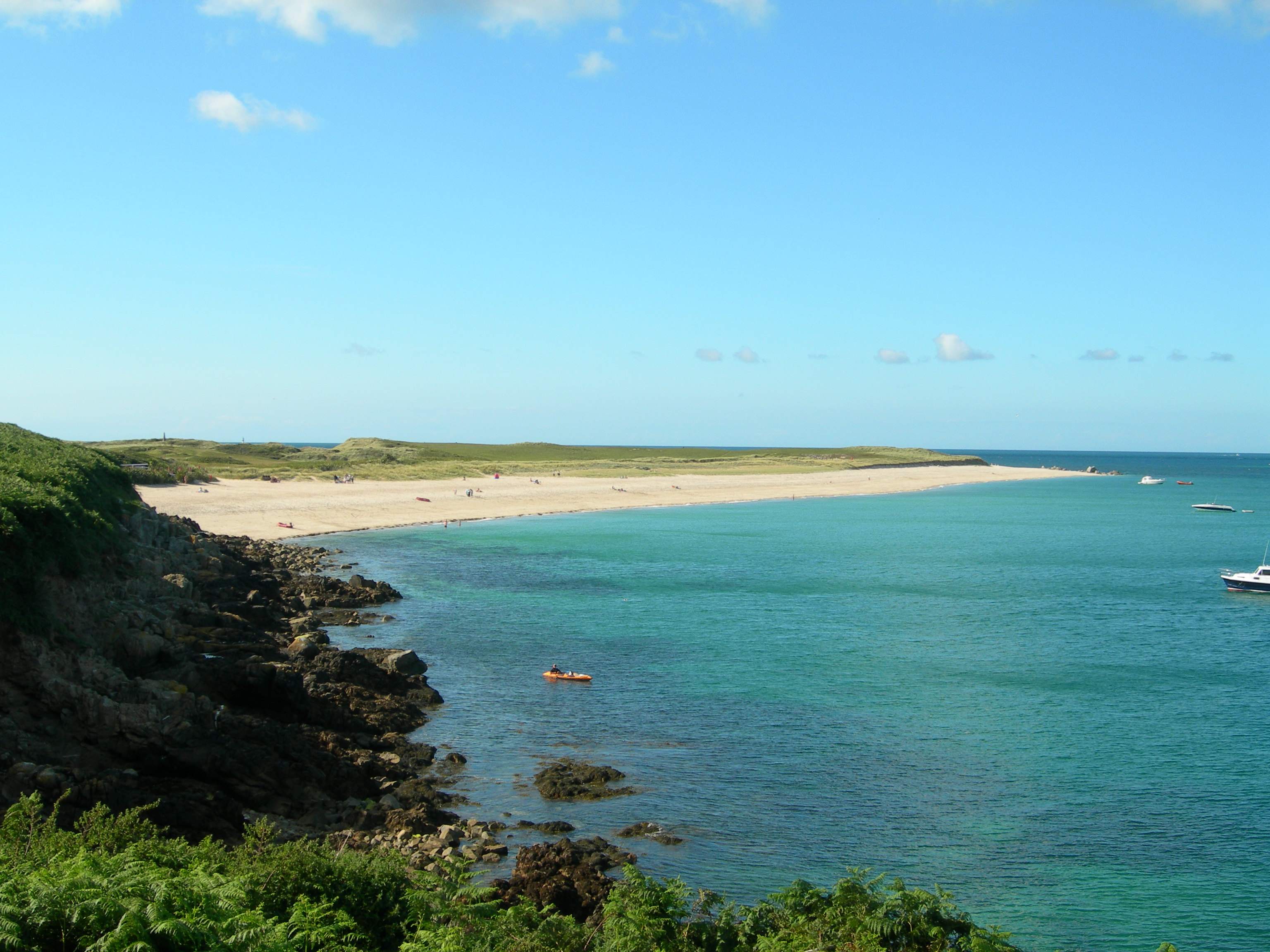
Shell Beach, northeastern coast

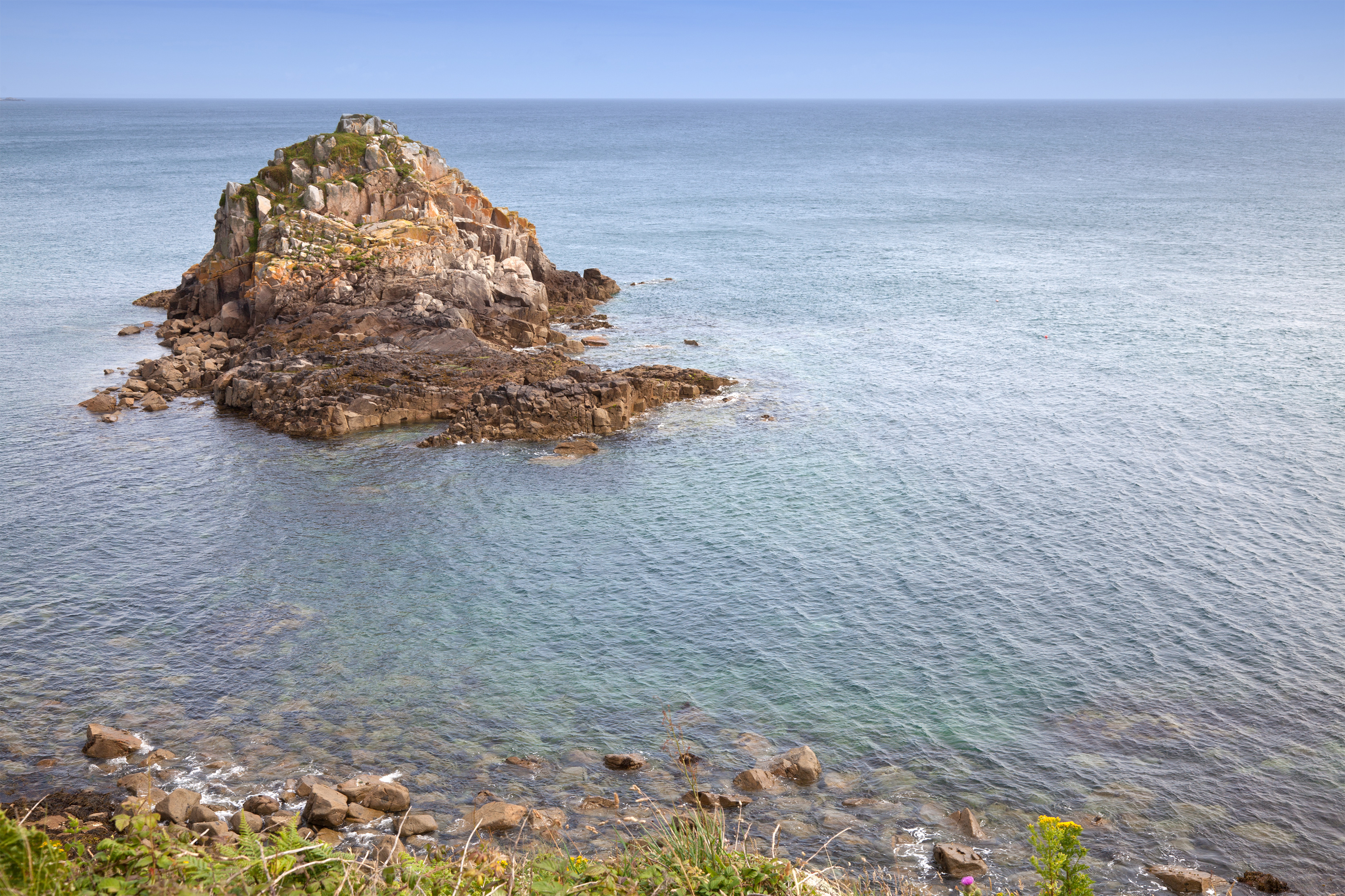
Caquorobert, east coast of Herm

Off the northwestern coast of Herm is the islet of Le Plat Houmet, and beyond that Fondu, which like Herm belongs to Guernsey. In Belvoir Bay on the eastern side of the island are the islets of Mouliere, situated off Frenchman's Point, which is to the northeast of the manor village, and Caquorobert, the latter of which can be accessed at low tide via a vaguely marked path. To the south of this off the southeastern coast is Puffin Bay, which contains the islet of Putrainez near the coast and the islet of Selle Rocque further out to the south. The far southwestern point of the island is Point Sauzebourge, and Bishop's Cove is just to the north of this. North of the cove and south along the beach from the harbour and White House are the Rosiere Steps, with a quarry and cottage of the same name in the vicinity. The Mouette and Percee reefs are offshore here. Hermetier, also known as Rat's Island, lies about 250 m (820 ft) off the western coast between Fisherman's Beach and The Bear's Beach, to the north of the harbour, linked by a low causeway from the beach. The islet can be accessed at low tide from the beach around Fisherman's Cottage.

The isle of Jethou is around three-quarters of a mile to the southwest beyond Point Sauzebourge. It is possible that in AD 709 a storm washed away the strip of land that connected Jethou to Herm. About 215 m (705 ft) off the northern coast of Jethou is the islet of Crevichon, which measures about 212 by 168 m (696 by 551 ft), with an area of less than three hectares. To the west, between Herm and Guernsey, lies the channel Little Roussel (Petit Ruau); between Herm and Sark, to the east, lies the Big Roussel (Grand Ruau). Bréhon Tower, a Victorian-era fortification, is in the Little Roussel between Herm and Saint Peter Port. The tower was created between 1854 and 1856 by Thomas Charles de Putron (1806–1869) using granite from Herm.

== Politics ==
Herm is part of the St Peter Port parish of Guernsey but is not part of any canton. It belonged to the Electoral District of Saint Peter Port South, until the binding 2018 referendum implemented a single, island-wide constituency of which Herm was a part. It is rented out to various tenants. Unlike the largely autonomous islands of Sark and Alderney within the Bailiwick, Herm is administered entirely by the States of Guernsey.

Cars and bicycles are banned from Herm, in order to keep "peace and tranquillity". Herm does allow quad bikes and tractors for staff and luggage transport, respectively.

=== Tenants ===
On 21 May 1737, Herm officially became a Crown owned 'fee farm' and was leased to the first tenant of Herm, a Guernsey farmer Peter Carey. The original lease was for 61 years at £14 per year, with renewal options every 21 years.

Holders of the post of tenant of Herm:

- Carey Family (1737–1771)
- de Jersey Family (acquired the lease circa 1771)
- Pierre Mauger, an innkeeper (acquired lease circa 1800)
- Hon. Col John Lindsay (1815–1828, acquired lease for £1,200)
- Jonathan Duncan (1828–1837, inherited and took on lease)
- Ebenezer Fernie, via British Commercial Insurance Company (1837–1854, lease acquired)
- Stephen Martin Touzeau (local grocer and boatman) & Job Henry (beekeeper) (1854–1860, jointly bought the lease for £1,500)
- Thomas Bartlett from London (1860–1862, bought lease for £1,000)
- John Thomas Hyde from London (1862–1867)
- Lt. Col Montagu Joseph Feilden from Preston, Lancs (1867–1877, bought lease for £4,000)
- James Considine from Ireland (1877–78, bought for £7,600)
- Arthur Maxwell from Darlington (1878–1882, bought for £7,960)
- Louis Numa Brard and Augustin Claude Broquin, Chartreuse monks from Grenoble (1882–1884, bought for £6,800)
- James Stevens Linklater from Leith, Scotland (1884–1889, bought for £7,500)
- Prince Gebhard Fürst Blücher von Wahlstatt (grandson of Gebhard Leberecht von Blücher); Evelyn, Princess Blücher, also resided (1889–1914). Made to leave the island by the British government at the outbreak of the war in spite of having renounced their former nationality.
- Compton Mackenzie (1920–1923)
- Percival Lea Dewhurst Perry (1923–1939)

During the Second World War, Guernsey was occupied by German forces, and Perry was unable to return to his leasehold as a result. On 29 July 1946 Guernsey bought Herm from the British government for £15,000, but the island continued to operate under a leasehold arrangement.

- A. G. Jefferies (1948–1949)
- Major Alexander Gough (Peter) Wood (1949–1998)
- Adrian Heyworth and Pennie Wood Heyworth (c.1998–2008)
- The Starboard Settlement (John and Julia Singer) (2008– )

== Economy and services ==
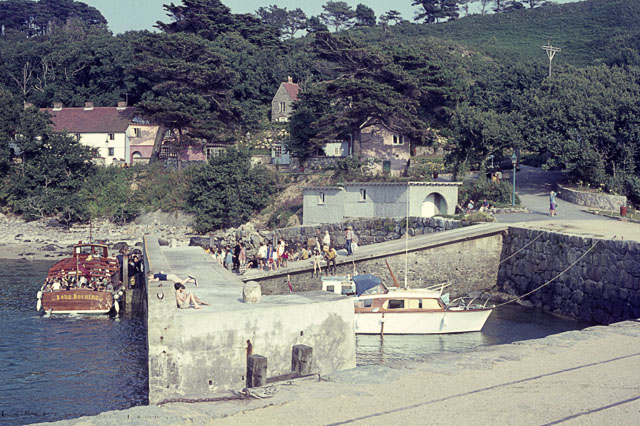
Herm Harbour in 1968

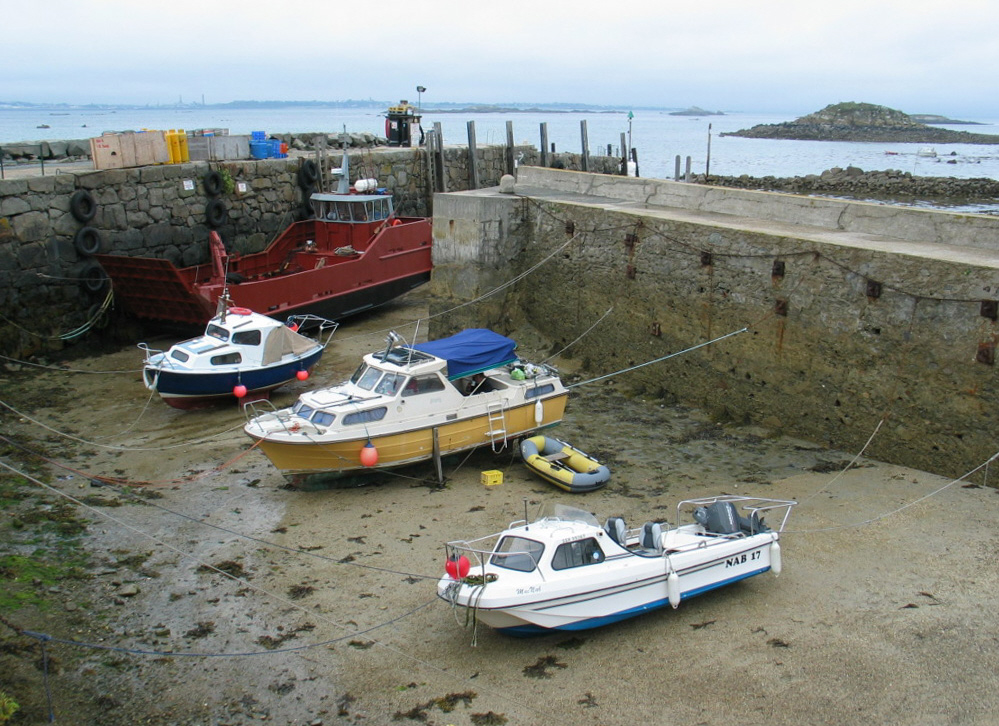
The inner harbour in 2004

=== Tourism ===
Tourism is Herm's main source of income. During a busy summer season, up to 100,000 tourists visit the island, arriving by one of the Travel Trident catamaran ferries. Money is also made from vegetable growing, livestock and the occasional issue of postage stamps, which occurred between 1949 and 1969. The residents in Herm are workers on the island and their families. The island is very popular for camping, particularly favoured by schools in nearby Guernsey or Jersey conducting overnight field trips. There are ample camping grounds.

=== Crime and law enforcement ===
There are three volunteer Special Constables resident on the island, trained and supervised by the States of Guernsey Police Service. On Bank Holidays they are augmented by a visiting full-time Constable from Guernsey. Crime rates on the island are low.

=== Health ===
There are no medical facilities on Herm and no resident doctor. A small team of first aiders and community first responders is maintained amongst the resident population, and receives regular training from the Guernsey Ambulance and Rescue Service, a private company operating on a charitable basis under the umbrella of the Venerable Order of Saint John. Medical evacuation to hospital in Guernsey, where necessary, is achieved by means of the ambulance launch Flying Christine III operated by the Guernsey Ambulance and Rescue Service.

=== Public toilets ===
There are three sets of public toilets on the island, one in the west and two on the east coasts. The facilities on the east coast sit in between Shell Beach and Belvoir Bay, serving both beaches. The other set of facilities sit about a minute's walk north of the harbour, serving the shops in the village and the harbour itself.

=== Fire service ===
A voluntary fire service operates on the island. Herm Fire Brigade operates a tractor-hauled fire tender with a hose-reel, a pump, a 2,000-litre water tank, and basic fire-fighting equipment which they use while waiting for assistance from the Guernsey Fire Brigade, who also provide the Herm volunteers with training and support.

=== Transport ===
Herm is entirely car-free. Transport around the island is mostly on foot via the footpaths snaking through the island, but quadbikes and tractors are also used by farm and island staff for agricultural activities and carrying luggage. Travel Trident run ferries all year round from St Peter Port in Guernsey. Supplies also arrive on the Travel Trident ferry daily, such as newspapers and stock for island businesses. The ferry docks in Herm Harbour during high tides, but at low tides, the Rosaire Steps are used, which is approximately a five-minute walk from the Harbour.

== Notable landmarks ==
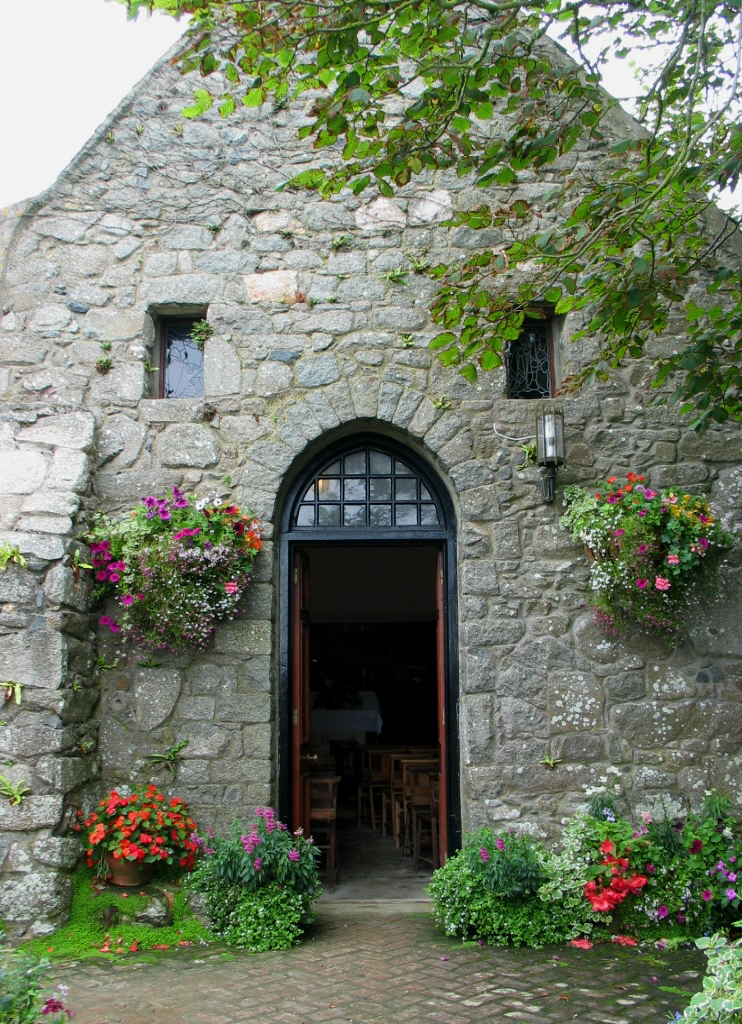
St Tugual's Chapel

The nondenominational St Tugual's Chapel dates to the 11th century, but it is believed that there was a place of worship on Herm as far back as the 6th century, although it has not been confirmed whether the chapel was founded by St Tugual himself or his followers at a later date. The current building is Norman and appears to have been a monastery during medieval times. Of particular note is its stained glass windows featuring Noah's Ark and Guernsey cows and Jesus talking to the fisherman at Herm harbour. In 2010 and 2011, the chapel was closed for restoration work.

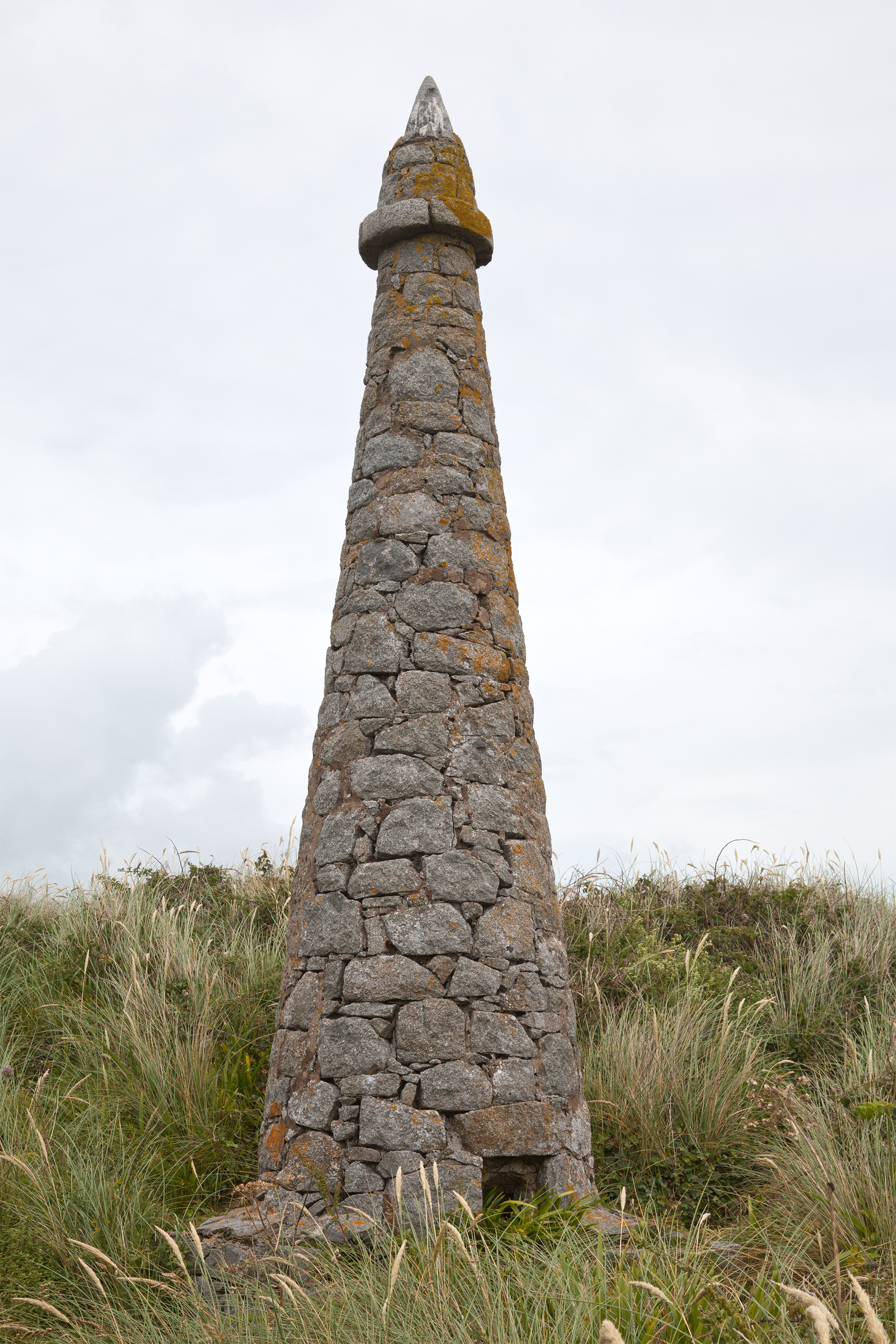
The obelisk on The Common on Herm

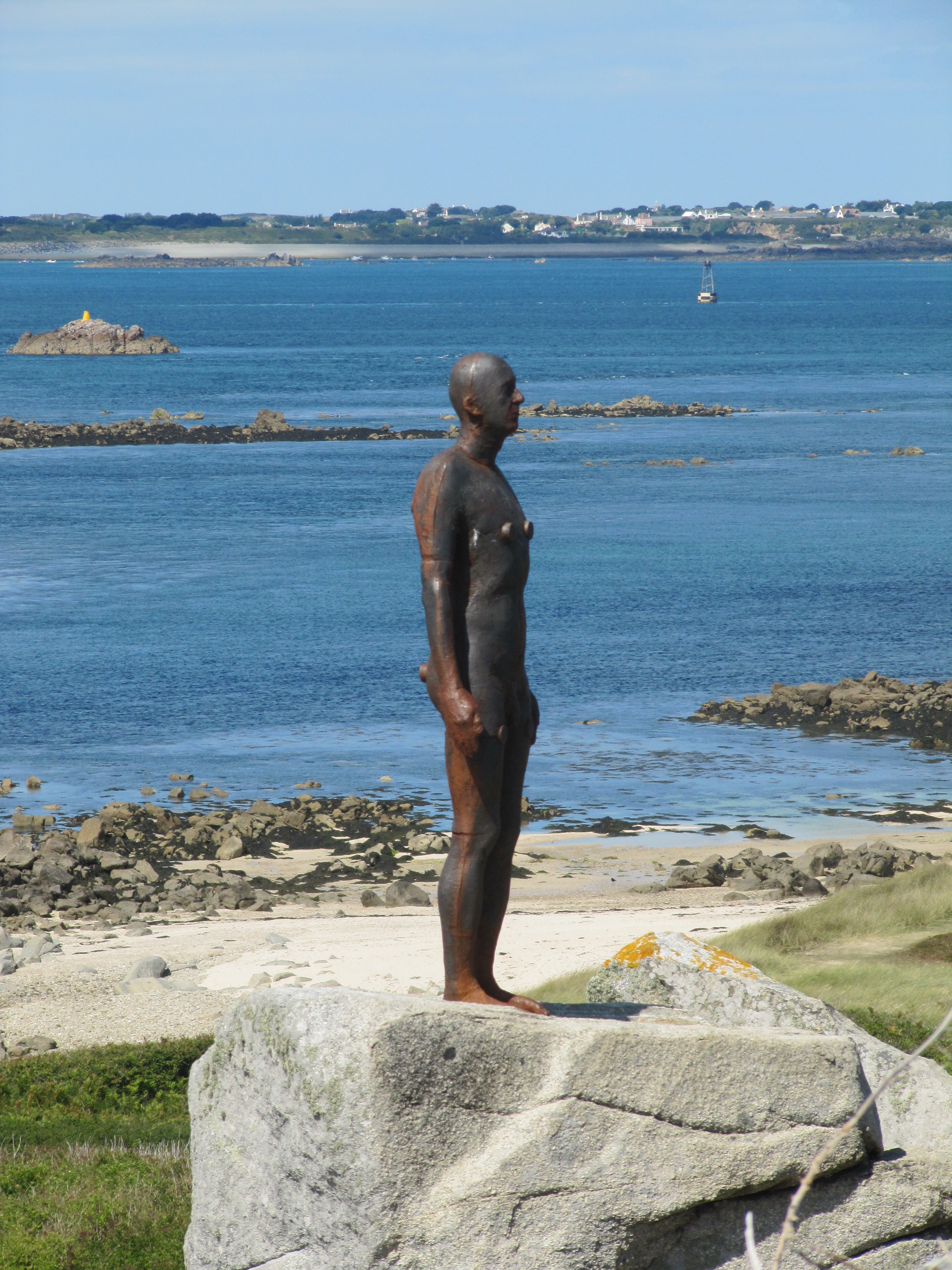
A picture of Antony Gormley's statue, XI (11) in his Another Time series

Other buildings on the island include the White House hotel, "The Mermaid" pub and restaurant, and 20 self-catering cottages. The most notable cottages are Fisherman's Cottage, north of the harbour, and Manor Cottage. There is an obelisk on The Common, in the north of the island. The White House has no clocks, televisions, or phones, which is described as "part of its charm", and has a customer return rate of 70% (i.e. each year, 70% of customers have been before). Herm has no consecrated religious buildings or resident professional clergy, but visiting members of the clergy conduct non-denominational weekly services during the summer months, and monthly services, led by local lay people, are held during the winter.

Sculptor Antony Gormley had a sculpture installed on Herm in 2010, originally planned to be removed after one year, but it received such a positive reception that it was kept for two years, and removed in 2012. The statue was number XI (11) of the Another Time series.

=== Walking around Herm ===
The distance around the perimeter of the island is 6.3 km (3.9 mi) and walking it takes about two hours. If one cuts across the common the distance is 4.5 km (2.8 mi) and takes about an hour and a half. One can walk from the harbour to Rosaire Steps in about seven minutes. The walk from the harbour to Shell Beach takes about 20 minutes and from the harbour to Belvoir Bay it takes about 15 minutes. One can also walk in between Belvoir Bay and Shell Beach along the rocky eastern coast of the island. Beginning at the rock pools at Belvoir Bay's northern end, the route passes below the round-island path, and the walk takes about 20 minutes but does not follow a marked path.

Film of walking around Herm in 1948 is held by the Cinema Museum in London, ref: HM0364.

== Education and culture ==
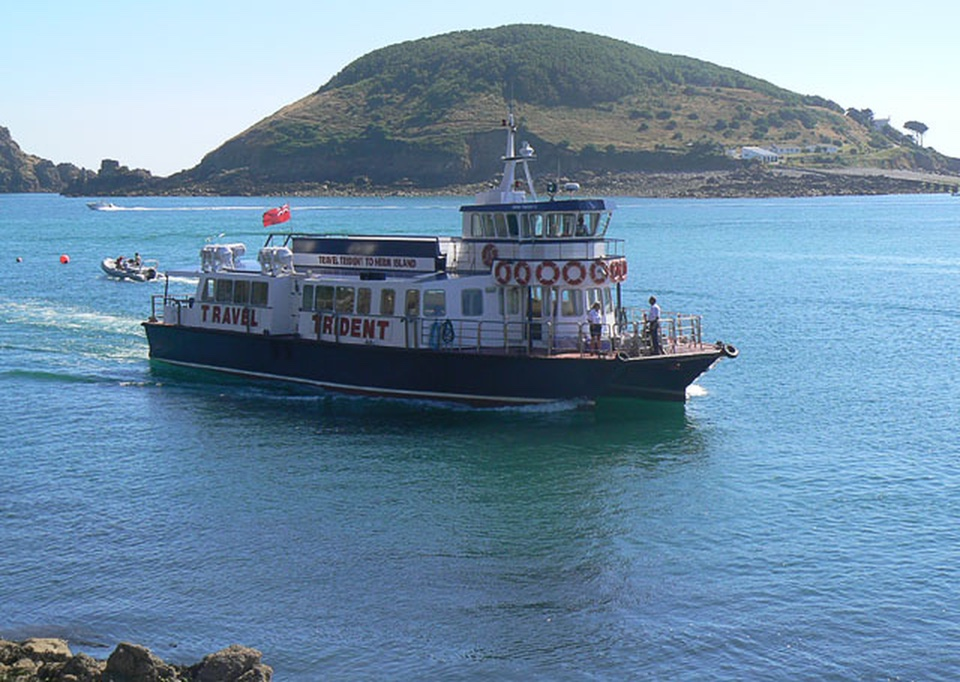
Travel Trident ferry approaching Herm

A number of French/Norman place names remain from the period when the island was in the jurisdiction of the Duchy of Normandy. The Herm Island map, published by the tenant of Herm, states that main place names, including the island name itself, have unclear origins, although there is an unofficial Anglicisation of names; for example, La Pointe du gentilhomme was changed to Alderney Point. The primary present language on Herm is English.

Herm has one primary school, with around eight pupils; their teacher travels from Guernsey daily. Children over eleven are schooled in Guernsey, usually as boarders.

Herm has won Britain in Bloom categories several times: in 2002, 2008, and 2012, Herm won the Britain in Bloom Gold Award.

The island and its history has been depicted in a number of works of literature: the author Compton Mackenzie, who was the island tenant 1920–23, represented it in Fairy Gold, albeit in a fictional portrayal. Jenny Wood, the wife of tenant Major Peter Wood, published her memoirs in 1986. The island's history is told in Hidden Treasures of Herm Island by Catherine Kalamis. Paul Sherman has written two collections of short stories set on the island: Where Seagulls Dare and One Flew Over the Puffin's Nest.

The northern part of the island was recognised in 2016 as an area of international environmental importance under the Ramsar Convention.

=== Sport ===
The island has an amateur football team, Herm Island F.C., which competes in the Railway League, the third tier of football in the Guernsey Football League.

== See also ==
- List of car-free places
