= Caquorobert =

Island off Guernsey in the English Channel

Coordinates: 49°28′17″N 2°26′25″W

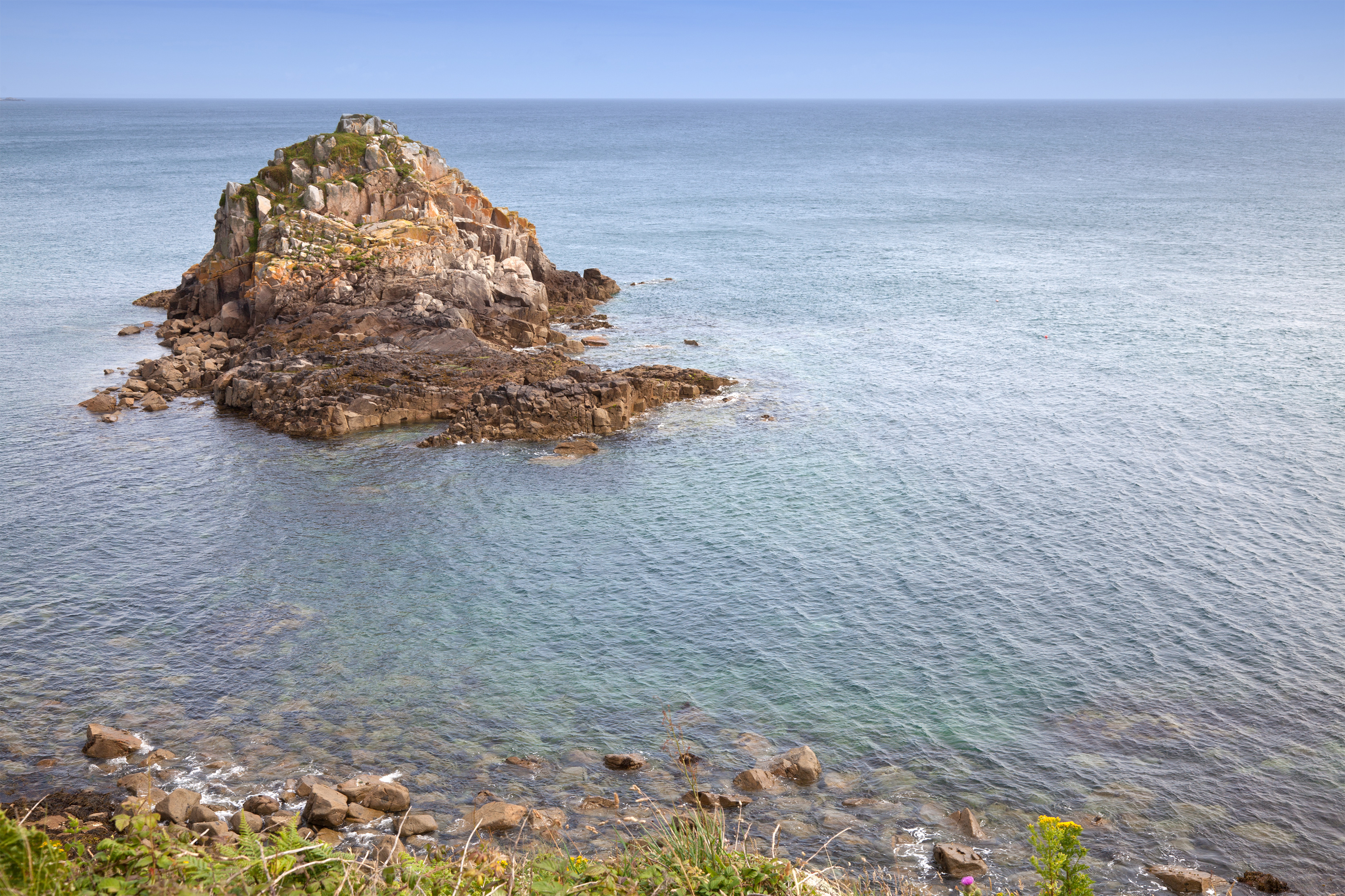
Caquorobert, east of Herm

Caquorobert, also known as Caguerobert, is an uninhabited island in the Bailiwick of Guernsey. It is located near Herm, 250 m to the east. The island can be accessed from Herm on foot at low tide from the round-island Cliff Path, from which the island can also be viewed. The rock is a tied island, and there is a poorly trodden track from the island path which runs down a steep hill to what, at low tide, is a land bridge over to the island. The peak of the island, at about 50 feet elevation, can then be reached by climbing the western side of the island, on which there is no marked path.

The island is accessible for around 3 hours during each tidal cycle. On the western side of the rock two cliff-like edges are visible, each of around two metres in height, the lower of which forms part of a gully which is fully submerged under the tide for most of the day. The eastern side of the rock is more slanted, with a spit which sits out roughly 20 metres at low tide, although the island is difficult to climb from this side owing to it being away from the shore of mainland Herm.

The island sits just off the eastern-most point of Herm, and the climate in the area is temperate. The annual average temperature in the channel is 10 °C. The warmest month is August, when the average temperature is 15 °C, and the coldest is February, with 5 °C. The average annual rainfall is 1,127 millimetres. The rainiest month is January, with an average of 186 mm rainfall, and the driest is September, with 33 mm rainfall.
