= Patrick Anthony Porteous =

Scottish recipient of the Victoria Cross

Patrick Anthony Porteous VC
- Born: 1 January 1918; Abbottabad, British India (now Pakistan)
- Died: 9 October 2000 (aged 82); Funtington, West Sussex, England
- Burial place: St Mary's Churchyard, Funtington
- Military career
- Allegiance: United Kingdom
- Branch: British Army
- Service years: 1937–1970
- Rank: Colonel
- Service number: 73033
- Units: Royal Artillery; No. 4 Commando
- Conflicts: World War II
- Awards: Victoria Cross

Colonel Patrick Anthony Porteous VC (1 January 1918 – 9 October 2000) was a British solder who served as a captain in the British commandos, receiving the Victoria Cross – the British Commonwealth's highest award for valour – for leading a bayonet charge against a German battery in the Dieppe Raid in 1942. He also saw action with the Royal Artillery in France, being evacuated from Dunkirk, and with No. 4 Commando in the D-Day Normandy landings.

== Early life and education ==
Pat Porteous was born on 1 January 1918, at Abbottabad in British India's North-West Frontier Province (now Pakistan), the son of British Indian Army Brigadier-General Charles McLeod Porteous of the 9th Gurkhas. He was educated at Wellington College, Berkshire and the Royal Military Academy, Woolwich.

== Second World War ==
=== B.E.F. ===
Porteous was commissioned in the Royal Regiment of Artillery in 1937. At the outbreak of war, he served in the British Expeditionary Force in France, with the 6th AA Regiment RA. In 1940 he was evacuated from Dunkirk. Back in England, on 26 August 1940 he was promoted to lieutenant and at the end of that year volunteered for No. 4 Commando.

=== Dieppe ===
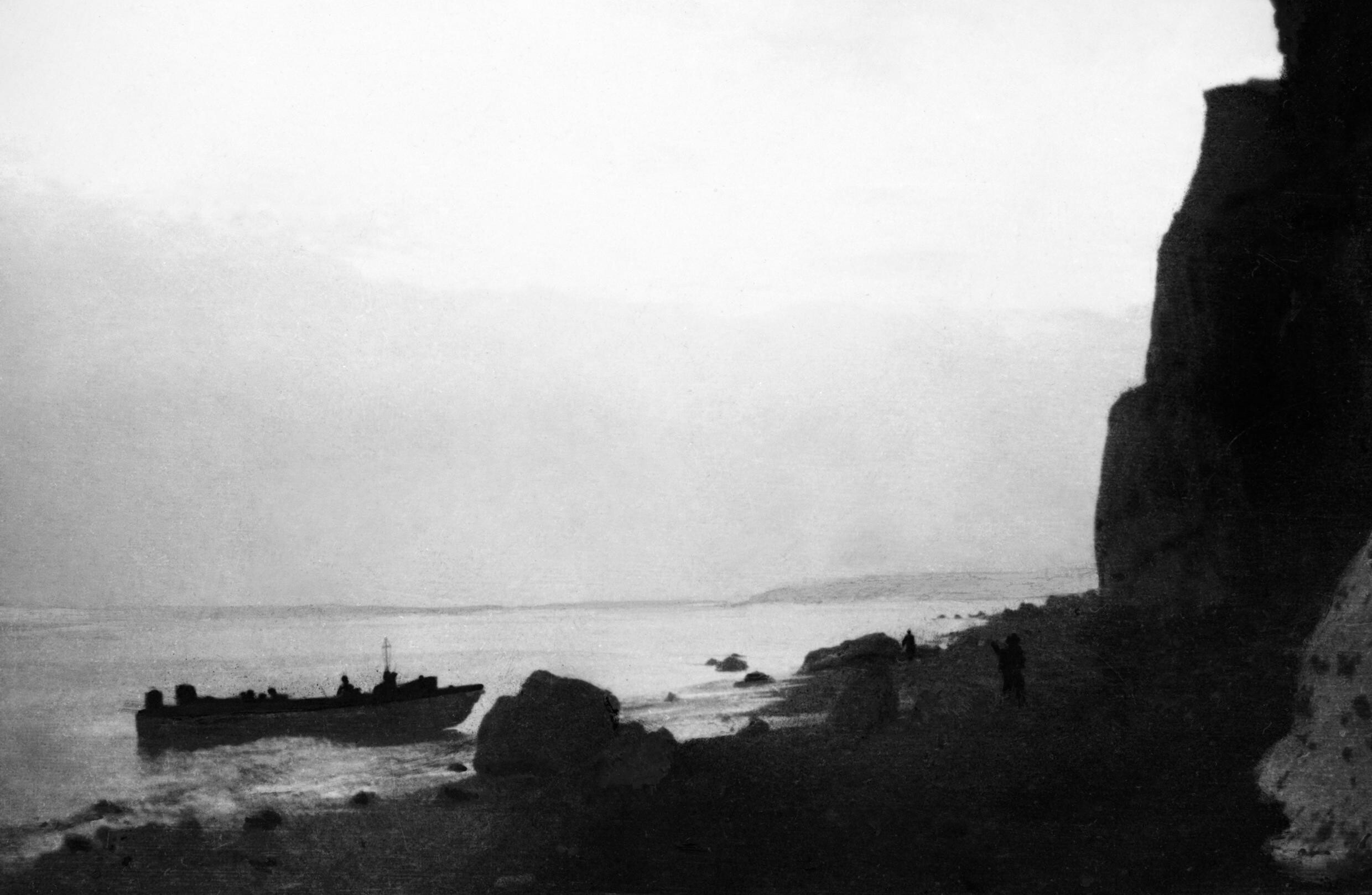
Landing craft of No 4 Commando running in to land at Vasterival, on the right flank of the main assault at Dieppe.

On 19 August 1942, he was 24 years old and a temporary major attached to No. 4 Commando when he did the deed for which he was awarded the VC, during the Dieppe Raid. The citation was published in a supplement to The London Gazette of 2 October 1942 and read:

War Office, 2nd October 1942.

The KING has been graciously pleased to approve the award of The VICTORIA CROSS to: —

Captain (temporary Major) Patrick Anthony Porteous (73033), Royal Regiment of Artillery (Fleet, Hants.).

At Dieppe on the 19th August 1942, Major Porteous was detailed to act as Liaison Officer between the two detachments whose task was to assault the heavy coast defence guns.

In the initial assault Major Porteous, working with the smaller of the two detachments, was shot at close range through the hand, the bullet passing through his palm and entering his upper arm. Undaunted, Major Porteous closed with his assailant, succeeded in disarming him and killed him with his own bayonet thereby saving the life of a British Sergeant on whom the German had turned his aim.

In the meantime the larger detachment was held up, and the officer leading this detachment was killed and the Troop Sergeant-Major fell seriously wounded. Almost immediately afterwards the only other officer of the detachment was also killed.

Major Porteous, without hesitation and in the face of a withering fire, dashed across the open ground to take over the command of this detachment. Rallying them, he led them in a charge which carried the German position at the point of the bayonet, and was severely wounded for the second time. Though shot through the thigh he continued to the final objective where he eventually collapsed from loss of blood after the last of the guns had been destroyed.

Major Porteous's most gallant conduct, his brilliant leadership and tenacious devotion to a duty which was supplementary to the role originally assigned to him, was an inspiration to the whole detachment.

=== Normandy ===
In spite of severe wounds, Porteous went on to make a full recovery and he returned to the same unit. He was second in command of No 4 Commando, which was part of 1st Special Service Brigade when he took part in the D-Day invasion of Normandy on 6 June 1944, going ashore at Sword Beach, the easternmost sector.

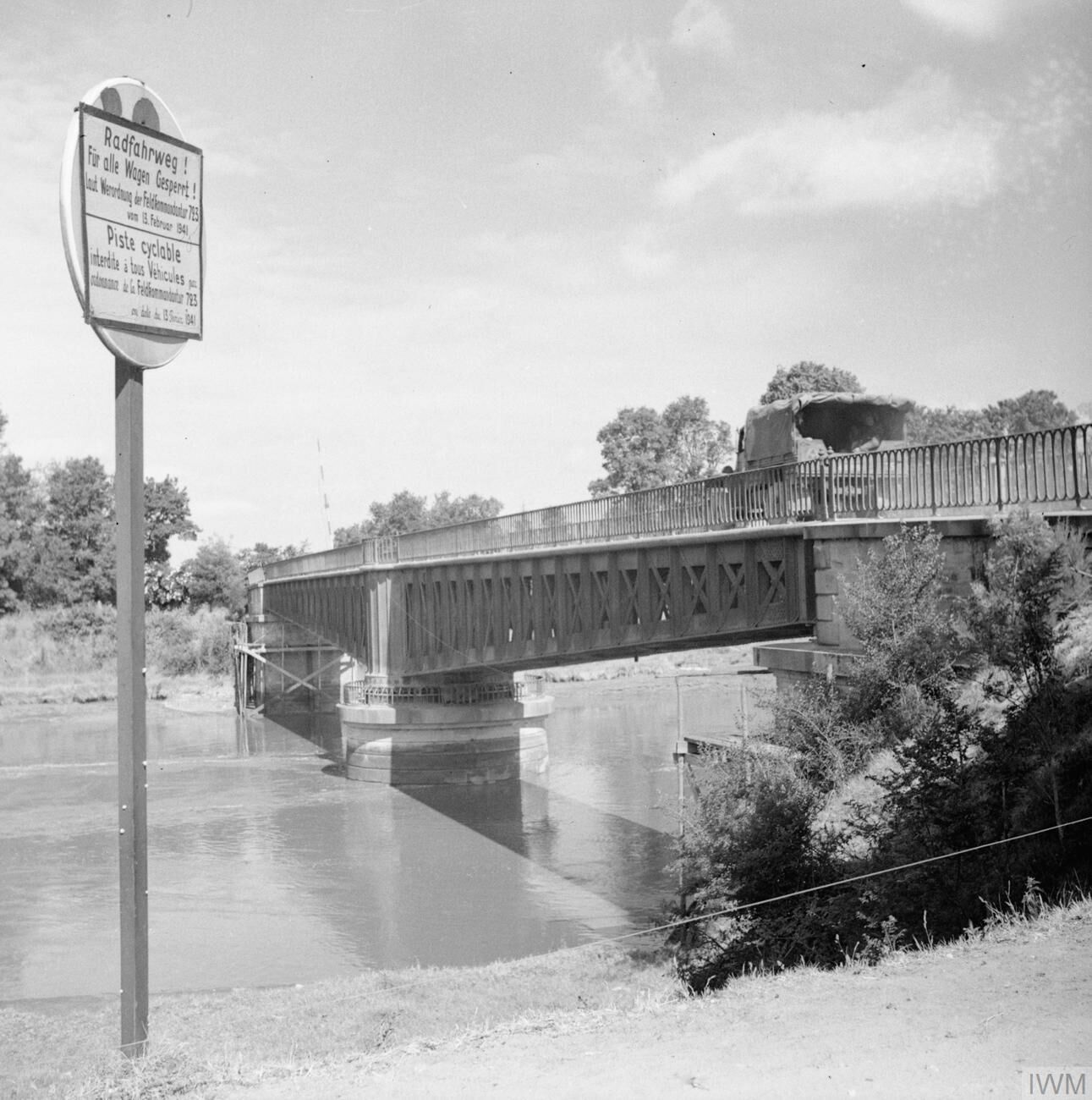
The Orne River Bridge, a vital viaduct near Caen

Subsequently, the commandos from the 1st Special Service Brigade advanced inland from the invasion beaches to relieve the 6th Airborne Division at the Orne bridgehead. The 1st Special Service Brigade, which temporarily came under the command of the paratroop division, was holding villages to the north and north-east of Drop Zone N. As part of the Battle of Bréville, Captain Porteous led D Troop in a charge against infiltrating German infantry, even though outnumbered by at least two to one, killing some and routing the rest. In October 1944 he returned to the Royal Artillery and saw further action with 1st Airlanding Light Regiment.

== Post-war career ==
Following the war he was confirmed in the rank of captain. Porteous went on to have a distinguished military career in Palestine, Germany and Singapore. He was promoted to major in 1950, lieutenant colonel on 1 May 1959, and rose to the rank of colonel before he retired in 1970. Half a century after the events, Colonel Porteous criticized Louis Mountbatten's notion that valuable lessons were learned at Dieppe, "Absolute nonsense. We could have learned as much in Weymouth Bay". He had the honour of being in the leading car at the Queen Mother's 100th Birthday Parade, before his death in October 2000, aged 82.
