= Crevichon =

Islet in the English Channel

Coordinates: 49°27′46″N 2°27′53″W

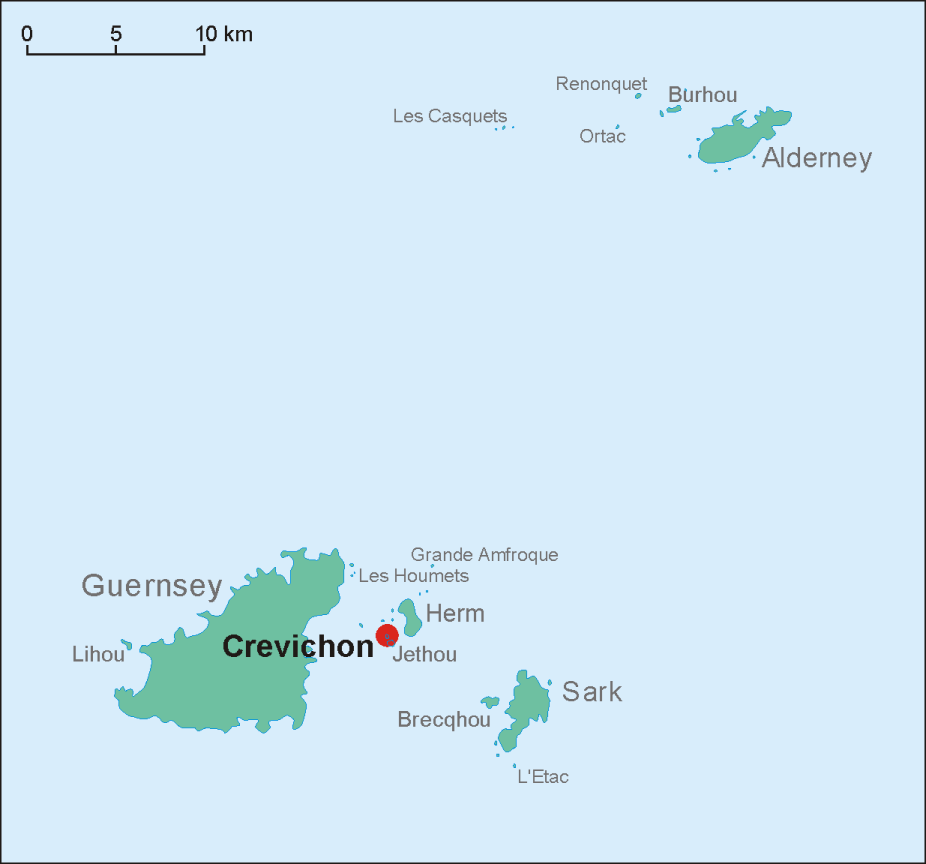
Location map of Crevichon

Crevichon

Crevichon is an islet off the west coast of Herm, immediately to the north of Jethou, in the Channel Islands archipelago in the English Channel.

According to S. K. Kellett-Smith, it means "isle of crabs, crayfish or cranes". Like other names in the region, it is Norman in origin. A thousand years ago, the water level was ten feet lower, making these creatures far more abundant there.

== Geography ==
The island measures about 212 by 168 metres (696 by 551 ft), which yields an area of less than three hectares. The distance to Jethou is about 215 metres (705 ft).

== History ==
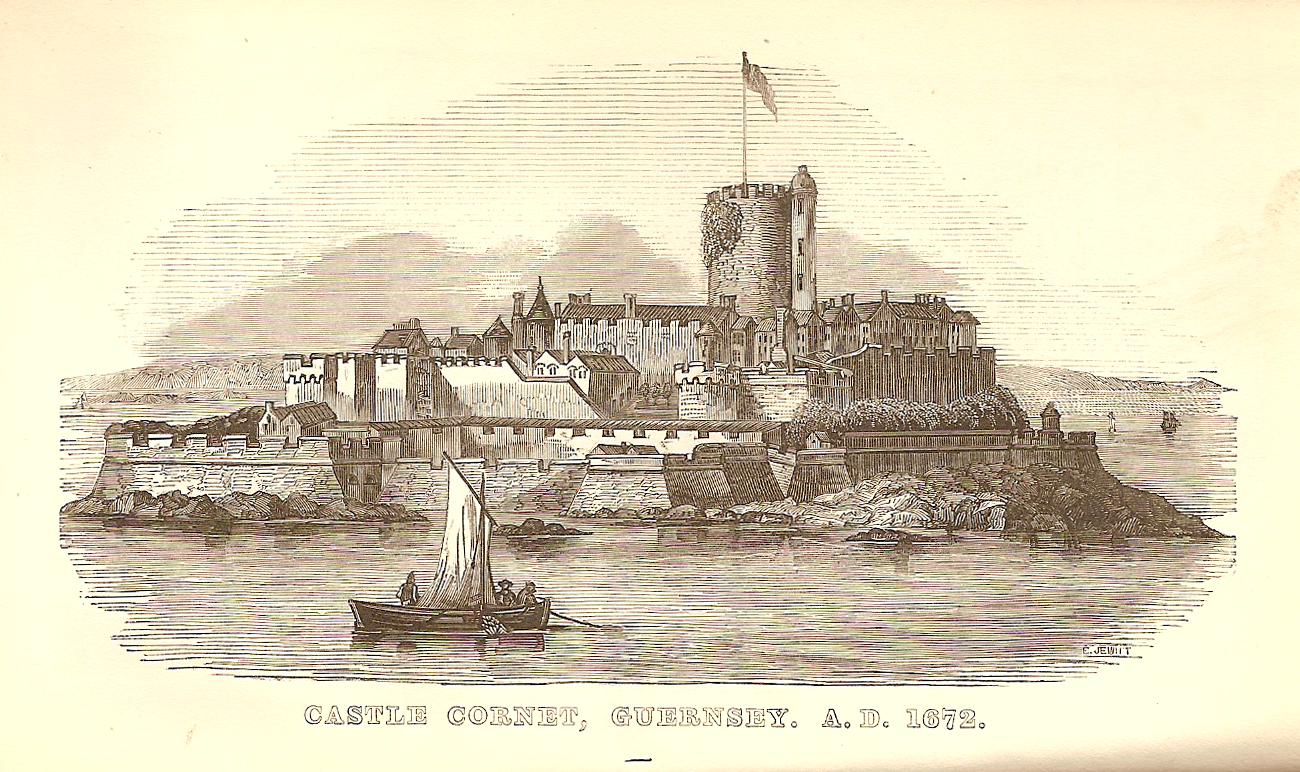
An engraving of Castle Cornet 1672, showing the keep that was destroyed by an explosion later that year. Much of its stone came from Crevichon

A 16th-century drawing, now in the British Museum, shows Crevichon as apparently a wooded islet.

Prof. John Le Patourel, in The Building of Castle Cornet, mentions that in 1566 iron and hammers were taken to "Creavissham", and the island quarried for the castle. The quarry has been used intermittently since then, making the island less visible; to make up for that, a fifteen-foot marker was erected on its peak. Crevichon may have provided the granite for the steps of St Paul's Cathedral in London.

It is said that, in earlier times, pirates were hanged with chains both on Crevichon and on nearby Jethou.

Compton Mackenzie, former owner of Herm, called Crevichon "Merg" in his book Fairy Gold, whose setting is a fictionalised version of the islands.

=== Wrecks ===
In 1953, Victor Coysh says that he saw the remains of a German bomber, from the time of the occupation. The German plane that crashed on Crevichon on 19 November 1940, killing all its crew, was a He 111 that either a British night fighter shot down while the He 111 was flying from France to bomb the south coast of England, or that developed engine trouble on the way.

Other wrecks include the Courier, a Guernsey steamer, that grounded in 1905 with 80 passengers.
