= Renonquet =

Uninhabited islet & reef in the Channel Islands

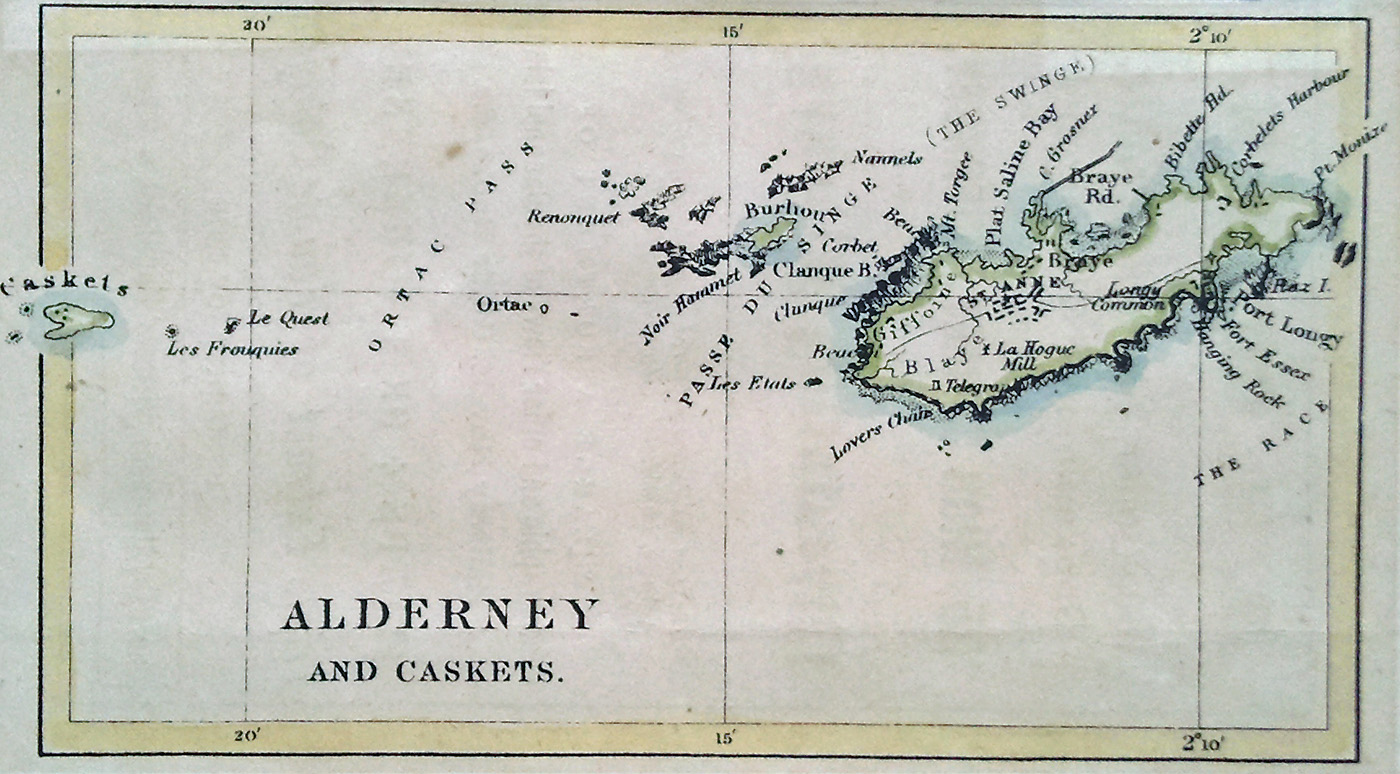
- An 1890 map of Alderney and Les Casquets, where Renonquet is visible.
- Interactive map of Renonquet

Geography
- Location: English Channel
- Archipelago: Channel Islands

Renonquet (/rəˈnɒŋkeɪ/ rə-NONG-kay) is a small uninhabited islet and reef that is part of the Bailiwick of Guernsey in the Channel Islands. It is located 2 miles (3.2 km) northwest of Alderney and less than two kilometres west of the island of Burhou. The island is part of an underwater sandstone ridge. Other parts that emerge above the water are the islets of Burhou, Ortac and Les Casquets. Little vegetation grows on them.

== Etymology ==
Renonquet derives from the Norman French dialect of Auregnais, combining the root renon with the diminutive suffix -quet. The name is thought to stem from the Old French renon (or renom), meaning renown or fame which in a maritime context often referred to a well-known or notorious landmark. The suffix -quet serves as a diminutive.

== History ==
The islet and surrounding reef have been the site of several naval accidents.

On 3 August 1901 HMS Viper ran aground on Renonquet in heavy fog. Strong currents drove the vessel onto the rocks. All the crew were saved. The remains of the vessel were subsequently sold for scrap.

In 2005 the islet and its surrounding reefs were included in the Alderney West Coast and the Burhou Islands Ramsar sites. It serves as a vital breeding ground for seabird colonies including the European storm petrel and the Atlantic puffin.

== Geography ==
Renonquet rises to a maximum height of 10–12 metres (33–39 ft) above sea level and is situated less than 2 km west of the main island of Burhou. It is located 3.7 km (2.3 miles) northwest of the Alderney coastline.

== Ecology ==
Renonquet is a nesting site for several species. It supports colonies of the European storm petrel and the Atlantic puffin. Since 1999, Northern gannets have been observed using Renonquet as a roosting reef.

Renonquet also serves as a known haul-out site for small numbers of grey seals, which use the islet to rest. The surrounding reef system hosts a large number of marine life, including over 100 species of seaweed and rare invertebrates like the green ormer.
