= Auregnais =

Extinct Norman dialect of the Channel Island of Alderney

- Aoeur'gnaeux, Aurignais
- aoeur'gny, auregny
- Native to: Alderney
- Extinct: by c. 1960
- Language family: Indo-European: Italic; Latino-Faliscan; Latinic; Romance; Italo-Western; Western; Gallo-Iberian?; Gallo-Romance; Oïl; Norman; Auregnais
- Early forms: Old Latin: Vulgar Latin; Proto-Romance; Old French; Old Norman

Language codes
- ISO 639-3: –
- Glottolog: None
- Linguasphere: 51-AAA-hcg

Auregnais (French pronunciation: [ɔʁɲɛ]), Aoeur'gnaeux, or Aurignais was the Norman dialect of the Channel Island of Alderney (French: Aurigny, Auregnais: aoeur'gny or auregny). It was closely related to the Guernésiais (Guernsey), Jèrriais (Jersey), and Sercquiais (Sark) dialects of the neighbouring islands, as well as continental Norman on the European mainland.

The dialect became extinct in the 20th century. Only a few examples of Auregnais survived, mostly in place names in Alderney, and one audio recording is known to exist.

== History ==
The last known native speaker of Auregnais died around 1960. Linguist Frank Le Maistre, author of the Dictionnaire Jersiais-Français, recorded the only known audio samples of the language, which he published in 1982.

The last likely rememberer of the language was a Channel Islander author named Royston Raymond, who died in 2019. Raymond had learnt words in Auregnais from his grandparents and, together with teacher Sally Pond, compiled a dictionary in the language.

One reason for the extinction of the language was movement of the population. In particular, the influx of labourers from the United Kingdom employed by the British government in the construction of the abortive harbour project and other fortifications (during the reign of Queen Victoria), as well as the stationing of a sizable British garrison among the small population, served to relegate Auregnais to a lesser status for communication. The evacuation of nearly all indigenous Auregnais to the British mainland during World War II due to the island being occupied by the German Wehrmacht was thought to be a major factor in the final loss of the spoken language.

Another reason for the language's demise was official neglect, especially in the education sector, where it was not taught at all. This led to a situation in which, as was noted by the Guernsey newspaper Le Bailliage in 1880, children had ceased to speak the language among themselves – partly due to teachers discouraging its use in favour of standard French. Along with the decline in Auregnais went the decline in the use of French. French ceased to be an official language in the island in 1966. The official French used in the Channel Islands (see Jersey Legal French) differs slightly from Metropolitan French and greatly from the vernacular Norman.

== Surnames and place names ==
Traces of the language still exist in many, if not most, local placenames. Many of these have been gallicised, but some notable examples include Ortac (Or'tac), Burhou (with the -hou suffix) and the first element of the name "Braye Harbour".

One or two words linger on in the local English, e.g. vraic (seaweed fertiliser – a word common throughout the Channel Islands), and the pronunciation of certain local surnames, e.g. Dupont and Simon as [dipõ] and [symõ] rather than the standard Parisian pronunciation.

== Les Casquets ==
Unusually, for such a small dialect, Auregnais used to have an exclave or "colony" of speakers on Les Casquets for a number of years. Algernon Charles Swinburne based his poem "Les Casquets" on the Houguez family who actually lived on the islands for 18 years. The Houguez family came from Alderney, and the evidence points to its members being Auregnais speakers; in fact, the daughter married a man from Alderney. During this time, they were isolated and would have had few visitors, but would have spoken Auregnais most of the time.

== Sources ==
- Jones, Mari C. (2015). "Auregnais: Insular Norman's Invisible Relative". Transactions of the Philological Society. 113 (3): 349–362. doi:10.1111/1467-968X.12060.
- Le Maistre, F. (1982), The Language of Auregny (cassette with accompanying 19-page booklet), St Helier, Jersey and St Anne, Alderney.
