= Grande Amfroque =

- Interactive map of Grande Amfroque

Geography
- Location: English Channel
- Type: Islet
- Archipelago: Channel Islands
- Adjacent to: Herm; Guernsey

Grande Amfroque (ɡrɒnd æmˈfroʊk / grond am-FROHK) is an uninhabited islet in the Bailwick of Guernsey. It is 4 km north-east of Herm and is marked by a navigational beacon.

== Etymology ==
Grande is a standard French and Guernésiais term meaning large or tall.

The second element Amfroque is of more uncertain origin and is believed to be a localized corruption of older maritime terms. It may derive from the Norman French word rocque or oque meaning rock which is common in Channel Island toponymy (e.g. Grandes Rocques). There may also be Old Norse influence, potentially from the elements af (meaning off or away) and rok (meaning breaking wave). This would describe a rock where the sea foams.

== History ==
On 5 June 1873 the paddle steamer Waverley struck the nearby Platte Boue reef while travelling from Weymouth to Guernsey in fog. Captain Robert Mabb evacuated all 70 passengers and crew to Grande Amfroque. Small boats from Herm provided assistance and the steamer Brittany arrived to transport the survivors to St Peter Port.
