= Sercquiais =

Norman dialect of the Channel Island of Sark

- Sarkese, Sark-French
- Sercquiais, Sèrtchais, Sérčê
- Native to: Sark
- Native speakers: 2 (2026)
- Language family: Indo-European: Italic; Latino-Faliscan; Latinic; Romance; Italo-Western; Western; Gallo-Iberian?; Gallo-Romance; Oïl; Frankish zone; Northern Norman; Anglo-Norman; Jèrriais; Sercquiais
- Early forms: Old Latin: Vulgar Latin; Proto-Romance; Old Gallo-Romance; Old French; Old Norman; Jèrriais
- Writing system: Latin

Language codes
- ISO 639-3: –
- Glottolog: None
- IETF: nrf-CQ

Sercquiais (French pronunciation: [sɛʁkjɛ]), also known as Sèrtchais, Sérčê, Sarkese or Sark-French, is the Norman dialect of the Channel Island of Sark (Bailiwick of Guernsey).

Sercquiais is a descendant of the 16th century Jèrriais used by the original colonists; 40 families, mostly from Saint Ouen, Jersey, who settled the then uninhabited island, although influenced in the interim by Guernésiais (the dialect of Guernsey). It is also closely related to the now-extinct Auregnais (Alderney) dialect, as well as to Continental Norman. It is still spoken by older inhabitants of the island and most of the local placenames are in Sercquiais.

In former times, there may have been two subdialects of Sercquiais, but today the dialect is relatively homogeneous. The phonology of the language retains features lost in Jèrriais since the 16th century.

== Written Sercquiais ==
Relatively little Sercquiais has been transcribed, and as there is no widely accepted form, it has received a certain amount of stigma as a result. A notable ruler of Sark, Sibyl Hathaway, who was a speaker herself, proclaimed that it could "never be written down", and this perception has continued in the years since.

The earliest published text in Sercquiais so far identified is the Parable of the Sower (Parabol du smeaux) from the Gospel of Matthew. Prince Louis Lucien Bonaparte, linguist, visited the Channel Islands in September 1862 in order to transcribe samples of the insular language varieties, which he subsequently published in 1863:

(3) [...] L'chen qui sème s'n allit s'mai;
(4) Et tàndis qu' i s'maitt une partie d' la s'menche quitt le long du ch'mìnn et l's oesiaux du ciel vìndrint et i la màndgirent.
(5) Une aûtre quitt dans d's endréts roquieurs, où alle n'avait pas fort de terre; et ou l'vist ossivite, parçe que la terre où al' 'tait n'était pas ben avant.
(6) Mais l'solé se l'vitt et ou fut brulaie; et coumme ou n'avait pas d'rachinnes, ou s'quitt.
(7) Une aûtre quitt dans d's épinnes, et l's épinnes vìndrent à craitre, et l'etoupidrent.
(8) Une aûtre enfin quitt dans d'bouanne terre, et ou portit du fritt; quiq' grâins rèndirent chent pour un, d'aûtres sessànte, et d'aûtres trente.
(9) L'chen qu'a d's oureilles pour ouit qu' il ouêt. (S. Makyu. Chap. XIII. 3–9)

Which in the NIV is translated as:

(3) "[...] A farmer went out to sow his seed.
(4) As he was scattering the seed, some fell along the path, and the birds came and ate it up.
(5) Some fell on rocky places, where it did not have much soil. It sprang up quickly, because the soil was shallow.
(6) But when the sun came up, the plants were scorched, and they withered because they had no root.
(7) Other seed fell among thorns, which grew up and choked the plants.
(8) Still other seed fell on good soil, where it produced a crop — a hundred, sixty or thirty times what was sown.
(9) He who has ears, let him hear."

== Present ==
As of 2022, Sercquiais had three native speakers. The Czech linguist Martin Neudörfl has been trying to preserve the language by teaching it to children. He has also conducted many tests, and created hundreds of hours of recordings, so that audio of pronunciation and rhythm — how the language sounds — is preserved. Since 2019, the language has been taught in schools.

== Phonology ==
Sercquiais Consonants
		Labial	Alveolar	Post- alveolar	Palatal	Velar/ uvular
Nasal		m	n		ɲ	
Plosive	voiceless	p	t		kʲ	k
Plosive	voiced	b	d		ɡʲ	ɡ
Fricative	voiceless	f	s	ʃ		
Fricative	voiced	v	z	ʒ		ʁ
Rhotic			r			
Lateral			l		ʎ	
Approximant	plain				j	
Approximant	labial				ɥ	w

Sercquiais Oral Vowels
	Front		Back
	unrounded	rounded	Back
Close	i iː	y yː	u uː
Open-mid	ɛ ɛː	œ œː	ɔ ɔː
Open	a aː		
Diphthong	iə		

Nasal Vowels
	Front		Back
	unrounded	rounded	Back
Close-mid	ẽ ẽː	ø̃ ø̃ː	õ õː
Open-mid	ɛ̃ ɛ̃ː		
Open			ɑ̃ ɑ̃ː

(Note: Sercquiais not possessing a standard orthography, examples are given according to Liddicoat's Lexicon of Sark Norman French, Munich 2001)

Sercquiais does not have the voiced dental fricative which is such a distinctive characteristic of St. Ouen in Jersey where most of the colonists came from.

Sercquiais	Jèrriais	English	French
lyer	liéthe	to read	lire
kuoradj	couothage	courage	courage
fere	féther	to iron	repasser (ferrer: to clad in iron)

Palatalisation of velars /k/ and /ɡ/ (see Joret line) is less fully developed in Sercquiais than in Jèrriais. Palatalisation in Jèrriais of /k/ to [tʃ] and /ɡ/ to [dʒ] has the equivalent in Sercquiais of /kj/ and /ɡj/. For example, hiccup is hitchet in Jèrriais and hekyet in Sercquiais; war is respectively dgèrre and gyer.

Palatalisation of /tj/ in Jèrriais leads to [tʃ], but in Sercquiais /t/ is generally retained: profession, trade in Sercquiais is meeti, whereas Jèrriais has palatalised to mêtchi.

[dʒ] is retained in Sercquiais where Jèrriais has reduced to [ʒ], as in to eat: mãdji (Sercquiais) – mangi (Jèrriais).

Final consonants of masculine nouns in the singular are in free variation with null in all positions except in liaison. Final consonants are usually pronounced at ends of phrases. Final consonants are always lost in plural forms of masculine nouns. A cat may therefore be kat or ka in Sercquiais, but cats are kaa. For comparison, Jèrriais cat is usually pronounced /ka/, and the plural has the long vowel as in Sercquiais. It can also therefore be seen that length is phonemic and may denote plurality.

Sercquiais has also retained final consonants that have been entirely lost in Jèrriais, such as final /t/ in pret (meadow – pré in Jèrriais as in French).

Metathesis of /r/ is uncommon in Sercquiais, and in Jèrriais, by comparison with Guernésiais.

Sercquiais	Jèrriais	Guernésiais	English
krwee	crouaix	kérouaïe	cross
mekrëdi	Mêcrédi	méquerdi	Wednesday

The palatalised l, which in Jèrriais has been generally palatalised to /j/ in initial position and following a consonant, is maintained in Sercquiais.

Sercquiais	Jèrriais (li representing /j/)	English
blyakyĩ	bliatchîn	shoe polish (blacking)
klyüt	cliu	patch
plyechi	pliaichi	to place
lyef	lief	roof

Gemination occurs regularly in verb conjugations and gerunds, as in Jèrriais but in distinction to Guernésiais.

Sercquiais	Jèrriais	Guernésiais	English
machunnii	machonn'nie	machounn'rie	masonry
dje dmãdde	jé d'mand'dai	je d'mànd'rai	I'll ask

However, Sercquiais does not geminate palatal fricatives, unlike Jèrriais:

Sercquiais	Jèrriais	English
brachii	brach'chie	brewery
brachii	brachie	armful
mãdji	mangi	to eat
mãdji	mang'gie	eating

In the second half of the 19th century the language changed considerably. We can observe this in the 40 idiolects that can be heard today. An important part of the language is the usage of diphthongs, which affects the pronunciation. It is unclear how words are pronounced because there are many possible ways to pronounce them depending on where they are in the phrase. It is important to codify the language since not even the native speakers follow all the rules.

== Conjugation of verbs ==
The St. Ouennais origins of Sercquiais can be seen in the 2nd and 3rd person plural forms of the preterite. Sercquiais uses an ending -dr which is typical of the St. Ouennais dialect of Jèrriais, but generally not used elsewhere in Jersey (nor nowadays by younger speakers in St. Ouen).

Sercquiais	Jèrriais (St. Ouennais)	standard Jèrriais	English
i vuliidr	i' voulîdrent	i' voulîtent	they wanted
uu paaliidr	ou pâlîdres	ou pâlîtes	you spoke
i füüdr	i' fûdrent	i' fûtent	they were
uu prẽẽdr	ou prîndres	ou prîntes	you took

== See also ==
- Norman language
