= Les Casquets =

Small group of rocks

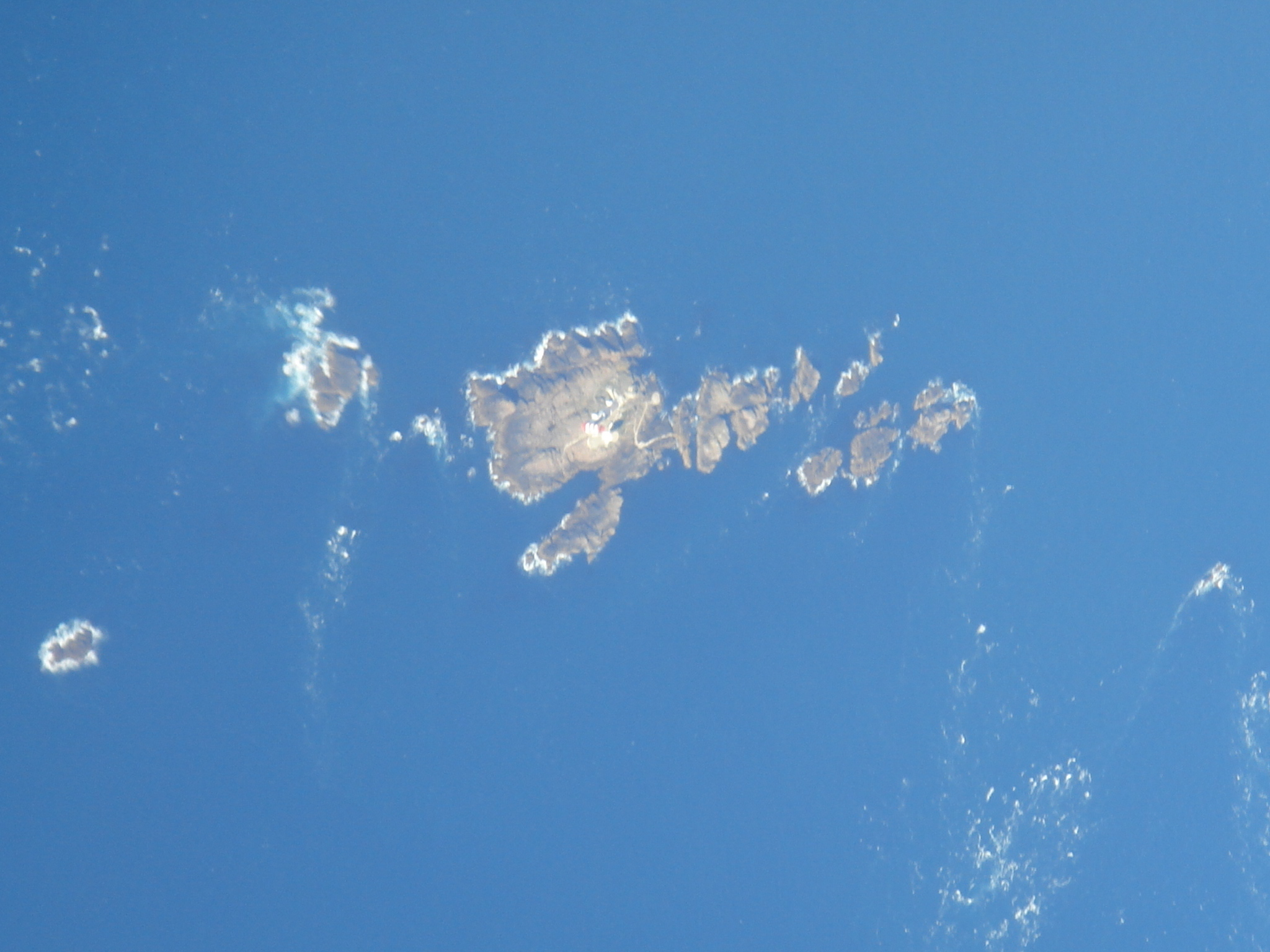
- Aerial view of Les Casquets
- Interactive map of Les Casquets

Geography
- Location: English Channel, northwest of Alderney
- Coordinates: 49°43′19″N 2°22′37″W

Administration
- Bailiwick of Guernsey

Demographics
- Population: 0 (2007)

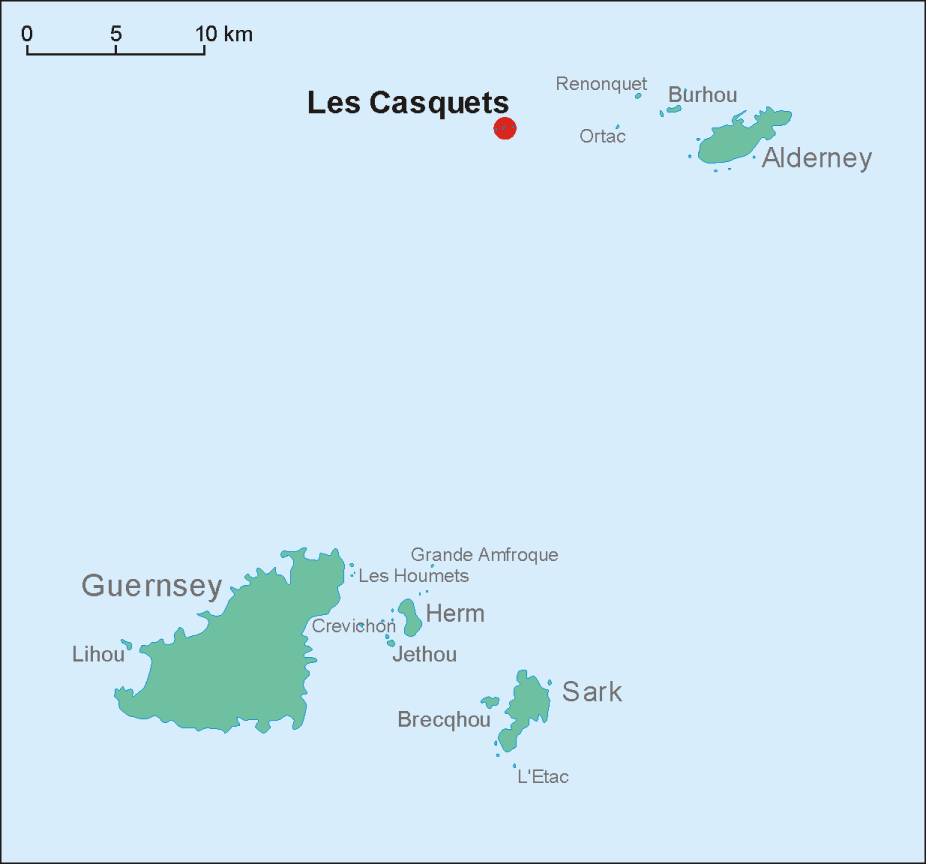
Location map of Les Casquets

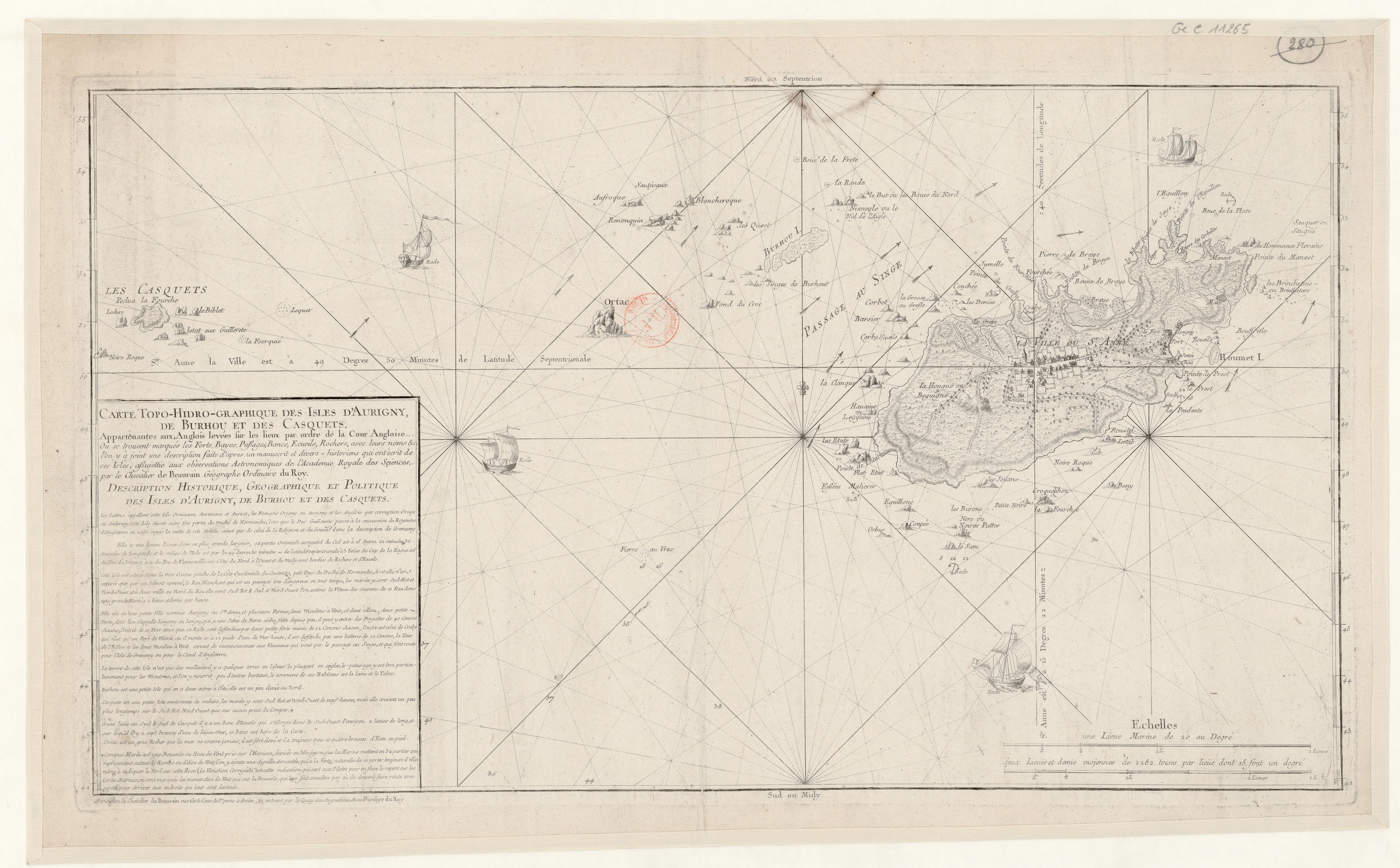
18th century Alderney map, showing details of Les Casquets in the west

Les Casquets or (The) Casquets (/kæsˈkɛts/ kas-KETS) is a group of rocks eight miles (13 km) northwest of Alderney in the Channel Islands; they are administered by the Bailiwick of Guernsey. The rocks are part of an underwater sandstone ridge. Other parts which emerge above the water are the islets of Burhou and Ortac. Little vegetation grows on them.

== Origin of name ==
A map (Leyland map) dated from around 1640 mention the name in a Latinized form Casus Rupes (Classical Latin rūpēs "rock" as opposed to Vulgar Latin rocca > rock).

Reefs between Les Casquets and Alderney bear the names Renonquet and Sauquet, featuring the same final element, -quet, in the singular.

Linguist René Lepelley, followed by Elisabeth Ridel, has identified this element -quet (also appearing independently as équet) — in toponyms along the coasts of the Channel Islands and the Cotentin (Normandy) that refers to rocks or reefs; examples include Bréquet, Gréniquet, Vitéquet, etc.; with the masculine plural definite article: Les Carniquets, Les Huquets, Les Tataquets, etc. and as standalone names: L'Équet du Nord (Écrehou), Le long Échet (Jersey), etc. This element represents a French adaptation (regular epenthesis of e- in sc-, st-, etc. clusters ; ex : Latin scola > Old French escole > French école) of the Old Scandinavian word sker "reef" — a term that persists across various Scandinavian languages (such as Icelandic sker and Danish skaer, etc.) and is also found in Great Britain, appearing as skerri in the Norn language of the Shetlands, scar or sker in Manx, and sgeir in Scottish Gaelic. There are several toponyms containing this word in the British Isles, including Wales (Green Scar - same as Gréniquet - etc.). The Jersey form palatalizes the [k] > [tʃ], hence êtché. This word was translated into Latin as Rupes, which validates this hypothesis. The first element appearing in compounds ending in -quet is interpreted by various authors as being of Scandinavian origin, for example: Bréquet, with breiðr "wide, large" — equivalent to Breiðsker in Iceland (often alternatively spelled Breiðasker or locally called Bressker); Gréniquet, with grön "green" — like Grönskär in Sweden; or Vitéquet, with hvitr "white", etc.

There are two other theories :

- derivation from the French cascade, which alludes to the tidal surges which flow around them. The French word is first attested in 1640 (Oudin, Recherches italiennes et françaises, s.v. cascata), and subsequently in 1648 with the meaning of "fall, tumble" (Scarron, Virgile, V-205b, as cited in Richardson). It is a loanword from the Italian cascata —denoting a "rockfall" or "lava flow" in the 15th century, and a "waterfall" in the 16th century (according to Battaglia);
- derivation from casque, referring to the helmet-like shape of the rocks. The French word does not appear before the 16th century, and it is a borrowing from Spanish casco;

== History ==
=== Wrecks ===
There have been numerous wrecks on the islets, many of them accounted for by fierce tides reaching 6–7 knots on springs, and a lack of landmarks in the area. The most famous wreck includes SS Stella, wrecked in 1899, with a loss of 105 lives. The largest wreck was the 8000-tonne water tanker Constantia S, lost in 1967. It was believed for centuries that the loss of HMS Victory in 1744 was attributable to wrecking on the Casquets, the lightkeeper of Alderney even being court-martialled for failure to keep the light on at the time of the ship's loss. However, when the wreck of that ship was found in 2008, it was over 60 nautical miles (110 km) from the Casquets.

=== World War II ===
The island was the location of a daring raid by a British commando unit on 2 September 1942. The raid was led by Major Gus March-Phillipps and was one of the first raids by Anders Lassen. In the raid the entire garrison of seven was captured and returned to England as prisoners and the radio and lighthouse wrecked.

== In literature ==
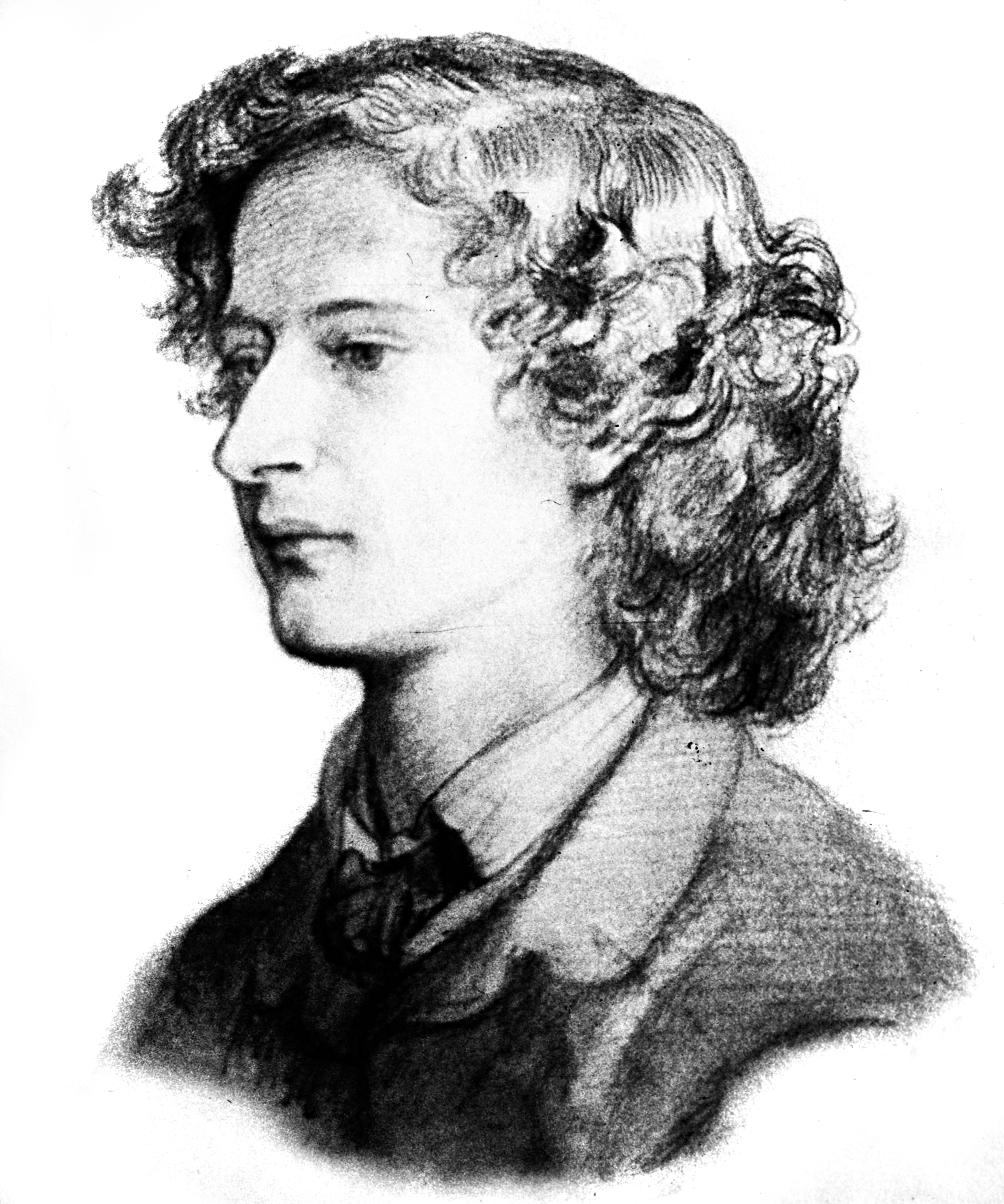
A.C. Swinburne

=== Swinburne's Les Casquets ===
A. C. Swinburne's poem Les Casquets is based on the Houguez family who actually lived on the island for 18 years. The Houguez were originally from Alderney, and the poem describes their life on Les Casquets. The daughter falls in love with a carpenter from Alderney but, moving to his island, finds life there too busy. She finds the "small bright streets of serene St Anne" and "the sight of the works of men" too much, and returns to Les Casquets.

=== Victor Hugo's L'Homme qui Rit ===
Victor Hugo, who lived on Guernsey, and who wrote much about the Channel Islands, says in his novel The Laughing Man (L'Homme qui Rit), published in 1869:

To be wrecked on the Casquets is to be cut into ribbons; to strike on the Ortac is to be crushed into powder... On a straight frontage, such of that of the Ortac, neither the wave nor the cannon ball can ricochet... if the wave carries the vessel on the rock she breaks on it, and is lost...

=== C. S. Forester's Hornblower and the Hotspur ===
In this tenth published, but third chronologically, of C. S. Forester's Horatio Hornblower series of novels, the titular hero of Hornblower and the Hotspur (published in 1962) is sent to reconnoitre the port of Brest in anticipation of war with France. The Casquets are mentioned as an area that should be negotiated carefully on the way there.

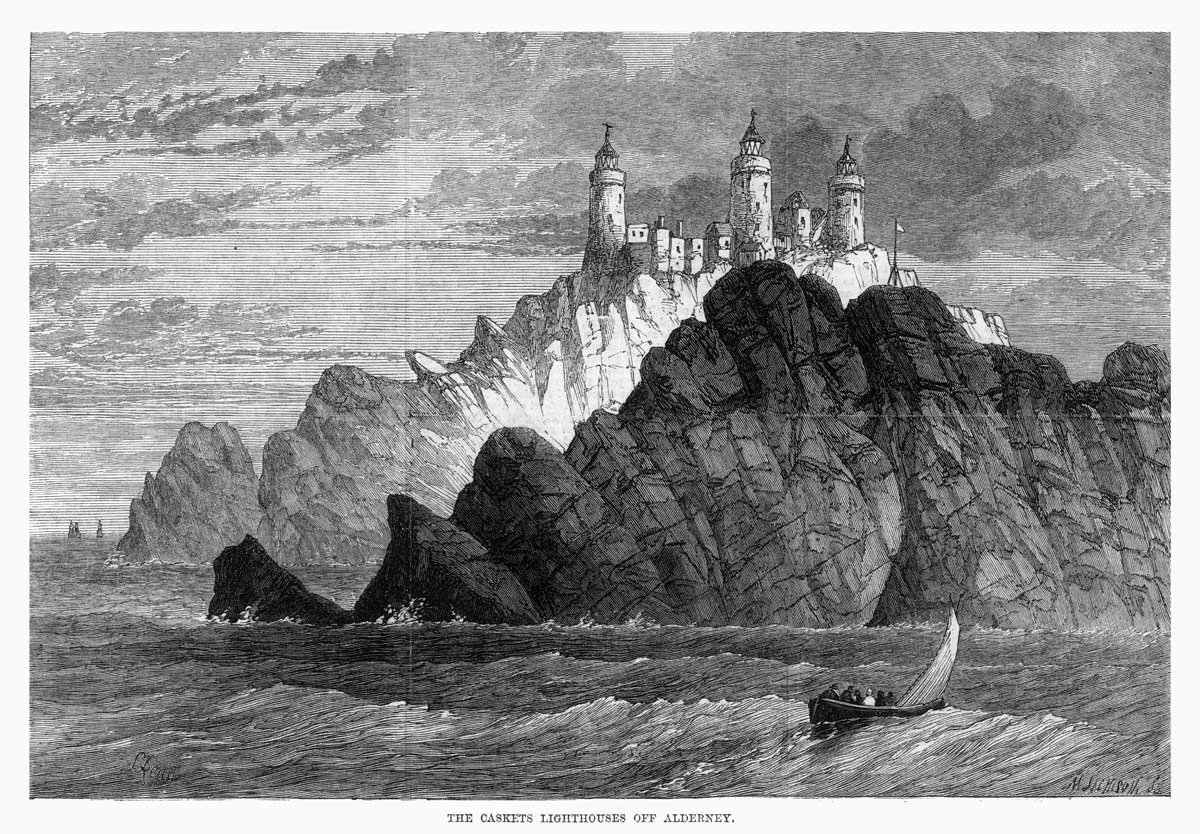
Les Casquets with lighthouses in 1868

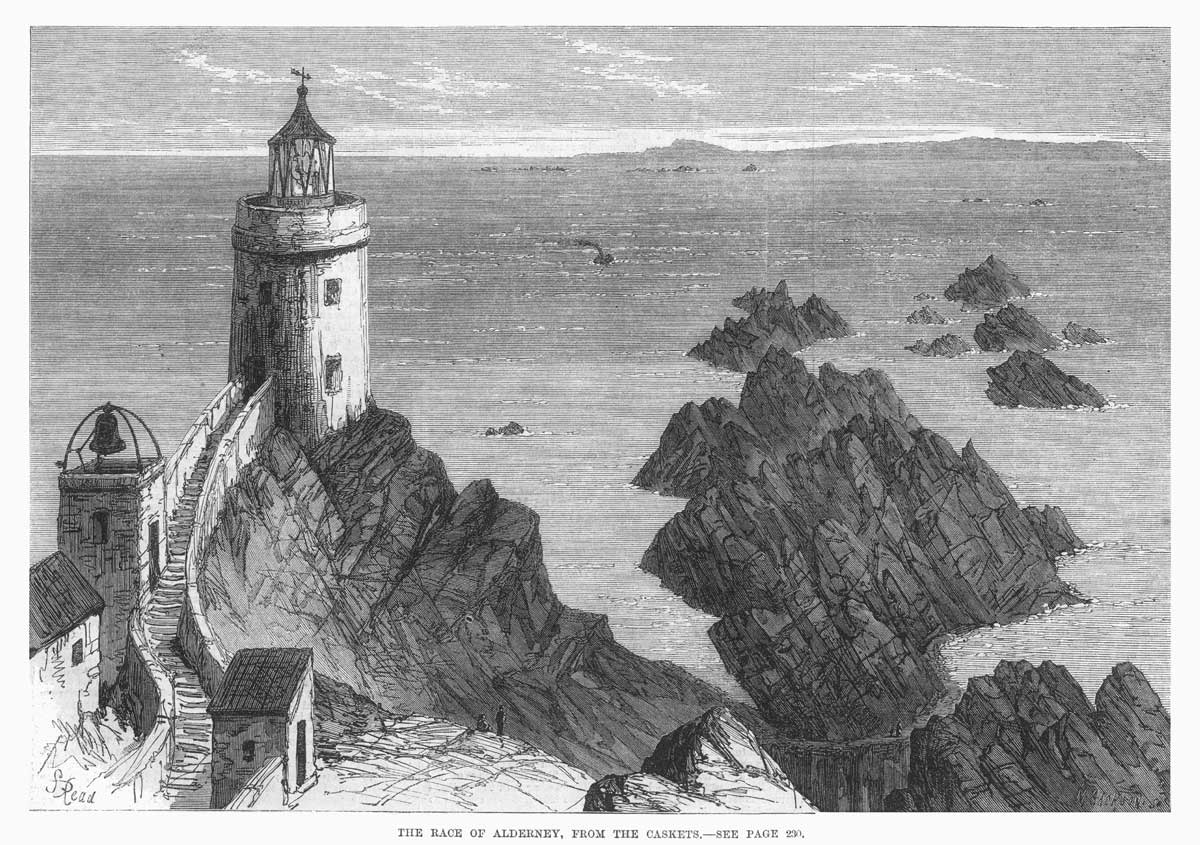
Les Casquets looking east (towards Alderney)

== See also ==
- Casquets lighthouses
