= -hou =

Norman suffix

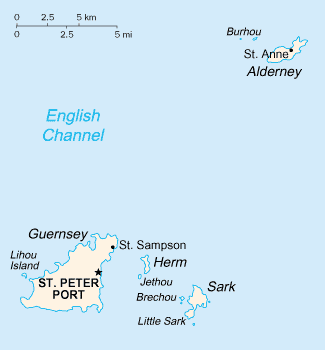
This is a map of the Bailiwick of Guernsey

-hou or hou is a place-name element found commonly in the Norman toponymy of the Channel Islands and continental Normandy.

== Etymology and signification ==
Its etymology and meaning are disputed, but most specialists think it comes from Saxon or Anglo-Saxon hōh "heel", sometimes hō, then "heel-shaped promontory", "rocky steep slope", "steep shore". This toponymic appellative appears as a final -hou or associated with the Romance definite article le Hou. It can be found everywhere in Normandy, but more in the western part of it.

The English toponymy uses this Saxon or Anglo-Saxon element the same way, but its result is phonetically -hoo or -hoe, sometimes -(h)ow or -ho e. g. : Northoo (Suffolk); Poddinghoo (Worcestershire); Millhoo (Essex); Fingringhoe (Essex); Rainow (Cheshire); Soho (London); etc. As an independent element it is Hoe, Hoo, Hooe, Ho or the Hoe, e.g. the Hoe at Plymouth (Dorset) above the harbour.

In Normandy, it may have sometimes mixed up with Old Norse hólmr, meaning a small island, and often found anglicised elsewhere as "holm". It can still be found in modern Scandinavian languages, e.g. Stockholm. The normal evolution of hólmr in Normandy is -homme, -houme, even -onne at the end of a toponym and le Homme, le Houlme, le Hom with the article. The Norman toponym and diminutive hommet / houmet also derives from this element.

In Parisian French, the equivalent is îlot, which is cognate with the English "islet".

== Channel Islands ==
=== Bailiwick of Guernsey ===
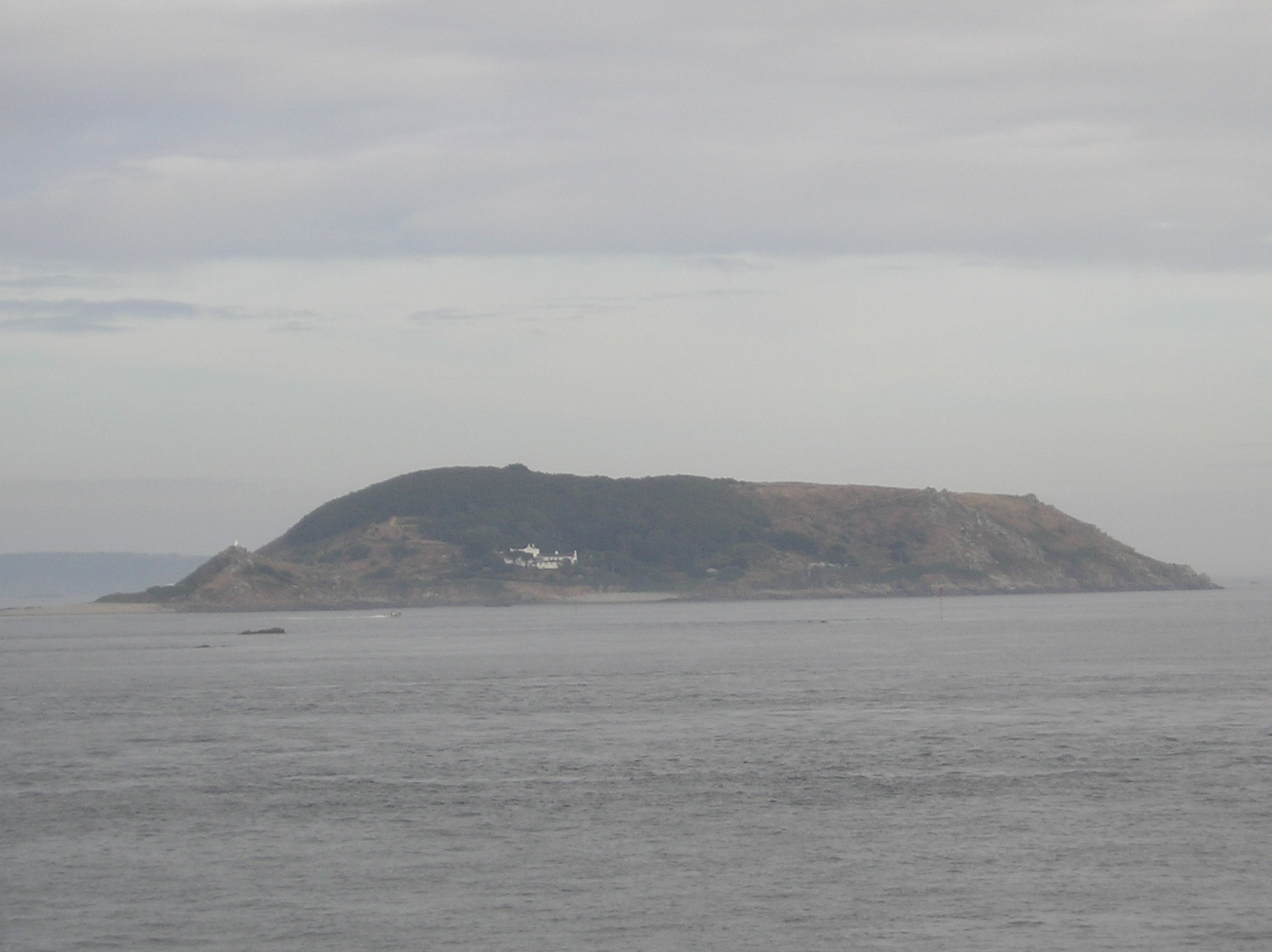
Jethou

- Off Guernsey
  - Lihou
- Off Alderney
  - Burhou
- Off Herm
  - Jethou
- Off Sark
  - Brecqhou

=== Bailiwick of Jersey ===
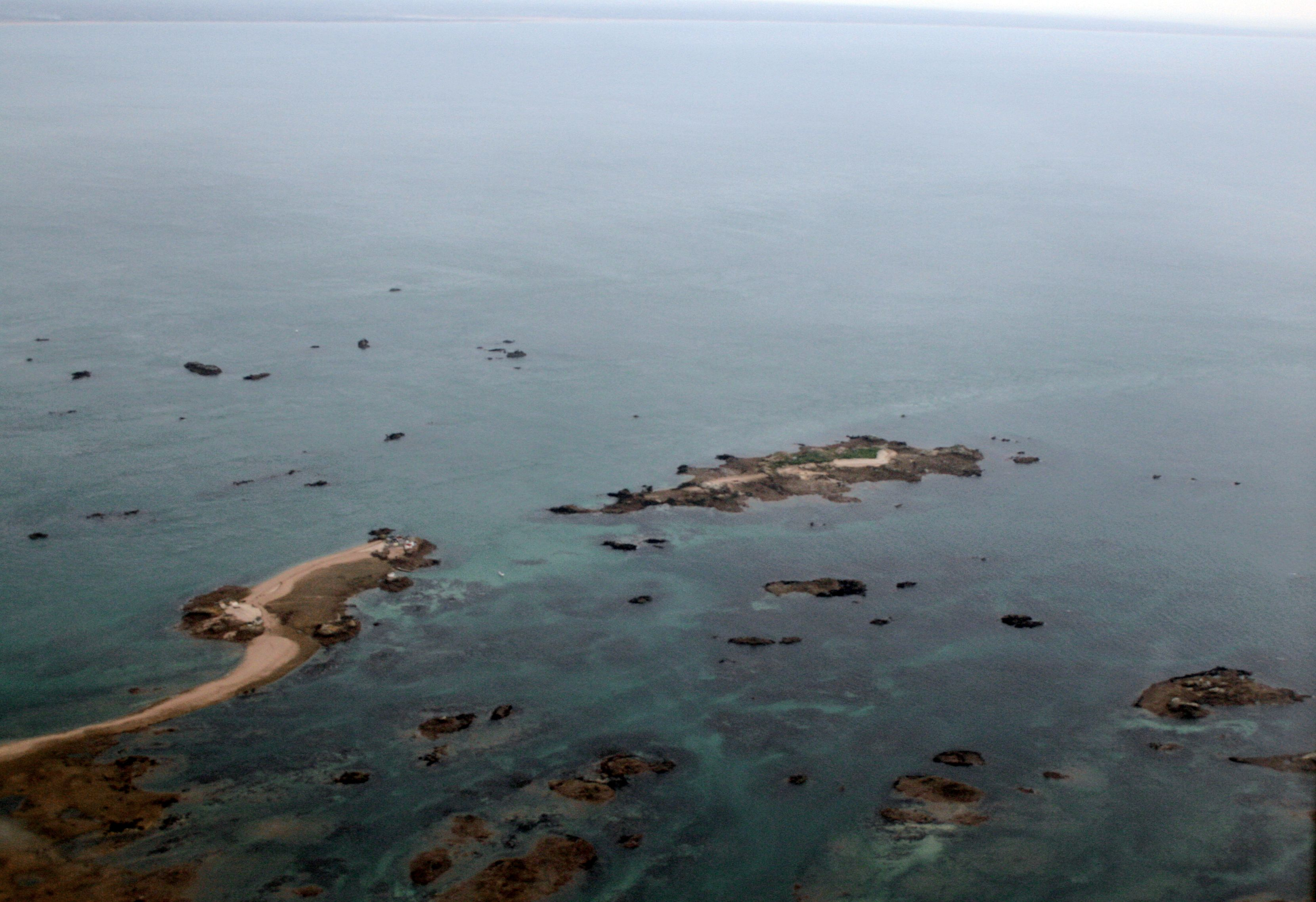
Aerial view of Les Écréhous

- Les Écréhous
- La Rocco (from rocque-hou)
- Icho (from ic-hou)

== Continental Normandy ==
=== -hou ===
- Manche
  - Bléhou, hamlet at Sainteny.
  - Bunehou, hamlet and manor at Saint-Germain-le-Gaillard.
  - Ingrehou, hamlet at Saint-Sauveur-de-Pierrepont.
  - Cap Lihou, à Granville
  - Néhou, hamlet at Auvers.
  - Nehou, hamlet at Gatteville-le-Phare.
  - Primehou, hamlet at Nay.
  - Tatihou
  - Quettehou
  - Néhou
  - Tribehou
- Eure
  - Quatre-houx (Catehou 1174, Cathoux without date), hamlet at le Noyer-en-Ouche
- Seine-Maritime
  - Le Conihout (Conihou end of the 12th century), hamlet at le Mesnil-sous-Jumièges

=== Variant form Ho- / Hau- ===
- Hotot
- Hautot

See Huttoft, England
