= Burhou =

Island near Alderney, Channel Islands

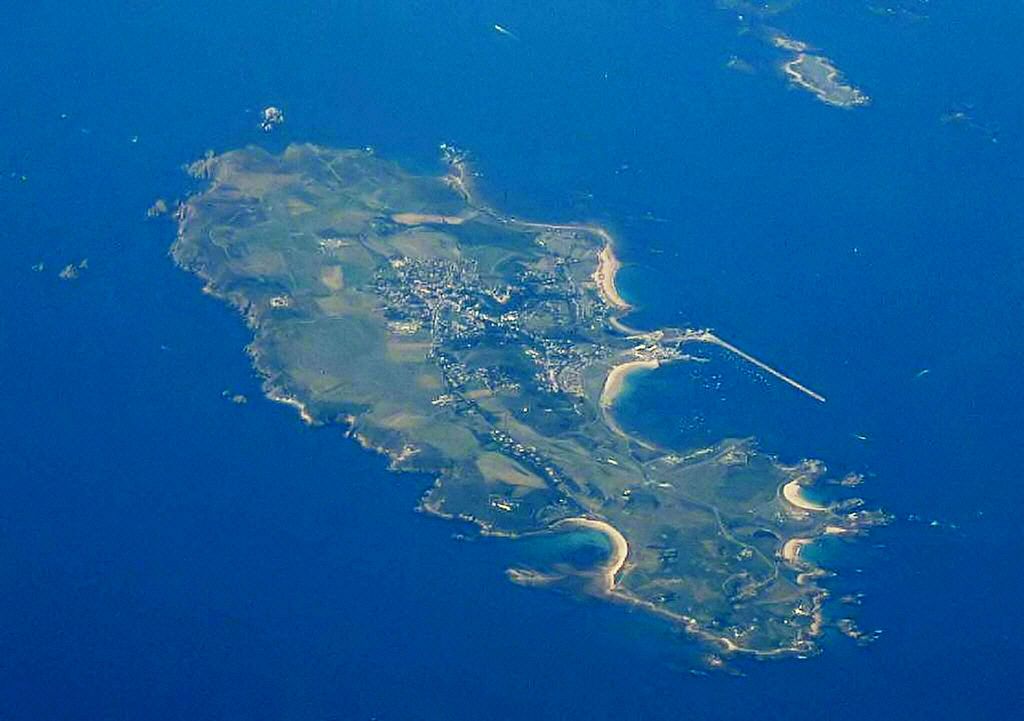
- Aerial shot of Alderney (centre) and Burhou (upper right), the Swinge lies between them

- Location within Channel Islands Location within British Isles

Geography
- Location: English Channel
- Coordinates: 49°43′48″N 2°15′06″W

Administration
- Bailiwick of Guernsey

Demographics
- Population: 0

Ramsar Wetland
- Official name: Alderney West Coast and the Burhou Islands
- Designated: 24 August 2005
- Reference no.: 1587

Burhou (pronounced ber-ROO) is a small island about 1.4 miles (2.3 km) northwest of Alderney that is part of the Channel Islands. It has no permanent residents, and is a bird sanctuary, so landing there is banned from March 15 to August 1. The island's wildlife includes a colony of puffins (declining in numbers) and many rabbits. The island has no landing stage as such, but visitors use a small inlet. In rough weather it may be impossible to land.

The Guernsey botanist E. D. Marquand called it, "the most desolate and lonely of all the islands in our archipelago." He once had to spend the night there, as his return journey was delayed by fog.

The 1906 book, The Channel Pilot states –

Between Ortac, Verte Tête and Burhou Island, are scattered many dangerous rocks, and ledges among which the streams run with great velocity.

== History ==
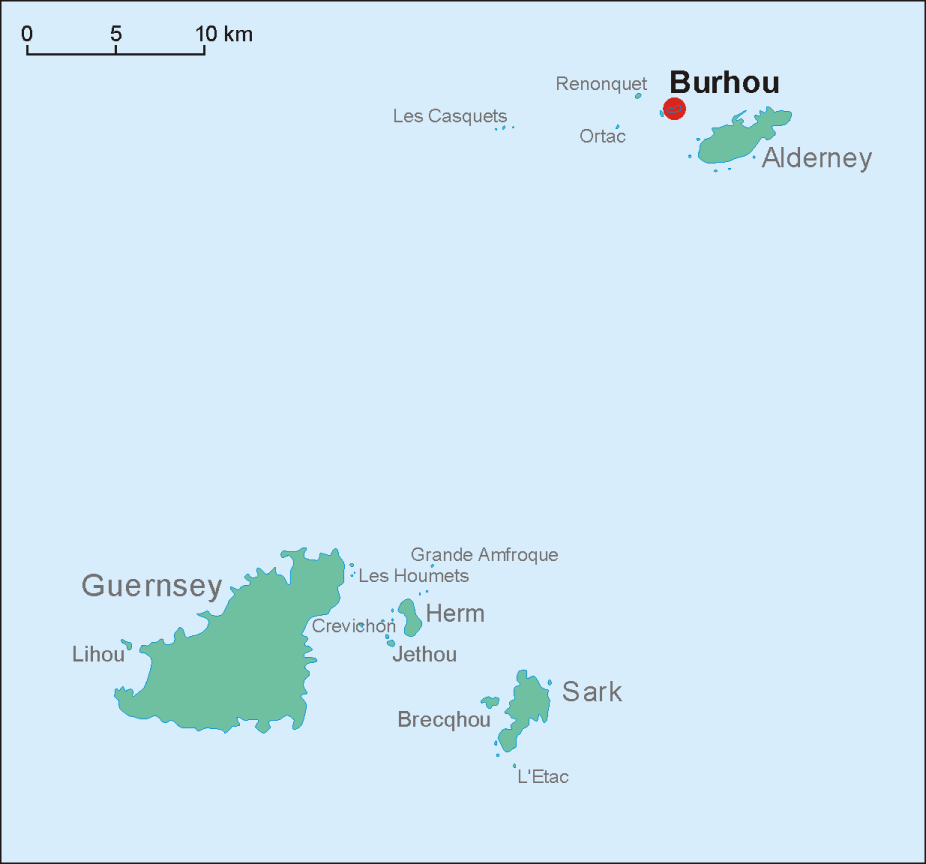
Burhou is north west of Alderney

=== Prehistory ===
Despite being isolated, and inhabited briefly and infrequently, Burhou has a long history. Formerly, like the rest of the English Channel, it would have been linked to both modern-day England and France by dry land many thousands of years ago.

Burhou, like many other Channel Islands (e.g. Lihou, Jethou), has the Norman suffix -hou, meaning a small island, from the Old Norse holmr. According to Dr. S.K. Kellet-Smith, "bur" refers to a storehouse – "Burhou is just the place where a fisherman would place a depository for his gear".

However, signs of human occupation/visitation are much older. Flint flakes have been found on the island, and one is currently in the Alderney Museum. In 1847, F. C. Lukis found two standing stones, but these have since been lost, according to the archaeologist David Johnston.

=== The hut ===
According to the Assize Roll of the 14th century, Burhou was a rabbit warren, and a refuge for fishermen. As Victor Coysh deduces, this would have meant that there would have been some kind of shelter there, as it would be difficult for the fishermen to take refuge without it.

A hut was built on the island in 1820 as a shelter for fishermen and sailors at the instigation of John Le Mesurier (hereditary governor of Alderney), but was destroyed during the German occupation of the Channel Islands (the Wehrmacht used it for target practice during WWII). The hut was replaced in 1953, with basic accommodation which is rented out to visitors by Alderney Harbour Office.

Attempts have been periodically made to raise sheep there. In 1900, a French couple lived there for a year. The soil is thin, and spray frequently goes right over the island, ensuring high soil salinity. The island has no fresh water supply for much of the year, and has to rely on shipments, or formerly tanks.

== Flora and fauna ==
The island's animals are mainly birds, although rabbits are long established here. The island has many puffins and some storm petrels. Although the latter have declined, they used to nest in the cottage's storm loft. Roderick Dobson in Birds of the Channel Islands said that puffins had been plentiful for over a century. The Birds of Guernsey (1878) by Cecil Smith states likewise. The puffins have had to compete with gulls, and in 1949, hundreds died from red mite infestation. The rabbit holes on the island make good nesting for them.

Amongst the plants noted here are sea spurry, forget-me-nots, scarlet pimpernel, field bugloss, bracken and nettles. E. D. Marquand noted a mere 18 species of plant here in 1909, but by the late twentieth century, Frances Le Sueur and David McClintock found 45, which they wrote up in the Transactions of La Société Guernesiaise.

== In popular culture ==
- Oscar Puffin, the mascot of ITV Channel Television, is said to be hatched from Burhou.

== See also ==
- List of Ramsar wetlands of international importance
- Operation Branford
