= List of shipwrecks in the Channel Islands =

Channel Islands Îles de la Manche (French) Îles d'la Manche (Norman)
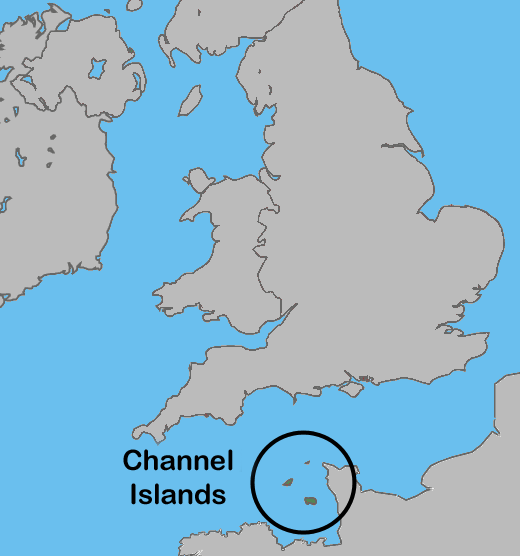
- Location of the Channel Islands

Geography
- Location: Western Europe
- Adjacent to: English Channel
- Total islands: 8 inhabited

Administration
- Bailiwick of Guernsey
- Bailiwick of Jersey

The list of shipwrecks in the Channel Islands lists some of the ships that wrecked on or sank in the waters of the Bailiwick of Guernsey and the Bailiwick of Jersey. The list includes ships that sustained a damaged hull, which were later refloated and repaired.

There are at least 700 identified shipwrecks and another 100 unidentified, in Bailiwick of Guernsey waters alone.

Jersey experiences some of the largest tidal ranges in the world, up to 12 metres; Guernsey has slightly less dramatic tides. The mass of water moving in and out gives rise to fast moving currents. Alderney has the Alderney Race, which can run up to about twelve knots during equinoctial tides. These combined with the numerous smaller islands, offshore reefs, and isolated rocks extending up to 13 miles (21 km) from the main islands, as well as the Islands' location close to the English Channel shipping channels, has resulted in thousands of shipwrecks over the centuries.

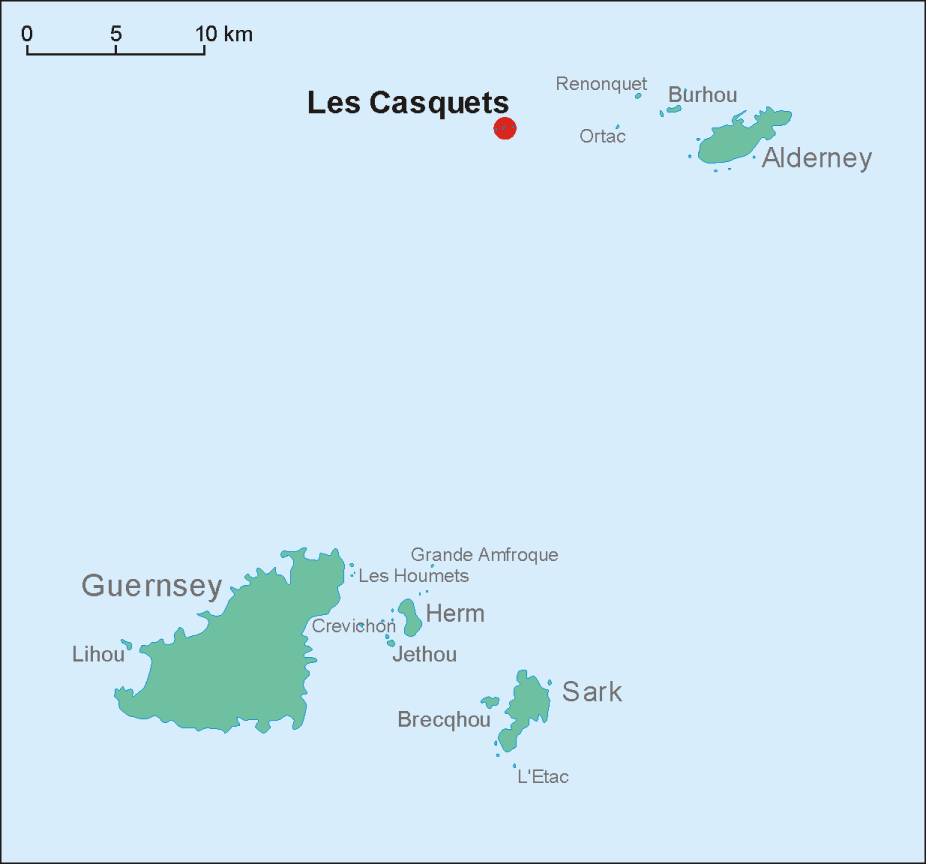
Location map of Les Casquets

The Bailiwick of Guernsey comprises the islands of Guernsey, Alderney, Sark, Herm and a number of smaller islands, islets and rocks. See List of islands of the Bailiwick of Guernsey for a complete list of their smaller islands.

Les Casquets or (The) Casquets (/kæsˈkɛts/ kas-KETS); is a group of rocks 13 km west of Alderney and are part of an underwater sandstone ridge. Other parts which emerge above the water are the islets of Burhou and Ortac. Little vegetation grows on them.

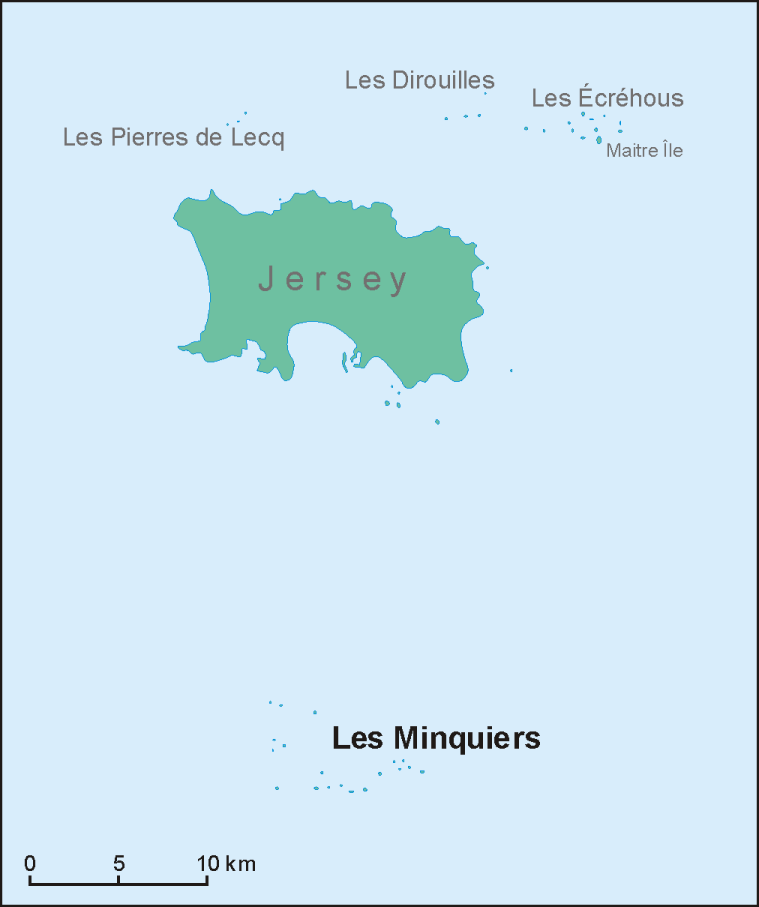

The Bailiwick of Jersey comprises the island of Jersey and a number of smaller islets and rocks, most of which are covered at high tide. See List of islands of the Bailiwick of Jersey for a complete list of their smaller islands.

Les Écréhous NE of Jersey consists of two reefs which form an extensive shoal area 7 miles (11 km) long and 2.3 miles (3.7 km) wide.

Les Minquiers 9 miles (14 km) S of Jersey, its largest island is only 50 metres by 20 metres, but at low water, Les Minquiers has a land area greater than 100km².

The deliberate wrecking of ships has not been a Channel Island trait, although the recovery of goods from a natural wreck has always been undertaken. Smuggling and Privateer's have abounded in the Islands' waters over many centuries.

Modern navigation systems have helped reduce the number of disasters, but shipping still receive warnings of waters around the Channel Islands.

== Key ==
Jersey Guernsey Alderney Other Open sea

== 12th to 18th centuries ==
Year	Ship	Flag	Location	Narrative	Coordinates						
Year	Ship	Flag	Location	Narrative	Coordinates	3rd Century	Asterix	unknown flag	Guernsey	St Peter Port harbor. It is thought to be a Roman cargo vessel and was probably at anchor or grounded when the fire broke out.	49°27′19″N 2°31′35″W
1120	White Ship	( (Normandy) ) Henry I	Les Casquets	In 1120, the White Ship, carrying Prince William, son of Henry I of England with three hundred fellow passengers: 140 knights and 18 noblewomen; his half-brother, Richard; his half-sister, Matilda the Countess of Perche; his cousins, Matilda of Blois; the nephew of the German Emperor Henry V; the young Earl of Chester and most of the heirs to the great estates of England and Normandy, was being rowed back to England by a drunken crew when it hit the Casquets rocks and sank. There was only one survivor.							
1565	John of Sandwich	Pirate	Guernsey	The ship was wrecked on the coast of Guernsey. The crew, confessing to be pirates, were imprisoned in Castle Cornet from which the commander and his officers escaped. One of the crew was hanged as an example.							
1592	Makeshift	( (England) ) Elizabeth I	Alderney	Pinnace-yacht, sank off Alderney Channel Islands. Artifacts from this wreck is featured in the Alderney Museum and is managed by the Alderney Maritime Trust.	49°44′17″N 2°09′51″W						
1666	La Vierge du Bon Port	(France)	Open Sea	The French East India Company ship was one of four sent to colonise Madagascar. She left for home on 20 February and within days of her destination of Le Havre, she was attacked by an English corsair and sank off Guernsey on 9 July 1666. At the time she was reported to be carrying a valuable cargo worth £1,500,000.							
1701	Michael	unknown flag	Les Casquets	The sailing vessel hit the Casquets rocks, several sailors managed to get ashore and sheltered in some huts. They were found just before they starved to death.							
1712	HMS Dragon	(Great Britain Royal Navy)	Les Casquets	The fourth rate frigate was escorting a convoy from Guernsey to England when it was wrecked on Les Casquets, west of Alderney, with no recorded lives lost.							
1721	Hind	( (Kingdom of Great Britain) Royal Navy):	Guernsey	20-gun sixth rate launched in 1711 and wrecked in 1721. The ship struck a rock "half a musket shot" off Castle Cornet Guernsey on 7 December 1721, and 21 hands were lost including the Captain Fuzzard. The loss was attributed to the "ignorance of the pilot". 94 of the ship's company were saved. Amongst those rescued was the ship's surgeon, Mr Forkington, "who was laid up with the gout, but made shift to swim to a rock not far distant, and the cold baths that endangered his life, hath effectively cured his said distemper." The pilot was tried and found guilty, and was sentenced to three years imprisonment and loss of pay.							
1744	HMS Victory	( (Kingdom of Great Britain) Royal Navy)	Les Casquets	The first rate ship of the line foundered between the Channel Islands and the French coast with the loss of her crew of about 900 men.	49°43′4″N 2°22′7″W)						
1747	Cerf	(France)	Minquiers	Frigate constructed and based in Saint Malo (Brittany, France). Probably privateer. Sank in the mist at the Minquiers on 25 January 1747.							
1777	HMS Sprightly	( (Kingdom of Great Britain) Royal Navy):	Guernsey	Shipwreck of new cutter of 12 guns 'Sprightly' capsized with loss of life, (Lt William Hills) off Les Hanois reef west of Guernsey Channel Islands, whilst chasing a smuggler.							
1779	Valentine	( British East India Company)	Brecqhou	The East Indiaman sailing from Shannon to London was lost off Brecqhou, Channel Islands, on 16 November 1779 in a gale.							
1795	HMS Amethyst	( (Kingdom of Great Britain) Royal Navy)	Alderney	The frigate hit the Hannouaux (Hanois) rocks off the coast of Alderney and was driven into Braye bay on 29 December 1795. The crew got ashore without loss, however two rescuers drowned.							

== 19th century ==
Year	Ship	Flag	Location	Narrative	Coordinates						
Year	Ship	Flag	Location	Narrative	Coordinates	1800	HMS Pelican	( (Kingdom of Great Britain) Royal Navy)	Jersey; St Aubin's Bay	The 18-gun Pelican was driven ashore and wrecked in St. Aubin's Bay on 9 November 1800 but later refloated.	49°11′N 2°09′W
1800	HMS Havick	( (Kingdom of Great Britain) Royal Navy)	Jersey; St Aubin's Bay	The sloop foundered on 9 November 1800, settled into the sand, could not be re-floated and became a wreck.	49°11′N 2°09′W						
1801	Denton	(United Kingdom)	Guernsey	The transport ship was wrecked on 9 February 1801.							
1801	Morning Star	(United Kingdom)	Guernsey	The ship foundered in the English Channel off Guernsey, in May 1801.							
1801	Sukey	(United States)	Jersey	wrecked at Jersey.							
1802	Hero	(United Kingdom)	Guernsey	The ship was driven ashore and wrecked at while on a voyage from Naples, Kingdom of Sicily, to Guernsey							
1802	HMS Pomone	(Royal Navy)	Jersey; St Aubin's Bay	The frigate, which had been captured from the French in 1794, struck a rock in St Aubin's Bay, Jersey and sank. On 23 September 1802. She was later refloated but was declared a constructive total loss.	49°11′N 2°09′W						
1803	HMS Determinee	(Royal Navy)	Jersey; St Aubin's Bay	The 6th rate frigate stuck broadside on to a sunken rock near Noirmont Point on the western side of Saint Aubin, Jersey Channel Islands on 26 March 1803. She immediately bilged and started taking in water. Seventeen men, women, and children from the 81st Regiment of Foot (Loyal Lincoln Volunteers) were lost.	49°11′N 2°09′W						
1803	HMS Grappler (ex GB No. 28)	(Royal Navy)	Chausey	En route from Guernsey to Granville on 23 December, the Courser-class gun-brig sought shelter off the island of Maitre, one of the Iles Chausey. The storm abated on 30 December 1803, but on leaving the anchorage a hawser parted and Grappler drifted on to a half-tide rock, breaking in two as the tide dropped.							
1804	Harry	( (United Kingdom) Guernsey)	Alderney	The ship was wrecked at Alderney							
1804	James and John	(United Kingdom)	Jersey	The ship was wrecked at Jersey.							
1804	HMS Severn	(Royal Navy)	Jersey; Grouville	The Adventure-class frigate was driven ashore and wrecked in Grouville bay, Jersey on 21 December 1804 in a gale. Her crew were rescued.							
1805	Adventure	(United Kingdom)	Jersey	Her crew were rescued. She was on a voyage from Malta to London.							
1805	Fame	(United Kingdom)	Guernsey	The privateer frigate was at anchor but was driven ashore and wrecked on Castle Rocks, Guernsey on 31 January 1805 in a storm that had also broken her mizzenmast. Her 150 crew were rescued.							
1805	HMS Pigmy	(United Kingdom)	Jersey; St Aubin's Bay	Pigmy was wrecked in St Aubin's Bay, Jersey, on 9 August 1805. The pilot, Nicholas de Leree, had thought there was enough water to pass over a reef of rocks stretching from Sillet Point, but she grounded and was bilged. Boats from HMS Alcmene, Albacore, Conquest, and Eclipse took her people off.	49°11′N 2°09′W						
1806	Neptune	(United Kingdom)	Alderney	The ship was wrecked on a voyage from Bristol, Gloucestershire, to Guernsey.							
1807	HMS Boreas	(Royal Navy)	Guernsey; Les Hanois	The 28-gun Laurel-class post ship struck rocks on Les Hanois reef SW of Guernsey and was wrecked with the loss of all but 47 of her 155 crew on 28 November 1807 when towing a pilot cutter to safety. Only two officers and 45 men were saved when Boreas went down immediately after striking the sunken rock leaving only the masts and rigging above sea level. Among those lost were Capt Robert Scott and his wife.							
1808	Active	(United Kingdom)	Guernsey	The ship was wrecked on Guernsey.							
1812	Cynthia	(United Kingdom)	Alderney	The ship was wrecked on the coast of Alderney on 23 February 1812							
1812	Mars	(United Kingdom)	Guernsey	The ship was wrecked on 9 April 1812. She was on a voyage from Guernsey to Plymouth, Devon.							
1814	Active	(United Kingdom)	Alderney	The ship was wrecked with the loss of all hands.							
1814	Pomona	(United Kingdom)	Open Sea	The ship departed Alderney, Channel Islands, for Guernsey, on 14 November 1814. No further trace, presumed foundered in the English Channel with the loss of all hands.							
1814	Arinus Marinus	( (France) French Empire)	Jersey; Gorey	The ship was driven ashore on 29 December 1814. She was on a voyage from Rotterdam to Batavia.							
1815	Leicester	(United Kingdom)	Jersey	The transport ship was driven onto a rock and was wrecked on 7 January 1815.							
1815	Bonne Annette	(France)	Open Sea	The ship foundered in the English Channel whilst on a voyage from Cherbourg, Seine-Maritime, to Guernsey, on 25 April 1815.							
1815	Fanny	(United Kingdom)	Jethou	The ship struck a rock off Jethou, Channel Islands, and foundered. She was on a voyage from Sunderland, County Durham, to Guernsey, Channel Islands.	49°27′30″N 02°28′00″W						
1816	La Balance	(France)	Jersey	The transport ship, a brig, was wrecked on the coast on 23 March 1816 with the loss of 36 of the 108 people on board. She was on a voyage from Cherbourg, Manche, to Saint-Malo, Ille-et-Vilaine.							
1816	Marie Elizabeth	(Denmark)	Guernsey	The ship was wrecked at Rocquaine, on the west coast of Guernsey on 12 November 1816. Her crew were rescued. She was on a voyage from Palermo, Spain, to Antwerp, Netherlands.							
1816	Sampson	(United Kingdom)	Guernsey	The ship was wrecked on the west coast of Guernsey on 9 December 1816 with the loss of all hands. She was on a voyage from Gibraltar to London.							
1816	St. Alexy	(Russia)	Guernsey	The ship was wrecked on the west coast of Guernsey, on 13 December 1816 with the loss of all but one of her crew. She was on a voyage from Lisbon, Portugal, to Antwerp, Netherlands.							
1817	Sapor	(United States)	Sark	The ship was driven ashore and wrecked on Sark on 15 February 1817 with the loss of all hands.							
1817	Master Mason	(United Kingdom)	Guernsey	The ship foundered off Guernsey on 4 December 1817. Her crew were rescued. She was on a voyage from Plymouth, Devon, to London.							
1817	Pleasant Hill	(United Kingdom)	Jersey	The ketch was wrecked on 17 December 1817 with the loss of one of her six crew. Survivors were rescued by Minerva (United Kingdom). She was on a voyage from Seville, Spain, to London							
1819	Nimble	(United Kingdom)	Jersey	The ship struck rocks on 14 September 1819 and sank. Her crew were rescued. She was on a voyage from Plymouth, Devon, to Jersey.							
1820	Stephaine	(France)	Pierres de Lecq	The ship was wrecked on the Paternoster Rocks, off the Channel Islands on 27 December 1820. Her crew were rescued. She was on a voyage from Rotterdam, South Holland, Netherlands, to Saint-Malo, Ille-et-Vilaine.	49°17′N 2°17′W						
1820	Rose Victoire	(France)	Guernsey	The ship foundered in the English Channel off Guernsey. Her crew were rescued.							
1821	Willem den Easten	(Netherlands)	Guernsey	The ship was wrecked on the west coast of Guernsey on 26 November 1821. Her crew were rescued. She was on a voyage from Ostend to Gibraltar.							
1821	Ales	(Russia)	Casquets	The brig ran aground on the Casquets, on 24 November 1821 and broke in two. The thirteen crew were on the stern section, which floated off and subsequently came ashore on the Isle of Wight. United Kingdom on 29 December enabling the rescue of her crew. Ales was on a voyage from London, United Kingdom, to St. Ubes, Spain.							
1821	William	(United Kingdom)	Guernsey	The ship was wrecked on Guernsey. Her crew were rescued. She was on a voyage from Ostend, Netherlands, to Gibraltar.							
1822	John and Robert	(United Kingdom)	Jersey	The ship was driven ashore and wrecked on the north coast of Jersey on 31 March 1822. She was on a voyage from New Brunswick, British North America, to Liverpool, Lancashire.							
1822	Jeune George	(France)	Casquets	The brig foundered off the Casquets on 27 October 1822. Her crew survived, She was on a voyage from Rouen, Seine-Maritime, to Normantier, Vendée.							
1823	Eliza	(France)	Guernsey	The ship was driven ashore and wrecked on the north coast of Guernsey on 3 March 1823. Her crew and a passenger were rescued.							
1823	Clio	( (United Kingdom) Guernsey)	Guernsey; St Peter Port	The ship struck rocks off St Peter Port harbour, Guernsey and sank on 19 October 1823. She was on a voyage from Rio de Janeiro, Brazil, to Livorno, Grand Duchy of Tuscany via Guernsey and Genoa, Kingdom of Sardinia.	49°27′10″N 2°31′40″W						
1823	Friendship	(United Kingdom)	Jersey	The ship was lost at Jersey on 1–4 November 1823.							
1823	Joseph and Jane	( (United Kingdom) Jersey)	Jersey	The ship was wrecked on the north coast of Jersey on 1 November 1823. Her crew were rescued. She was on a voyage from Plymouth, Devon, to Jersey.							
1823	Siren	(Sweden)	Jersey	The ship foundered off Jersey on 4 November 1823. Three survivors were rescued. She was on a voyage from St. Ubes, Spain, to Gävle, Sweden							
1824	London	(United Kingdom)	Casquets	The ship was wrecked on the Casquets, off Alderney on 17 March 1824 with the loss of all but two of her crew. She was on a voyage from Newcastle upon Tyne, Northumberland, to Guernsey, Channel Islands.							
1825	Fanny	(France)	Jersey; St Helier	The cutter was en route from Saint Malo to Jersey when an onto the rocks called Les Buts behind Elizabeth Castle on 7 January 1825. 13 passengers and crew were saved and the National Institution for the Preservation of Life from Shipwreck, which had been founded the previous year, awarded three gold medals and a silver medal in recognition of the bravery of their rescuers.	49°10′30″N 2°07′30″W						
1825	Good Intent	(United Kingdom)	Jersey	The ship was driven ashore and wrecked on Jersey on 18 October 1825. Her crew were rescued.							
1825	Mary Ann	(United Kingdom)	Guernsey	The ship was driven ashore and wrecked on Guernsey on 10 November 1825. She was on a voyage from London to Waterford							
1825	Cimoni	( (First Hellenic Republic) Hellenic Navy)	Alderney	The Brig of War was driven ashore and wrecked on the east coast of Alderney on 11 November 1825. Her 55 crew were rescued and the vessel was plundered by the local inhabitants. She was on a voyage from London, United Kingdom, to Hydra.							
1826	Hinchinbrook	(United Kingdom)	Alderney	The ship was wrecked on 2 February 1826, all on board were rescued. She was on a voyage from Weymouth, Dorset, to Guernsey.							
1826	Thetis	(United Kingdom)	Jersey	The ship struck rocks 3 nautical miles (5.6 km) on 20 July 1826 and foundered. She was on a voyage from Newcastle upon Tyne, Northumberland, to Jersey.							
1826	Josephine	(Sweden)	Jersey	The ship was blown over whilst under repairs on 11 September 1826. She was declared a total loss.							
1827	Charlotte	(United Kingdom)	Jersey	The ship was wrecked on 1 December 1827. All fourteen people on board were rescued. She was on a voyage from Jamaica to London.							
1827	Neptune	( (United Kingdom) Guernsey)	Jersey	The ship was wrecked on 8 December 1827. She was on a voyage from "Gasper" to Guernsey.							
1828	Fanny	(United Kingdom)	Jersey; St Aubin's Bay	The ship was wrecked on 1 January 1828 with the loss of at least three lives.	49°11′N 2°09′W						
1829	Crescent	(United Kingdom)	Jersey	The ship was wrecked on 6 March 1829. She was on a voyage from London to Jersey.							
1829	Milo	(United Kingdom)	Écréhous	The ship was wrecked on the Écréhous Rock, on 3 October 1829, 6 nautical miles (11 km) off Jersey, Her crew were rescued. She was on a voyage from Dublin to Memel, Prussia.							
1830	Baroness Keith	(United Kingdom)	Guernsey	The ship sprang a leak and was abandoned off Guernsey. Her crew were rescued by St. Jacque (France) She was on a voyage from Tenerife, Spain, to London.							
1831	Virginie	(France)	Jersey	The ship sprang a leak and foundered off Jersey on 10 January 1831. All on board were rescued. She was on a voyage from Granville to Jersey.							
1831	Duke of Wellington	(United Kingdom)	Jersey	The ship sank at Jersey on 12 January 1831.							
1831	Prosperous	(United Kingdom)	Guernsey	The ship was wrecked and sank on the north coast of Guernsey on 22 May 1831. Her crew were rescued. She was on a voyage from Weymouth, Dorset, to Guernsey.							
1833	Jupiter	( Hamburg)	Alderney	The ship was wrecked on North West Alderney on 3 January 1833. She was on a voyage from Hamburg to Valparaíso, Chile, and Lima, Peru. Despite soldiers trying to protect the cargo, the Islanders looted her, several were jailed.							
1833	Cyrus	(United Kingdom)	Open Sea	The ship foundered 2 leagues south of Guernsey on 1/2 September 1833. Her crew were rescued by Alfred (United Kingdom). She was on a voyage from Livorno, Kingdom of Sardinia, to London.							
1833	Louisa Barbara	(Netherlands)	Jersey	The ship struck a rock off the Channel Islands and was abandoned by her crew on 2 September 1833. She was subsequently taken in to Jersey by HMRC Sylvia ( Board of Customs). Louisa Barbara was on a voyage from Philadelphia, Pennsylvania, United States, to Amsterdam, North Holland.							
1834	George and William	(United Kingdom)	Guernsey	The ship was driven ashore and wrecked on the north coast of Guernsey on 12 January 1834 with the loss of all but two of her crew. She was on a voyage from Jamaica to London.							
1834	Sally	(United Kingdom)	Jersey	The ship struck a rock and sank at Jersey, in May 1834.							
1834	Annabella	(United Kingdom)	Jersey	The ship capsized at Jersey on 21 October 1834							
1834	Navarino	(Russia)	Alderney; Platte Saline	The oak built ship, registered in Odesa, Russia, was driven ashore and wrecked on la platte saline, Alderney on 28 October 1834. Her crew were rescued. She was in ballast. Her provisions and rigging were saved.							
1834	Buccleuch	(United Kingdom)	Guernsey	The ship struck a rock and foundered off Guernsey on 6 November 1834. Her crew were rescued. She was on a voyage from Dénia, Spain, to London.							
1834	Morpeth Castle	(United Kingdom)	Jersey; Rozel Bay	The brig was driven ashore in Rozel Bay, Jersey on 20 November 1834. She was on a voyage from Newcastle upon Tyne, Northumberland, to Jersey							
1835	Colbert	(France)	Guernsey	The sailing vessel based in Port Navalo Brittany France left Rouen for Saint Malo loaded with copper and earthenware, sank off the coast of Guernsey on 25 October 1835							
1835	Actif	(France)	Jersey; St Brelade	The ship was driven ashore in St Brelade's Bay, Jersey on 26 October 1835. She was on a voyage from Saint-Brieuc, Côtes-du-Nord to Bayonne, Pyrénées-Atlantiques.							
1848	Emmanuel	(United Kingdom)	Guernsey; Les Hanois	Sailing from Quebec to Hull, struck rocks 5 miles NW from Les Hanois, filled quickly with water but stayed afloat as it was carrying timber. No casualties.							
1848	Five Sisters	(United Kingdom)	Guernsey; Perelle Bay	A brig sailing from Lisbon to Wick with a cargo of salt, cork, wine and brandy, was lost with its crew, five bodies were recovered.							
1849	SV Oneida	(United States)	Guernsey; Perelle Bay	En route from New York City to Le Havre loaded with cotton and hops, ran aground near Guernsey on 19 December 1849. Part of the cargo was saved from the ship as were the 22 passengers and 28 crew.							
1850	Experiment	(Alderney)	Guernsey; Bréhon Tower	The Alderney cutter Experiment was wrecked off Bréhon Tower, between Guernsey and Herm in March 1850. The Captain and 8 passengers drowned but 20 were saved by the Guernsey pilot boat Mary of Guernsey.	49°28′N 2°30′W						
1850	Polka	(United Kingdom)	Minquiers	On a run from Saint Malo to Jersey as a replacement ship, the Paddle Steamer sprang a leak and began to sink near the Minquiers S of Jersey on 15 September 1850. All passengers and crew took to the lifeboats and were rescued. On 15 September 1850, the steam tug Polka was hurriedly pressed into service to make the daily run to St. Malo as Superb was undergoing repairs at St. Helier. When she was about halfway to her destination, Polka sprang a leak and began to sink whereupon her master, Captain Priaulx, calmly loaded everyone into the two lifeboats and landed them safely on the nearby Mâitre Ile. Picked up and taken into St. Malo the next day, the survivors counted themselves extremely fortunate and lavished both praise and a sizeable reward upon Captain Priaulx for his admirable seamanship.							
1850	Superb	(United Kingdom)	Minquiers	The paddle steamer was running from Saint Malo to Jersey with 60 passengers, including survivors from the Polka (United Kingdom) on approaching the Minquiers reef, they went to inspect where the PSS Polks had sunk, whereupon they themselves struck a rock, which caused panic and 20 people lost their lives, the rest being saved. On 17 September, only two days after the sinking of the PSS Polka, Superb left St. Malo with sixty passengers and crew aboard, including Captain Priaulx and several of the other survivors from the Polka. As they approached the Minquiers Reef, Superbs’ mate (John Fleming) was persuaded by some of the passengers to show them where the Polka had gone down but unfortunately, as he took Superb through the so-called eastern passage, she struck a rock known as La Pointue du Blanc Roc which tore deep into her hull. In the ensuing panic to load the lifeboats, twenty people lost their lives, four of whom had barely recovered from their experiences on the sinking Polka two days previously. Ironically, Superb herself remained stranded on the rock and the survivors including, once again, Captain Priaulx, were plucked straight off the decks by the rescue ships sent out from St. Helier. As an interesting postscript, one small vestige of Superb lived on after her boilers were salvaged and subsequently installed into one of her successors, another paddle steamer, the Rose, which took her name from Thomas Rose, the owner of the company. One of the earliest steamships operating in the waters around the Channel Islands, the Superb was owned by the Jersey Steam Packet Company of St. Helier which ran her on their scheduled Jersey to St. Malo [and Granville] mail and passenger service.							
1857	Boadicea	(United Kingdom)	Les Casquets	The barque mistook the Les Casquets west of Alderney on 5 January 1857 for the Scillies. She was driven onto Tautenay rock in the Little Russel. The brig ‘Diolinda’ raised the alarm and steam tug ‘Watt’, H.M. Revenue Cutter ‘Eagle’ and Pilot boat ‘Blonde’ between them saved 6 of 15 crew. An RNLI silver medal was awarded to William Cockrom a steward on the 'Eagle'.							
1859	Express	(United Kingdom)	Jersey; La Corbière	The South Western Steam Co mail ship sank near La Corbière Jersey on 20 September 1859.	49°10′N 2°14′W						
1862	Globe	(Jersey):	Guernsey; Les Hanois	A schooner-brig from Jersey en route to Boston in ballast returning to Jersey struck les Hanois on 6 April 1862 in appalling weather conditions, eventually sinking near L'Ancresse. The crew of seven landed from a small boat at Vazon.							
1863	Paris	(United Kingdom):	Jersey; St Helier	The paddle steamer Paris left St Malo 28 July 1863 with 24 passengers and 12 tons of cargo, chiefly butter and eggs. She was under charge of a Jersey pilot of considerable experience named De La Cour, the day was beautiful and the sea was as smooth as a mill pond. Shortly before 9am the steamer was observed just off Elizabeth Castle which, with the hermitage forms an outwork of rock a short distance from the entrance to Victoria Harbour, Jersey. The tide was just beginning to flow. the Captain (Hemmings) asked the pilot which passage he was going to take. The Sellette or the middle passage. The Pilot replied that he would take whichever passage the Captain chose to which the latter replied that it was not his province to interfere, adding that it was high time the pilot made up his mind. The Captain again warned the pilot of the danger which was now clearly apparent. This warning was scarcely off his lips when the vessel struck on a rock known as ´GRUNE VAUDIN´. The engines were stopped and set for astern. It was then the captain ordered the lifeboats to be lowered. Ten minutes after the vessel struck, she went down in 5 fathoms of water. The Paris was valued at £7000 and was not insured. The masts of the sunken vessel were clearly visible from the shore.	49°10′N 02°07′W						
1864	Jean Goujon	(France)	Écréhous	Sailing from Havanna bound for Le Havre with a cargo of sugar, in a storm, at night, the captain mistook his position and steered south of the rocks he thought were the Les Casquets. They were in fact the Écréhous and in doing so he ran onto the rocks off Jersey on 3 May 1864. The crew was saved.							
1865	Carioca	(France)	Alderney	Struck the rocks under Hermitage Rock Battery in Alderney in late December 1865. Gunner James Moore of the Royal Artillery in Alderney rescued 17 men of the crew; he was later awarded an RNLI Silver Medal.							
1866	Dinanais	(France)	Jersey; St Ouen	Sailing from Dinan (Brittany), ran aground on the coast of St Ouen, Jersey, on 22 January 1866.							
1867	Blayais	(France)	Minquiers	The brig, ran aground on the board of the Minquiers, S of Jersey on 12 January 1867. The crew escaped with life boats.							
1867	Edouard	(France):	Minquiers	The sloop was lost by hitting a rock N of Plateau des Minquiers, S of Jersey on 5 February 1867.							
1872	Assomption	(France)	Guernsey	Sloop built in Cherbourg belonging to an owner of this city, which was wrecked on the coast of Guernsey on 26 September 1872.							
1872	Gosforth	(United Kingdom)	Herm	On a voyage from Sark to Guernsey the Gosforth, carrying the Seigneur of Sark, struck a rock between Herm and Jethou and sank. All crew and passengers got ashore on Herm	49°27′40″N 02°27′30″W						
1873	Waverley	(United Kingdom)	Guernsey	Two funnels, two masts side paddle wheel propulsion and accommodation for 450–560 passengers. Used on the Southampton – Channel Islands service. On 5 June 1873 she was wrecked in fog on Platte Boue Rock, Little Roussel, between Herm and Guernsey.	49°31′17″N 02°25′13″W						
1873	Clarisse	(France):	Minquiers	The barque, based in Granville, Manche, lost in the Minquiers, on 22 November 1873, during a trip from Bordeaux (Aquitaine) to her home port. There was only one survivor.							
1875	PSS Havre	(United Kingdom)	Guernsey	The LSWR Channel Packet from Southampton, founders on Platte Boue rock on 16 February 1875, there were 92 survivors. Passengers put ashore on Amfroque; wreck found lying across that of the PSS Waverley (United Kingdom), which had hit the same rock in 1873.	49°31′17″N 02°25′13″W						
1876	Celinia	(France)	Jersey; St Helier	The lugger type ship traveling from Saint Malo to St Helier Jersey which ran aground and broke at the foot of Elizabeth Castle, near the port.	49°10′N 02°07′W						
1880	Rontegue	(France):	Guernsey	Carrying iron ore and wine, ran aground on rocks off N coast of Guernsey on 16 March 1880, possibly because compass was affected by the iron ore.	49°32′00″N 02°33′00″W						
1881	Kestrel	(United Kingdom)	Burhou	Sailing from London to Bordeaux with 20 passengers and cargo in patchy fog the ship struck Burhou Island, west of Alderney on 15 April 1881.							
1881	Bothalwood	(United Kingdom)	Jersey; St Ouen	A barque-rigged vessel sailing from Cartagena for Leith hit rocks in St Ouen's bay. No crew were lost.							
1881	Caledonia	(United Kingdom)	Jersey; St Helier	Formerly called the "Hogarth", it was bought in 1878 by London & South Western Railway Co. Carrying mail and passengers from Southampton to Guernsey Sark and Jersey, it was wrecked on 19 February 1881, off Oyster Rock, just outside St Helier harbour Jersey.	49°10′N 02°07′W						
1884	Echo	( (United Kingdom) Guernsey)	Jersey; La Corbière	Overwhelmed off the La Corbière, Jersey. All aboard drowned.	49°10′N 2°14′W						
1887	Ella	(Sweden):	Guernsey; Belgrave Bay	The Swedish wooden barque ELLA, built in 1851, on voyage from Gothenburg to Liverpool with a cargo of pit props, was lost after running aground in Belgrave Bay (Belle Grève), Guernsey on 11 January 1887. There were no casualties.	49°28′30″N 02°31′30″W						
1887	Brighton	(United Kingdom)	Guernsey	The paddle steamer was sailing from Weymouth to Guernsey on 29 January 1887 the ship was travelling faster than they thought and hit a rock, in fog, north of Guernsey causing the ship to founder. there was no loss of life.	49°31′30″N 2°29′00″W						
1888	Yorouba	(France)	Guernsey; Lihou	On a journey to Havre when she hit the Gibou rocks near Lihou Island west of Guernsey in fog and sank 2 miles (3.2 km) from shore and 7NM from Les Hanois Lighthouse. All passengers and crew were saved.							
1892	Abbey Town	(Sweden)	Guernsey; Perelle Bay	The 3 masted sailing barque, previously called Ida struck Perelle Bay off the west coast of Guernsey on 17 November 1892 on voyage from Raine Island to Granville, Manche, with a cargo of Guano.	49°28′00″N 02°39′00″W						
1895	Behira	(United Kingdom)	Alderney	The Glasgow steamer struck the rocks near Mannez lighthouse in Alderney in adverse weather. She was carrying coal.							
1895	Ambassadrice	(France)	Guernsey	En route from St Malo for Newfoundland destined for Cod the Sailing vessel had a crew of 7 and 90 male passengers. It ran onto rocks on the south coast of Guernsey on 2 March 1895 in fog and foundered close to shore. All managed to climb to the top of the cliffs safely apart from one elderly man who slipped and fell to his death.							
1896	Marie Fanny	(France)	Burhou	The French steamer struck rocks near Burhu, 14 died.							
1898	Channel Queen	(United Kingdom)	Guernsey	steaming from Plymouth to the Channel Islands was wrecked in bad weather and fog on the Black Rock, 1.5NM off Guernsey. Forty were saved but 14 passengers and 5 crew were drowned.							
1899	Stella	(United Kingdom)	Les Casquets	The SS Stella (1890) on her way from Southampton to Guernsey and Jersey ran full speed in thick fog onto Les Casquets reef near Alderney on 30 March 1899 and sank within minutes with the loss of over eighty lives.	49°43′7″N 02°23′27″W						
1899	Belgique	(Belgium)	Open Sea	Formerly called Mount Hebron. Ownership by "Armement Deppe" (Antwerp). Cargo of 10 tramways for Cairo. On her way to Alexandria. She foundered 6 nm NW of the Casquets							

== 20th and 21st centuries ==
Year	Ship	Flag	Location	Narrative	Coordinates					
Year	Ship	Flag	Location	Narrative	Coordinates	1900	‘’’Ibex’’’	(United Kingdom)	Guernsey	The mail boat hit the Platte Fougere reef on 5 January 1900 in bad visibility. Two fatalities. The ship was raised in July 1900 and returned to service.
1900	Antoinette	(France)	Guernsey	The Dundee class yacht, en route from Saint-Cast-Le-Guildo (Brittany, France) to Denmark loaded with wheat, was lost on 22 August 1900 with all hands S of Guernsey.	49°23′00″N 02°31′00″W					
1900	Hermann Köppen'	(Germany)	Alderney	Ran aground on the rocks Barsier, west of Alderney on 5 March 1900 and was wrecked.						
1900	Rossgull	(United Kingdom)	Jersey; La Corbière	The ship on a voyage from Plymouth to Jersey ran aground on 4 December at night off La Corbière, Jersey in a gale. 11 were saved but 9 men in one lifeboat drowned	49°10′N 2°14′W					
1901	HMS Viper	(Royal Navy)	Alderney	The Viper-class destroyer launched on 8 September 1899, this ship was the first turbine powered destroyer. Foundered on ´le Renonquet´ Reef off Alderney on 3 August 1901 during naval manoeuvers. Capable of 37 knots, she struck doing 22 knots, capsized and broke in two. All survived. Blown up by Navy to stop turbine secrets being leaked out.	49°44′14″N 02°16′32″W					
1902	Liverpool	(United Kingdom)	Alderney	The iron four-masted sailing ship, the largest in the world at the time, was en route from Antwerp to San Francisco with general cargo when she sailed slowly onto the rocks at Hommeaux Florains, on the northeastern tip of Alderney on 25 February 1902 in fog. There was no loss of life. Accessible via a causeway the people of Alderney "helped" recover the cargo.						
1903	Nord	(France)	Burhou	Ran aground and was wrecked on Burhou Island off Alderney on 29 May 1903 on a voyage from Boulogne to Bayonne with general cargo.						
1904	Fauvette	( (France) )	Chausey	The schooner sank just north of the Chausey Islands on 7 January 1904.						
1904	Noord	(Netherlands)	Burhou	wrecked on 25 September 1904 SE of Burhou Alderney Channel Islands						
1904	Dunsinane	(United Kingdom)	Guernsey; St Sampson’s	The two masted ship, carrying granite, set sail at 7pm and ran into strong tides, forcing it onto the Black Rock outside St Sampsons' harbour Guernsey. The next few days the planking was removed from the hull and the cargo removed into waiting carts.	49°27′00″N 02°40′00″W					
1906	Ocean Queen	(United Kingdom)	Guernsey	Wrecked on south coast of Guernsey on 2 March 1906. Sailing from London to Jersey with cement and general.	49°25′20″N 02°39′20″W					
1906	Courier II	(United Kingdom);	Jethou	The ship struck Les Anons a rock south of Jethou on 30 April 1906. There were 29 survivors and 10 deaths. The ship was salvaged on 1 August 1906 and returned to service after repairs.	49°27′30″N 02°28′00″W					
1906	Leros	(Germany)	Burhou	En route from Newcastle to Lisbon with a 240-ton cargo of Singer sewing machines when she ran aground in thick fog on Tasse de la Frette Rocks, NW Burhou near Alderney on 29 May 1906. The crew initially refused help, threatening to shoot the rescuers. The wreck was looted, resulting in Singer stopping production of that model as no spare parts would be available.						
1906	Forth	(United Kingdom)	Herm	Ran aground in thick fog and was wrecked on Long Pierre Rock off Herm, on 7 August 1906, whilst on passage from Middlesbrough to Saint-Malo.						
1908	Rosella	(United Kingdom)	Roches Douvres	The ship was on a voyage from Penarth to Granville carrying a cargo of coal, when she was wrecked at Roches Douvres Rocks, 15 miles (24 km) from La Corbière, Jersey on 16 September 1908.						
1908	France	(France):	Minquiers	The cargo schonner that foundered on 15 November 1908 on the Minquiers S of Jersey when en route from Dunkirk for Granville with a cargo of Scoria.						
1909	Mjølner	(Norway)	Burhou	The cargo ship was on a voyage from N. Shields to Naples with a cargo of coal and coke, when she was wrecked, off Burhou, Alderney on 26 January 1909.						
1909	Dagenham	(United Kingdom)	Guernsey; Grunes de L’Ouest	A British cargo steamer of 1,466 grt built in 1907 by John Crown & Sons for Furness, Withy & Co. On 18 April 1909, when north-west Grunes, near Cobo Bay, Guernsey she ran aground and was wrecked on 8 April 1909 while on a voyage from the Tyne to Saint-Malo with a cargo of coal.						
1909	Anne Marie	(France)	Minquiers	Barge based Erquy (region of Brittany, France). Carrying cobblestone from its home port to Saint Malo (same area), was wrecked on the Minquiers tray. On 23 October 1909.						
1909	Becquet	(France)	Chausey	The 200ton ship was lost in the Chausey Islands.						
1910	La Boulonaisse	(France)	Chausey	The 67-ton ship carrying cement from Boulogne to Saint Malo sank on a reef of the Chausey Islands on 23 February 1910. 5 men were saved.						
1910	Nordenskjold	(Russia)	Guernsey	The Russian wooden brigantine, on voyage from La Rochelle to Llanelly with a cargo of pit props, was wrecked in Belgrave Bay (Belle Grève), Guernsey on 28 February 1910.						
1910	Wear	(United Kingdom)	Guernsey	The British steel cargo ship WEAR, built in 1905 by Austin S. P. & Son Ltd. and owned at the time of her loss by Witherington & Everett SS Co., on voyage from Sunderland to Saint-Servan with a cargo of coal, was wrecked on 15 May 1910 on the west coast of Guernsey Channel Islands. There were no casualties.	49°24′55″N 02°32′0″W					
1910	Felix de Abasolo	(Spain)	Alderney; Île de Raz	Carrying a cargo of coal, she ran aground in dense fog on Les Boufresses reef just north of Île de Raz Alderney on 7 June 1910 and broke her back. The crew got ashore and sheltered in the fort.						
1910	Terra	(United Kingdom):	Alderney	En route from the Port of Tyne to Genoa with a cargo of coal. She ran aground in fog at Chateau Letoc, Alderney on 11 June 1910.						
1910	Rap	(Norway)	Alderney	The Norwegian cargo ship was on a voyage from Newcastle to Gibraltar with a cargo of coal, when she was wrecked, off Alderney on 11 June 1910.						
1910	Linn O-Dee	(United Kingdom)	Burhou	The British iron cargo ship, on voyage from Portsmouth to Guernsey in ballast, was wrecked at La Lague on Burhou Island, close to Alderney on 18 June 1910.						
1911	Burton	(United Kingdom)	Alderney	The ship was leaving Alderney harbour when it suffered steering problems and ran aground on the Grois Reef. Floating free she was anchored but broke up in a storm on 11 January and became a total loss.						
1912	Rhenania	(Netherlands)	Burhou	She was wrecked on Burhou Island, close to Alderney on 7 April 1912 when en route from Rotterdam for Bilbao.						
1913	Agenoria	(United Kingdom)	Guernsey; Saint Sampson	The British wooden schooner AGENORIA, on voyage from St. Sampson, Guernsey to Rochester with a cargo of stone, was wrecked on Flat Rock (La Platte), off Saint Sampson, Guernsey on 1 May 1913.						
1915	St. Malo	(France)	Guernsey	The cargo ship capsized and sank in the English Channel off Guernsey on 13 November 1915 with the loss of eleven of her crew						
1916	Geraldine	(United Kingdom)	Herm	The barquentine a British wooden sailing ship foundered east of Herm, on 5 February 1916.						
1916	Flyn	(United Kingdom)	Alderney	The coaster foundered in the English Channel off Alderney, on 6 June 1916.						
1916	Demaris	(United Kingdom)	Open Sea	The schooner was scuttled in the English Channel 20 nautical miles (37 km) north of Alderney, on 4 August 1916 by SM UB-18 (Imperial German Navy). Her crew survived						
1916	Jeanne	(Denmark)	Open Sea	The cargo ship was sunk in the English Channel 16 nautical miles (30 km) north east of the Casquets, on 5 September 1916 by SM UB-29 (Imperial German Navy). Her crew survived.	49°51′N 2°17′W					
1916	Britannia	(United Kingdom)	Open Sea	The ketch was scuttled in the English Channel 12 nautical miles (22 km) north of Alderney, on 6 September 1916 by SM UB-23 (Imperial German Navy). Her crew survived.						
1916	Ethel	(Norway)	Open Sea	The cargo ship was sunk in the English Channel off the Casquets, on 14 September 1916 by SM UB-18 (Imperial German Navy). Her crew survived.						
1916	Brizeux	(France)	Open Sea	The barque was sunk in the English Channel 12 nautical miles (22 km) north north west of the Casquets, on 21 October 1916 by SM UB-18 (Imperial German Navy). Her crew survived.	49°51′N 2°48′W					
1916	Twig	(United Kingdom)	Open Sea	The schooner was scuttled in the English Channel 15 nautical miles (28 km) north of Alderney, on 24 October 1916 by SM UB-37 (Imperial German Navy). Her crew survived.						
1916	Pan	(Norway)	Open Sea	The coaster was shelled and sunk in the English Channel 7 nautical miles (13 km) north of the Casquets, on 26 October 1916 by SM UB-18 (Imperial German Navy). Her crew survived.	49°54′N 2°20′W					
1916	Sabine	(France)	Guernsey; Saint Sampson	The ketch was driven ashore at Saint Sampson, Guernsey, on 27 October 1916 and was wrecked. Her crew were rescued by the pilot boat Stork (United Kingdom).						
1916	Borø	(Norway)	Open Sea	The coaster was sunk in the English Channel 20 nautical miles (37 km) north north west of Jersey, by SM UB-18 (Imperial German Navy). Her crew survived.	49°35′N 3°04′W					
1916	Marie Caroussi	(Greece)	Open Sea	The cargo ship capsized off Jersey on 14 November 1916. Eight survivors were rescued by SS Director (United Kingdom						
1916	Saint Philippe	(France)	Open Sea	The cargo ship was sunk on 29 November 1916 in the English Channel 10 nautical miles (19 km) west south west of Guernsey, by SM UB-39 (Imperial German Navy) with the loss of nine of her crew.	49°25′N 3°06′W					
1916	Helge	(Sweden)	Open Sea	The coaster was sunk in the English Channel 6 nautical miles (11 km) north of Guernsey, on 4 December 1916 by SM UB-35 (Imperial German Navy). Her crew survived.	48°49′N 2°45′W					
1917	SM UC-18	(Imperial German Navy)	Open Sea	The Type UC II submarine was sunk by gunfire in the English Channel west of Jersey by the Q-ship HMS Lady Olive (Royal Navy) with the loss of all 28 crew.	49°15′N 02°34′W					
1917	HMS Lady Olive	(Royal Navy):	Open Sea	The Q-ship was sunk in the English Channel west of Jersey by SM UC-18 (Imperial German Navy). Her crew were rescued by French destroyer Dunois (French Navy).	49°15′N 02°34′W					
1917	Agnes Cairns	(United Kingdom)	Open Sea	The sailing vessel was scuttled in the English Channel 8 nautical miles (15 km) north east of Alderney, on 16 April 1917 by SM UC-65 (Imperial German Navy). Her crew survived.						
1917	La Manche	(France)	Open Sea	The barque was scuttled on 1 May 1917 in the English Channel 8 nautical miles (15 km) north of the Les Hanois Lighthouse, Guernsey, by SM UC-66 (Imperial German Navy). Her crew survived.						
1917	Helge	(Sweden)	Guernsey	The coaster was sunk after hitting a mine in the English Channel 6 nautical miles (11 km) north of Guernsey, on 3 May 1917 by SM UB-35 (Imperial German Navy). Her crew survived.	48°49′N 02°45′W					
1917	Dromore	(United Kingdom)	Guernsey	The coaster was shelled and sunk, on 18 May 1917, in the English Channel 6 nautical miles (11 km) south of St. Martin's Point, Guernsey, by SM UC-70 (Imperial German Navy). Her crew survived.						
1917	Cornelia	(Netherlands)	Open Sea	The schooner was sunk in the English Channel west of Jersey, on 6 June 1917 by SM UB-18 (Imperial German Navy).	49°10′N 2°40′W					
1917	Solway Prince	(United Kingdom)	Open Sea	The coaster was scuttled in the English Channel 8 nautical miles (15 km) north of Alderney on 27 June 1917, by SM UB-40 (Imperial German Navy). Her crew survived						
1917	Hirondelle	(France)	Sark	On voyage from Le Havre to St. Malo & St. Brieux with petrol, was lost after running aground off Sark on 12 October 1917.						
1917	Britannic	(United Kingdom)	Open Sea	The sailing vessel was scuttled in the English Channel 12 nautical miles (22 km) north north west of the Les Hanois Lighthouse, Guernsey, on 13 December 1917., using explosives, by SM UB-31 (Imperial German Navy). Her crew survived.	49°36′N 2°53′W					
1918	Jeanne Marie	(France)	Sark	The armed cargo ship struck a mine on 14 March 1918, laid by submarine SM UC-47 and sank in the English Channel off Sark, on 14 March 1918.	49°20′N 02°20′W					
1918	City of Winchester	(United Kingdom)	Open Sea	The ketch was shelled and sunk in the English Channel 10 nautical miles (19 km) north west by west of the Les Hanois Lighthouse, Guernsey, on 28 March 1918 by SM U-90 (Imperial German Navy). Her crew survived.	49°28′N 02°55′W					
1918	Figaro	(France)	Open Sea	On a voyage from Brest to Rouen carrying coal, the coaster was sunk, maybe by a mine, certainly after an explosion 3.5 nm SW of Les Hanois Lighthouse, west of Guernsey on 26 January 1918	49°22′00″N 02°45′00″W					
1919	Hastier	(Belgium)	Open Sea	The coaster, on her maiden voyage, departed Brixham, Devon, United Kingdom, for Barcelona, Spain. A damaged lifeboat discovered on 21 June by Courier (United Kingdom) and landed at Guernsey on 9 April 1911.						
1920	Cordier	(France	Alderney	During her first commercial trip from Nantes (region Pays de la Loire, France) to Rotterdam (Netherlands) loaded with iron ore, sank following a leak at N of Alderney on 18 March 1920. Only 4 sailors were rescued by the Norwegian steamer Wacland.						
1920	Equity	(United Kingdom):	Alderney	The railway steamship ran aground in fog on Alderney, carrying a cargo of potatoes from Jersey bound for Port of Hull on 25 May 1920. The ship was pulled off the rocks. She was refloated on 15 June.						
1920	Grandest	(United Kingdom)	Guernsey	The coaster struck rocks off Les Hanois Lighthouse, Guernsey, on 20 November 1920 and sank. All twelve crew were rescued by a trawler.	49°26′00″N 02°42′00″W					
1920	Evangelistria	(Greece)	Casquets	The cargo ship foundered in the English Channel off the Casquets, Guernsey, on 27 November 1920. Her crew survived.						
1921	Adamantios Lemos	(Greece)	Open Sea	The cargo ship en route from Portman (Spain) to Middlesbrough foundered near Guernsey on 25 January 1921. She had previously been salvaged in April 1919 by HM Tug "St Issey".						
1921	Baden	(Imperial German Navy)	Open Sea	A Bayern-class dreadnought sunk on 16 August 1921 as a target in Hurd Deep.	49°49′42″N 2°23′21″W					
1921	Clarrie	(United Kingdom)	Guernsey; St Sampson	The cargo ship was wrecked at the entrance to St. Sampson's, on the Roustel Rock, Guernsey, on 5 September 1921, inward from Newhaven, East Sussex, in ballast and sank. All seven crew were rescued.	49°28′50″N 02°30′20″W					
1922	Cairnside	(United Kingdom)	Herm	The coaster struck a rock west of Sark, on 24 January 1922 and sank north of Herm. All thirteen crew survived.						
1922	Emily Eveson	(United Kingdom)	Alderney	The cargo ship ran aground on the Clougne Rock, on the south east coast of Alderney, on 21 May 1922 and was wrecked. Her crew were rescued.						
1922	Western Belle	(United Kingdom)	Open Sea	The cargo ship had an engine fire 16 nm NNW of the Hanois Lighthouse, Guernsey Channel Islands and sank.						
1923	Empress	(United Kingdom)	Alderney	The sailing ship was driven ashore at Bibette Head, Alderney, on 22 February 1923 and sank. Her crew were rescued.						
1923	Caesarea	(United Kingdom)	Jersey; St Helier	On departing St Helier harbour, the passenger ferry and mailboat struck the Pignonet Rock, off Moilmont Point, Jersey on 7 July 1923 and was holed. Her captain decided to return to port, but she later struck the Oyster Rock and was beached at St Helier. All 370 passengers were rescued. She was refloated on 20 July and taken to England for repairs. She was later refloated and towed to Southampton, Hampshire, where she arrived on 4 August.	49°10′30″N 2°07′30″W					
1924	Buchanness	(United Kingdom)	Burhou	The cargo liner suffered a failure of her propeller shaft off Start Point in the English Channel and consequently drifted ashore at Burhou, Alderney, on 13 April 1924. All on board were rescued by Baron Cawdor (United Kingdom) and RFA Slavol (Royal Navy).						
1925	Atala	(France)	Jersey; La Rocque	The cargo ship, formerly a US mine sweeper, struck rocks off La Rocque, Jersey, on 2 October 1925 and sank. All fifteen crew survived.						
1926	Ribbledale	(United Kingdom)	Jersey	The cargo ship was wrecked Litaquerel Point, Bouley Bay, Jersey on 27 December 1926 when en route from London for Jersey in ballast.						
1927	La Tourmente	(France)	Sark	The schooner sprang a leak and foundered off Sark, on 6 February 1927. Her crew were rescued.						
1927	Beatty Rose	(United Kingdom)	Casquets	The collier foundered off the Casquets, on 1 April 1927. All thirteen crew were rescued.						
1928	Foreland	(United Kingdom)	Guernsey	The collier ran aground on the north of Guernsey on 20 February 1928. She capsized and sank.	49°30′20″N 2°29′30″W					
1929	Glencregagh	(United Kingdom)	Guernsey; Vazon bay	The coaster, en route from Weymouth for Lézardrieux with a cargo of empty hampers, ran aground on Vazon Bay on the west coast of Guernsey, on 3 June 1929. She broke in tow and sank. All eleven crew survived.	49°28′30″N 2°37′30″W					
1929	Theodora	(United Kingdom):	Minquiers	The cargo ship sank off the Minquiers Rocks, Jersey, on 16 August 1929. Her crew were rescued.						
1930	Beauport	(United Kingdom)	Guernsey; Little Roussel	The cargo ship was wrecked off Guernsey in the Little Roussel on 16 February 1930. Towed to a beach next to St Peter Port harbour, she sank, could not be refloated and was blown up with explosives.	49°27′00″N 02°31′00″W					
1931	Raffio	(Italy):	Sark	The salvage vessel capsized and sank off Sark, Channel Islands, with the loss of one of her eighteen crew.						
1932	St Patrick	(United Kingdom)	Jersey; La Corbière	The passenger ferry ran aground in fog off La Corbière, Jersey, on 5 August 1932. The 314 passengers were rescued by Duke of Normandy, Isle of Sark and St Julien (all United Kingdom). St Patrick was taken in tow in St Helier harbor. She was later refloated and towed into Saint Helier for temporary repairs.	49°10′N 2°14′W					
1932	Carrouest I	(France)	Open Sea	The coaster foundered in the English Channel 2 nautical miles (3.7 km) south of Alderney on 5 November 1932. All five crew survived.						
1932	Le Poilu	(France)	Sark	The Ketch sank off Sark on 22 November 1932	49°26′N 2°20′W					
1935	Yorkvalley	(United Kingdom)	Guernsey; St Sampson	The coaster struck a rock and sank 0.5 nm off Saint Sampson, Guernsey, on 2 April 1935. All twelve crew survived. She was raised on 15 April.						
1935	Silvonia	(United Kingdom)	Jersey	The cargo ship struck a rock and sank off Jersey on 6 May 1935. The crew were rescued						
1935	Princess Ena	(United Kingdom)	Open Sea	The passenger ferry caught fire and sank 10 nautical miles (19 km) south of Jersey, on 4 August 1935. The crew were rescued by Duke of Normandy and St. Julien (both United Kingdom).	49°3′25″N 02°21′32″W					
1936	Schelde	(Netherlands)	Jersey; Pierres de Lecq	The coaster ran aground on the Pierres de Lecq rocks, 5 nautical miles (9.3 km) north of Jersey, on 22 November 1936. All crew survived.	49°17′N 2°17′W					
1937	Briseis	(France)	Guernsey; Vazon bay	The coaster carrying wines and spirits struck a rock, tried to beach on Vazon Bay, Guernsey but sank 1.3 nm offshore, on 1 October 1937. All 28 crew were rescued by local fishing boats. Much of the cargo was washed ashore and "rescued" by the locals.	49°28′30″N 2°37′30″W					
1940	Anvers	(Nazi Germany)	Chausey	This 1916 ship was towing a barge on a convoy from Granville to Jersey on 21 December 1940, when it got into difficulties and ended up sinking on the Chausey islands.						
1941	Staffa	(Nazi Germany)	Alderney	This ship, owned by J.B. Le Page Co was taken over by the Germans in 1940. She sank on 13 March 1941 off the jetty in Alderney harbour.						
1942	Diamant	(Kriegsmarine)	Jersey; St Helier	Originally she sailed under a Belgian flag, the ship was wrecked on the Dogs Nest rocks outside St Helier harbour Jersey on 20 September 1942 carrying essential commodities such as footwear and cheese for the civilian population.	49°10′N 02°07′W					
1942	Kromwijk	(Germany)	Jersey	The ancient houseboat from the Rhine, taken over in 1940 and converted in Rotterdam was working for the Organisation Todt, carrying a cargo of bricks. It was attacked by Allied aircraft and sunk S of Jersey on 7 December 1942.	49°09′N 02°12′W					
1943	Schokland	(Netherlands) (Kriegsmarine)	Jersey; Portelet Bay	The cargo ship, under German command, carrying sacks of cement and iron girders and 284 troops returning from leave, sank on 5 January 1943, after hitting a reef a mile off Portelet Bay, Jersey. 106 of the troops who were being transported in a hold, died.	49°08′45″N 02°11′12″W					
1943	SS Xaver Dorsch	(Netherlands) (Kriegsmarine)	Alderney	The freighter, formerly the Guernsey ship Staffa, with sick Russian OT workers in the holds, was lost after it ran aground on Alderney after breaking its moorings in January 1943 in a gale. A number of the slave labourers died after being left in the holds for days. The ship was pulled off the beach but sunk by bombing in April 1944.						
1943	V-703	(Kriegsmarine)	Alderney	The 300-ton patrol boat ex trawler "Henny Fricke" built in 1924, was lost after it ran aground on Alderney on 14 January 1943 in a gale after trying to pull 'Xaver Dorsch' off the beach.	49°43′N 02°10′W					
1943	M 4606	(Kriegsmarine)	Guernsey; St Peter Port	The auxiliary minesweeper was bombed and sunk at St Peter Port, Guernsey, on 29 January 1943 by Allied aircraft	(49°27′N 02°32′W)					
1943	Helma	(Kriegsmarine)	Jersey	The German motor schooner, carrying a cargo of potatoes, was sunk by Whirlwind fighter bombers on 27 April 1943.						
1943	Arnold Maersk	(Denmark)	Jersey	The cargo ship, requisitioned by the French, then under German command, carrying a cargo of 250 lb bombs, was wrecked on Grune aux Dardes, Jersey on 22 May 1943						
1943	Oost-Vlaanderen	(Germany)	Guernsey	En route from Saint Malo to Guernsey carrying cement and guns, it was attacked by the RAF and holed 1.5 miles (2.4 km) from St Peter Port harbour, Guernsey, on 23 May 1943 with the loss of all hands.	49°26′24″N 02°29′47″W					
1943	M-483	(Kriegsmarine)	Open Sea	The M-class minesweeper was bombed and sunk between Sark and Alderney, on 15 June 1943 by Westland Whirlwind aircraft of 263 Squadron, Royal Air Force.						
1943	HMS Charybdis	(Royal Navy)	Open Sea	The Dido-class cruiser was torpedoed and sunk west of Jersey off Ouessant, Finistère, France, on 23 October 1943 by T23 and T27 (both Kriegsmarine) with the loss of 452 crew. A number of bodies were washed ashore in Guernsey and given, by the Germans, a military funeral at le Foulon cemetery. British Navy, cruiser built in 1940 accompanied by the destroyer Limbourne and five other vessels (Grenville, Rocket, Talybont, Stevenstone and Wensleydale) was engaged in an offensive sweep off the French coast between Ushant (Ouessant) and the Channel Islands on the night of 23 October 1943. The Force had been tracked by German radar and torpedo boats were sent to intercept. Visibility was poor and the vessels ran into the enemy light force of the German 4th TB Flotilla which managed to avoid their fire and to discharge a salvo of torpedoes with disastrous effect. The Charybdis was struck on port side by a torpedo, followed about five minutes later by another. She turned over and sank by the stern. Thirty officers, including the captain, and 432 ratings were killed. Only four officers and 103 ratings were saved.	48°59′N 3°39′W					
1943	HMS Limbourne	(Royal Navy)	Open Sea	World War II: The Hunt-class destroyer was attacked off Ouessant by T22 (Kriegsmarine) and severely damaged on 23 October 1943. One officer and 41 ratings being killed. Unable to tow her, she was scuttled by gunfire from HMS Rocket (Royal Navy).						
1944	Bizon	(Nazi Germany)	Jersey; La Corbière	The cargo ship en route to Guernsey was sunk off La Corbière, Jersey on 8 May 1944 by MTBs 91, 92, 227 and 229 (Free French Naval Forces). It was reported that the MTB's fired on the survivors, clinging to straw bales.	49°21′N 2°27′W					
1944	M-83	(Kriegsmarine)	Open Sea	The M-class minesweeper was sunk after being attacked off Cap de la Hague, by British motor torpedo boats, HMS MTB 704 and 714 from 63rd MTB Flotilla near Jersey on 14 June 1944. 70 crew lost.						
1944	M-343	(Kriegsmarine)	Open Sea	The M-class minesweeper was sunk after being attacked by is sunk after being attacked by HMS Ashanti and the Polish destroyer ORP Piorun at 0130 hrs, 9m SW Jersey, on 14 June 1944						
1944	V-211 (Seydlitz)	(Kriegsmarine)	Jersey	The patrol boat Seydlitz, 499tons German patrol vessel (converted trawler?) believed sunk by allied Motor Torpedo boats west of Jersey on 19 June 1944	49°0′N 2°30′W					
1944	German patrol boat V-205 (Franz Westermann)	(Kriegsmarine)	Guernsey	Armed Trawler was sunk by the RAF in St Peter Port harbour, Guernsey on 15 June 1944						
1944	M-4601	(Kriegsmarine)	Open Sea	The minesweeper was sunk on night of 7/8 July in the English Channel off the Channel Islands by HMCS Huron (Royal Canadian Navy and HMS Tartar (Royal Navy) as part of "Operation Dredger", the destruction of German security vessels.						
1944	M-4605	(Kriegsmarine)	Open Sea	The minesweeper was sunk on night of 7/8 July in the English Channel off the Channel Islands by HMCS Huron (Royal Canadian Navy and HMS Tartar (Royal Navy) as part of "Operation Dredger", the destruction of German security vessels.						
1944	German patrol boat V-209 (Dr. Rudolf Wahrendorff PG-383)	(Kriegsmarine)	Guernsey	Armed Trawler carrying ammunition was sunk by Grumman Avenger of 850 Naval Air Squadron RAF off the entrance to St Peter Port harbor Guernsey on 24 July 1944	49°27′10″N 2°31′10″W					
1944	USS PT-509	(United States Navy)	Open Sea	The ELCO 80' -class PT Boat was operating closely with PT-508 and with PT-503 and PT-507 in support, in a pea soup fog they encountered a German minesweeper group heading south towards Corbiere, PT-509 was shelled, it rammed the side of a Kriegsmarine Minesweeper off Jersey, caught fire and blew up, one wounded survivor was taken prisoner.	49°11′N 02°15′W					
1949	Hanna	(United Kingdom)	Jersey; L'Etacq	The British motor-schooner, built in 1915, on voyage from Plymouth to Jersey with a cargo of lime, was wrecked off L'Etacq, Jersey on 19 November 1949. HANNA was totally lost and there are still engine remains of her on the rocks today.						
1950	Edirne	(Turkey)	Burhou	The cargo ship, carrying a cargo of cattle cake, ran aground on the Ortach Reef, off Burhou Alderney, on 29 January 1950. Floated free and sank under tow the next day. All 50 crew were rescued.						
1950	Voorwarts	(Netherlands)	Jersey; Pierres de Lecq	The coaster en route from Littlehampton to Saint Malo ran aground on the Pierres de Lecq reef, off Jersey, on 26 March 1950 and was abandoned and sank.	49°17′N 2°17′W					
1951	Affray	(Royal Navy)	Open Sea	A Royal Navy A-class submarine, lost with all hands on 17 April 1951, on a training exercise 7.5 miles NW Alderney.	49°50′N 2°34′W					
1952	Heathery Brae	(United Kingdom)	Guernsey; Bordeaux harbour	Was engaged in salvage work over the wreck of CLARRIE (177grt/1901) off Bordeaux harbour, Guernsey. Timed explosive charges placed on wreck but she could not move clear in time and was severely damaged by the explosion. She launched her life boat and the four crew pulled clear before the vessel foundered on 4 May 1952.	49°29′N 02°30′W					
1952	Fermain	(United Kingdom)	Guernsey; St Sampson	Whilst on a voyage from Swansea to Guernsey with Anthracite, the cargo ship ran aground on Black Rock off St Sampson's, Guernsey, on 29 December 1952. Declared a constructive loss in 1953.						
1956	Conlea	(United Kingdom)	Open Sea	Built in Germany in 1939 and called "Gunther Harmann" in 1945 was renamed the "Empire Conlea". The coaster foundered in heavy weather 15 nautical miles (28 km) off La Corbière, Jersey.						
1961	Heron	(Netherlands):	Jersey	The coaster, sailing from Jersey to Portsmouth, with a cargo of tomatoes, sank off Jersey, on 16 September 1961. Of her 11 crew, six were rescued by Cranborne (United Kingdom) and two by Port du Bouc (France).						
1962	Ridunian	(United Kingdom):	Guernsey	On voyage from Alderney to Guernsey with a cargo of gravel, was wrecked on rocks, off Guernsey on 28 March 1962.						
1963	Johan Collett	(Norway)	Open Sea	The cargo ship en route from Sardinia to Ghent with a cargo of zinc ore sank on 6 February 1963 after the cargo shifted in a force 10 gale. Nine men were saved by the Guernsey RNLI lifeboat, earning their Gold Medal and also one from the Norwegian Lifeboat Institution.						
1965	La Salle	(Liberia)	Guernsey; Grunes de L’Ouest	The 5,179-ton ship struck the Grunes de L’Ouest rocks off Guernsey on 28 May 1965. There were no casualties and the 40 people were rescued by the Guernsey RNLI relief lifeboat.	49°17′N 02°23′W					
1967	Constantia 2	(United Kingdom)	Casquets	The tanker was carrying fresh water en route to Gibraltar when she struck the Les Casquets reef on 23 January 1967 in a storm, all crew were rescued, the ship broke her back						
1967	President Garcia	(Philippines)	Guernsey	The cargo ship ran aground in Saints Bay, Guernsey, Channel Islands. Refloated on 20 July.	49°25′23″N 2°33′25″W					
1973	Captain Niko	(Somalia)	Open Sea	The ship was sailing from Rotterdam to Alexandria with cargo fertilizer. In heavy seas the cargo shifted. The ship was taken in tow, but the list increased and the ship sank 3 miles (4.8 km) north of Guernsey on 5 May 1973.	49°32′47″N 02°35′20″W					
1973	Kondor	(Greece)	Open Sea	The cargo ship collided with H Capelo (Portugal) in thick fog off Guernsey, on 10 September 1973 and sank with the loss of ten crew.	49°36′N 2°48′W					
1973	Armas	(Cyprus):	Alderney	The cargo ship ran aground on Great Nannels reefs, Alderney on 26 November 1973, with the loss of one of her 23 crew. She subsequently broke in two a few days later and became a total loss	49°44′30″N 2°15′00″W					
1973	Elwood Mead	(United States)	Guernsey	The bulk carrier ran aground on her maiden voyage on Les Grunes de Nord-Ouest off Guernsey, on 25 December 1973. She was refloated on 24 February 1974.	49°30′14″N 2°37′22″W					
1974	Prosperity	(Cyprus)	Guernsey nr Lihou	The cargo ship struck La Conchee reef and sank west of Guernsey, on 16/17 January 1974. All eighteen crew of seventeen men and one woman were lost.	49°28′17″N 2°38′40″W					
1978	Orion	(United Kingdom)	Guernsey	The oil rig, being towed on a barge, ran aground at Grandes Rocques at Guernsey, on 2 February 1978, when the tow broke in a storm. Her crew were rescued by the St. Peter Port Lifeboat and Royal Navy helicopters.	49°29′19″N 2°35′36″W					
1984	Radiant Med	(Liberia)	Open Sea	The cargo ship foundered off Guernsey, on 24 January 1984 after a hatch cover was smashed in heavy seas. Seventeen of the 26 crew were lost. Nine survivors were rescued by the frigate Casabianca (Marine Nationale) and taken to St Peter Port.						
1995	St Malo	(France)	Jersey	The Channiland Ferries catamaran, travelling from Jersey to Sark with 307 passengers and crew on board, hit a rock known as Le Frouquieat close to Corbière Lighthouse and began to take on water. The passengers were evacuated to life rafts, with around 50 suffering injuries. The vessel was recovered and initially beached in St Aubin's bay, before being refitted and returned to service.						
2003	Vermontborg	(Romania)	Guernsey	This new ship, under tow from Romania to Germany, broke free and came aground on the La Capelle reef off Guernsey W coast.						
2008	Guyona	(United Kingdom)	Sark	Scallop dredger and stern trawler capsized leading to sinking. Sailed from Brixham to fishing grounds south of Little Sark on 24 June 2008. The crew was recovered by the Guernsey lifeboat.						
2014	Mellow Yellow	United Kingdom	Guernsey	The boat sank near to the Longue Pierre beacon off Guernsey. One of the men on board was found clinging to the beacon and the other swam ashore.						
2015	Melina of Fleet	(United Kingdom)	Guernsey	The yacht collided with Roustel Beacon and was impaled on the rocks and sank immediately, leaving only the tops of its masts visible. The St Peter Port RNLI lifeboat was nearby on a training exercise and rescued the vessel's four crew from the water.						
2022	L'Ecume II	(United Kingdom)	Jersey	The wooden trawler collided with Commodore Goodwill, a ferry, off St Ouen's Bay, Jersey. Being the much smaller vessel, she sank in deep water and all three of her crew perished.						
2025	Wild Wave	United Kingdom	Sark	While hauling up crab pots the fishing boat's gear snagged on a sandbank. The tension combined with the tide caused the boat to list, capsize, and sink. The lone skipper was rescued by a passing vessel.						

|}

== See also ==
- Bailiwick of Guernsey
- Transport in Guernsey
- Bailiwick of Jersey
- Transport in Jersey
