= List of ship launches in 1923 =

The list of ship launches in 1923 includes a chronological list of ships launched in 1923.

| | Ship | Class | Builder | Location | Country | Notes |
|---|---|---|---|---|---|---|
| 1 January | Général Bonaparte | Passenger ship | Chantiers & Ateliers de Provence | Port-de-Bouc | France | For Compagnie Marseillaise de Navires à Vapeur |
| 13 January | B-6 | B-class submarine | SECN | Cartagena | Spain | For Spanish Navy. |
| 16 January | Davisian | Cargo ship | Harland & Wolff | Belfast | United Kingdom | For F. Leyland. |
| 18 January | Inveravon | Tanker | Harland & Wolff | Belfast | United Kingdom | For British Mexican Petroleum Company. |
| 18 January | Submarine No. 69 (Ro-30) | Kaichū V-type submarine | Kawasaki | Kobe | Japan | For Imperial Japanese Navy |
| 20 January | Invergordon | Tanker | Harland & Wolff | Belfast | United Kingdom | For British Mexican Petroleum Company. |
| 1 February | Araby | Cargo ship | Harland & Wolff | Belfast | United Kingdom | For David MacIver & Co. |
| 2 February | Hussar | Luxury yacht | Burmeister & Wain | Copenhagen | Denmark | For E F Hutton |
| 2 February | Sarpedon | Refrigerated Cargo liner | Cammell Laird | Birkenhead | United Kingdom | For Blue Funnel Line |
| 15 February | Mooltan | Ocean liner | Harland & Wolff Ltd | Belfast | United Kingdom | For Peninsular and Oriental Steam Navigation Company |
| 15 February | Submarine No. 70 (Ro-31) | Kaichū V-type submarine | Kawasaki | Kobe | Japan | For Imperial Japanese Navy |
| 16 February | Delilian | Passenger ship | Harland & Wolff | Belfast | United Kingdom | For F. Leyland & Co. |
| 17 February | Dickenson | Cargo ship | Sun Shipbuilding & Drydock Company | Chester, Pennsylvania | United States | |
| 13 March | Patroclus | Cargo Liner | Scotts Shipbuilding & Engineering Co Ltd | Greenock | United Kingdom | For Blue Funnel Line |
| 16 March | Abukuma | Nagara-class cruiser | Uraga Dock Company | Uraga | Japan | For Imperial Japanese Navy |
| 19 March | Submarine No. 71 (Ro-32) | Kaichū V-type submarine | Kawasaki | Kobe | Japan | For Imperial Japanese Navy |
| 22 March | Minnewaska | Passenger ship | Harland & Wolff | Belfast | United Kingdom | For Atlantic Transport Line. |
| 31 March | S-43 | S-class submarine | William Cramp & Sons | Philadelphia | United States | For United States Navy |
| 4 April | Dorelian | Cargo ship | Harland & Wolff | Belfast | United Kingdom | For F. Leyland & Co. |
| 16 April | Trenton | Omaha-class cruiser | William Cramp & Sons | Philadelphia | United States | For United States Navy |
| 16 April | Medusa | Monitor | William Cramp & Sons | Philadelphia | United States | For United States Navy |
| 17 April | California | Ocean liner | Alexander Stephen & Sons Ltd | Glasgow | United Kingdom | For Peninsular and Oriental Steam Navigation Company |
| 19 April | Laguna | Cargo ship | Harland & Wolff | Belfast | United Kingdom | For Pacific Steam Navigation Company. |
| 19 April | Maloja | Ocean liner | Harland & Wolff Ltd | Belfast | United Kingdom | For Peninsular and Oriental Steam Navigation Company |
| 28 April | Deutschland | Ocean liner | Blohm & Voss | Hamburg | Germany | For Hamburg-Amerika Line |
| 30 April | Oakton | Cargo ship | Harland & Wolff | Belfast | United Kingdom | For Matthews Steamship Co. |
| 30 April | S-42 | S-class submarine | Bethlehem Shipbuilding Corporation | Quincy, Massachusetts | United States | For United States Navy |
| 19 May | Submarine No. 72 (Ro-61) | Type L4 submarine | Mitsubishi | Kobe | Japan | For Imperial Japanese Navy |
| 19 May | Fladengrund | Fishing trawler | G. Seebeck AG | Wesermünde | Germany | For Norddeutsche Hochseefischerei. |
| 5 June | Yūbari | Light cruiser | Sasebo Naval Arsenal | Sasebo | Japan | For Imperial Japanese Navy |
| 12 June | Submarine No. 51 (I-52/I-152) | Kaidai II-type submarine | Kure Naval Arsenal | Kure | Japan | For Imperial Japanese Navy |
| 26 June | S-45 | S-class submarine | William Cramp & Sons | Philadelphia | United States | For United States Navy |
| June | Carsten | Fishing trawler | G. Seebeck AG. | Wesermünde-Geestemünde | Germany | For L. Janssen & Co. |
| 31 July | Lesbian | Cargo ship | Swan, Hunter & Wigham Richardson Ltd. | Liverpool | United Kingdom | For Ellerman Lines Ltd |
| 14 August | Duguay-Trouin | Duguay-Trouin-class cruiser | Arsenal de Brest | Brest | France | For Marine Nationale |
| 11 September | S-46 | S-class submarine | Bethlehem Shipbuilding Corporation | Quincy, Massachusetts | United States | For United States Navy |
| 12 September | Nordnorge | Cargo liner | Trondhjems mekaniske Værksted | Trondheim | Norway | For Ofotens Dampskibsselskap |
| 19 September | Submarine No. 73 (Ro-62) | Type L4 submarine | Mitsubishi | Kobe | Japan | For Imperial Japanese Navy |
| September | Sheaf Field | Cargo ship | Blyth Shipbuilding & Dry Docks Co. Ltd | Blyth | United Kingdom | For Sheaf Steam Shipping Co. Ltd. |
| 9 October | Marblehead | Omaha-class cruiser | William Cramp & Sons | Philadelphia | United States | For United States Navy |
| 11 October | Gujarat | Passenger ship | Harland & Wolff | Belfast | United Kingdom | For Bank Line. |
| 12 October | Whitney | Dobbin-class destroyer tender | | | United States | For United States Navy |
| 2 February | Almirante Cervera | Almirante Cervera-class cruiser | Sociedad Española de Construcción Naval | Ferrol | Spain | For Armada Española |
| 26 October | Mamiya | Food supply ship | Kawasaki Shipbuilding Yard | | Japan | For Imperial Japanese Navy |
| 27 October | S-44 | S-class submarine | Bethlehem Shipbuilding Corporation | Quincy, Massachusetts | United States | For United States Navy |
| 15 November | Invergarry | Tanker | Harland & Wolff | Belfast | United Kingdom | For British Mexican Petroleum Company. |
| 22 November | Kathiawar | Passenger ship | Harland & Wolff | Belfast | United Kingdom | For Bank Line. |
| 23 November | Claus Rickmers | Cargo ship | Norderwerft AG | Wesermünde | Germany | For Rickmers Reederei |
| 30 October | Matsukaze | Kamikaze-class destroyer | Maizuru Naval Arsenal | Maizuru | Japan | For Imperial Japanese Navy |
| 8 December | Lochmonar | Cargo ship | Harland & Wolff | Belfast | United Kingdom | For Royal Mail Line. |
| 15 December | Voima | Icebreaker | Sandvikens Skeppsdocka och Mekaniska Verkstads Ab | Helsinki | Finland | For Finnish Board of Navigation |
| 18 December | Scoresby | Cargo ship | Robert Thompson & Sons Ltd | Sunderland | United Kingdom | For Headlam & Sons |
| 28 December | Hereford | Tank barge | Frederick Braby & Co. Ltd. | Deptford | United Kingdom | For Anglo-American Oil Co. Ltd. |
| 28 December | Monmouth | Tank barge | Frederick Braby & Co. Ltd. | Deptford | United Kingdom | For Anglo-American Oil Co. Ltd. |
| Date unknown | Asiatic | Cargo ship | Burntisland Shipbuilding Co. Ltd | Burntisland | United Kingdom | For private owner. |
| Date unknown | Barbara Marie | Cargo ship | J. Priestman & Co. Ltd. | Sunderland | United Kingdom | For private owner. |
| Date unknown | Carso | Cargo ship | Stabilimento Technico Triestino | Trieste | Italy | For Lloyd Triestino. |
| Date unknown | Charlotte Cords | Cargo ship | Neptun AG | Rostock | Germany | For Dampfschiff Gesellschaft August Cords GmbH |
| Date unknown | Gera | Cargo ship | Blohm & Voss | Hamburg | Germany | For Hamburg America Line. |
| Date unknown | Grete | Cargo ship | Neptun AG | Rostock | Germany | For C Mohlenburg Reederei GmbH |
| Date unknown | Heinrich Arp | Cargo ship | F Schichau | Hamburg | Germany | For H F C Arp Dampschiffs Reederei |
| Date unknown | H F Bailey | Lifeboat | J. Samuel White | Cowes | United Kingdom | For Royal National Lifeboat Institution |
| Date unknown | Ilona Siemers | Cargo ship | Nordseewerke. | Emden | Germany | For G. J. H. Siemers. |
| Date unknown | Pasajes | Cargo ship | Schiffswerke AG. | Hamburg | Germany | For Oldenburg-Portuguese Line. |
| Date unknown | Pickhuben | Cargo ship | Union Giesserei. | königsberg | Germany | For H. M. Gehrckens. |
| Date unknown | Rhenania | Cargo ship | Nüscke & Co | Stettin | Germany | For Westdeutsche Schiffahrts AG |
| Date unknown | Steelville | Cargo ship | J. Readhead & Sons Ltd. | South Shields | United Kingdom | For private owner. |
| Date unknown | Stettin | Cargo ship | Stettiner Oderwerke AG | Stettin | Germany | For Stettiner Dampfer Compagnie AG |
| Date unknown | T.C.I. No. 1 | Barge | Alabama Drydock and Shipbuilding Company | Mobile, Alabama | United States | For Tennessee Coal, Iron and Railroad Company. |
| Date unknown | T.C.I. No. 2 | Barge | Alabama Drydock and Shipbuilding Company | Mobile, Alabama | United States | For Tennessee Coal, Iron and Railroad Company. |
| Date unknown | T.C.I. No. 3 | Barge | Alabama Drydock and Shipbuilding Company | Mobile, Alabama | United States | For Tennessee Coal, Iron and Railroad Company. |
| Date unknown | T.C.I. No. 4 | Barge | Alabama Drydock and Shipbuilding Company | Mobile, Alabama | United States | For Tennessee Coal, Iron and Railroad Company. |
| Date unknown | T.C.I. No. 5 | Barge | Alabama Drydock and Shipbuilding Company | Mobile, Alabama | United States | For Tennessee Coal, Iron and Railroad Company. |
| Date unknown | T.C.I. No. 6 | Barge | Alabama Drydock and Shipbuilding Company | Mobile, Alabama | United States | For Tennessee Coal, Iron and Railroad Company. |
| Date unknown | T.C.I. No. 7 | Barge | Alabama Drydock and Shipbuilding Company | Mobile, Alabama | United States | For Tennessee Coal, Iron and Railroad Company. |
| Date unknown | T.C.I. No. 8 | Barge | Alabama Drydock and Shipbuilding Company | Mobile, Alabama | United States | For Tennessee Coal, Iron and Railroad Company. |
| Date unknown | T.C.I. No. 9 | Barge | Alabama Drydock and Shipbuilding Company | Mobile, Alabama | United States | For Tennessee Coal, Iron and Railroad Company. |
| Date unknown | Vulcan | Barge | Aldous Ltd. | Brightlingsea | United Kingdom | For Harrisons (London) Ltd. |
