= SS Tungenes =

A number of steamships operated by Det Stavangerske Dampskibsselskab have carried the name Tungenes.

- SS Tungenes (1922), shelled and sunk 24 January 1945
- SS Tungenes (1923), ex Grimsnes, in service 1947–61
- SS Tungenes (1929), built as Rogaland, carried name Tungenes 1964–65, now a museum ship at Stavanger
