= SS Pickhuben =

A number of steamships have carried the name Pickhuben.

- SS Pickhuben (1890), a passenger ship in service with Hansa Line 1890–1917
- SS Pickhuben (1923), a cargo ship in service with H M Gehrckens 1923–45
