= Rhenania =

Rhenania is the Latinised name for the Rhineland or the Rhenish in a wider sense and may refer to:

- Rhenania Alt, an ale from the German brewer Krombacher Brewery
- Rhenania Buchversand, a German publishing company
- Rhenania-Ossag, a German mineral oil company; see German-American Petroleum Company
- BSV Limburgia, a Dutch football club originally named Rhenania
- Corps Rhenania Heidelberg, a student fraternity in Heidelberg, Germany
- Corps Rhenania Tübingen, a student fraternity in Tübingen, Germany
- SS Rhenania, a list of ships

== See also ==
- Rhenanida, an order of scaly placoderms
