= John of Sandwich (ship) =

16th century pirate ship wrecked off Alderney

Pirates
- Name: John of Sandwich
- Namesake: Sandwich
- Fate: Wrecked off Alderney in the Bailiwick of Guernsey, 11 July 1566

General characteristics
- Class & type: Merchant ship
- Tons burthen: 140
- Propulsion: Sails
- Sail plan: Square-rigged
- Armament: Cannons, swivel gun

John of Sandwich was a 16th-century English pirate ship active during the early reign of Queen Elizabeth I. She was wrecked on the coast of Alderney on 11 July 1566.

Even though many members of the crew escaped Castle Cornet, the remaining crew faced trial for piracy. Queen Elizabeth I pardoned several men who claimed they had been deceived into a life of crime but the ship's captain, John Higgins, and another crew member, Robert Hitchins, were hanged at St Martin’s Point as an example to others.

== Career ==
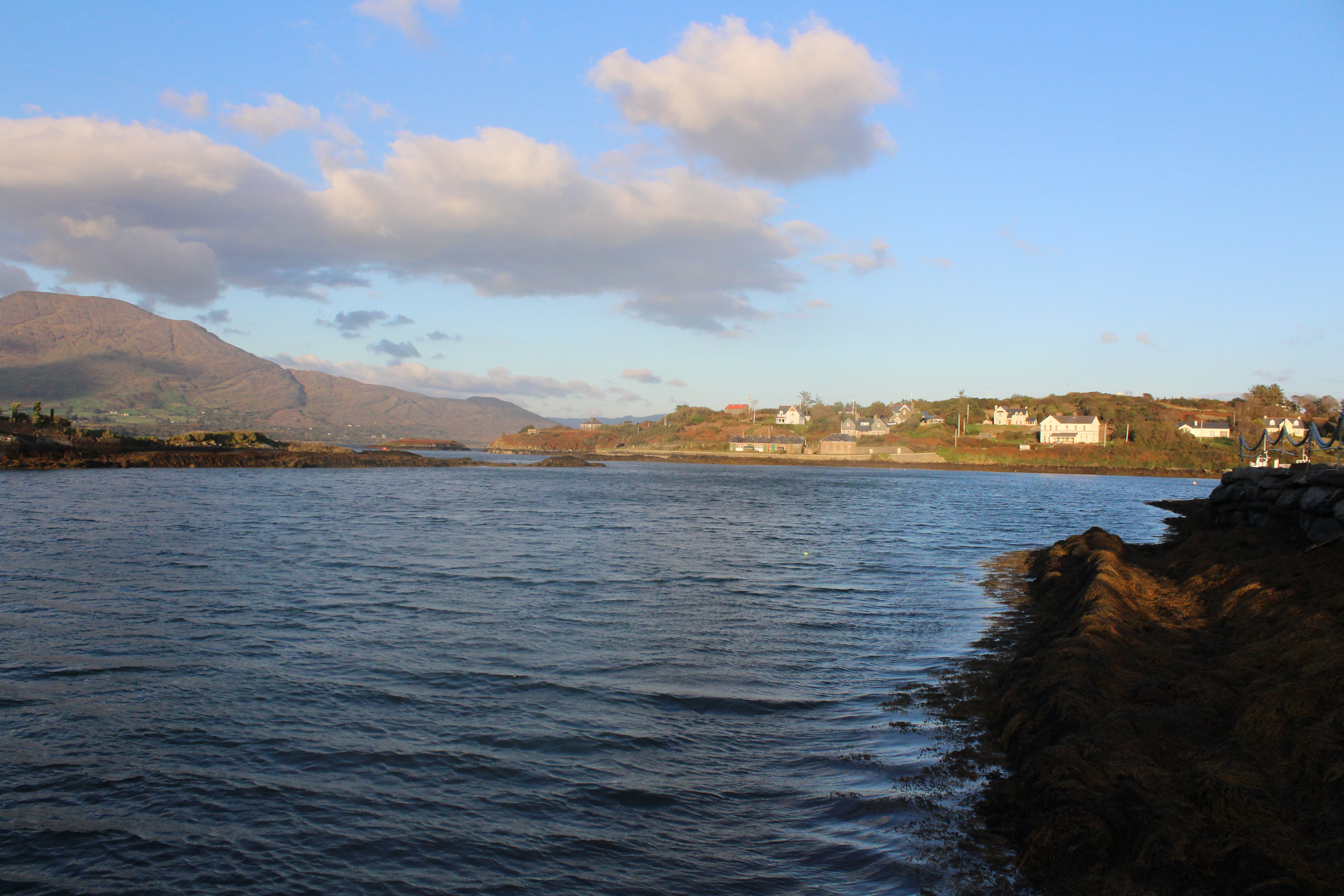
Bere Island and its harbour, where John of Sandwich unloaded is stolen wine.

John of Sandwich was either built in the port of Sandwich, Kent, or in Ireland. Owned by Thomas Bowes, she was initially under the command of Captain Heidon, a former Naval Sailor originally from Bantry Bay, and Richard Deigle. The two of them, with their associate Corbet, jointly decided to fit the John of Sandwich with guns to allow her to begin capturing other ships. She operated as part of a small fleet that was based in Kent, and in one instance the John of Sandwich captured a Flemish merchant vessel. The vessel mainly operated off mainland Spain. John of Sandwich generally carried cargo of stolen wine, which was transported to Bere Island in Bantry Bay and sold to Lord Donal O'Sullivan Beare.

The crew of John of Sandwich made an agreement with O'Sullivan in which the latter pledged to prevent Heidon, and a man called Lusingham, the captain of another pirate ship, from being arrested by British authorities. On one occasion, O'Sullivan did so, protecting the two men and their crews from being arrested by the crown's ships. Lusingham was eventually killed by a cannonball fired by a British ship while he was taunting the pursuing vessel by waving his hat at them mockingly off Berehaven. Corbet was on the same ship, but survived.

Heidon forced the crew to participate in a voyage to La Rochelle in June 1564, following which Heidon, Deigle and Corbet would be arrested after landing in Falmouth. John Higgins became captain of the vessel shortly after. However, both Heidon and Deigle, along with Corbet, eventually escaped custody and re-joined the crew of the John of Sandwich.

== Loss ==
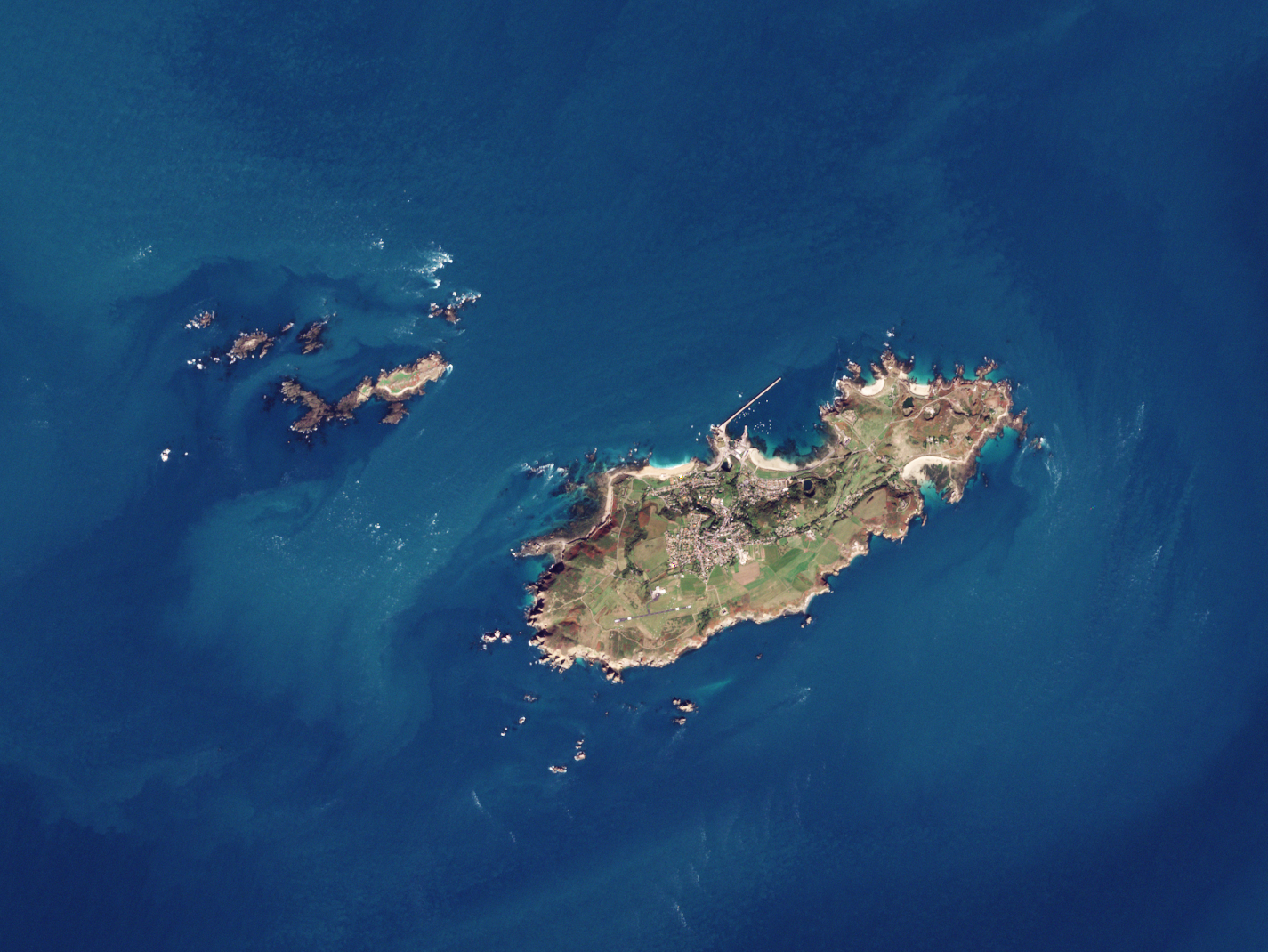
A bird's eye view of Alderney (right), Burhou (left), and the waters in which John of Sandwich went down.

On 11 July 1566, John of Sandwich sprang a leak in a storm, was driven onto rocks off Alderney and was wrecked. The surviving crew fled the wreck in two pinnaces. Captain Higgins, Robert Hitchins, Philip Readhead and Roger Shaster, among others, managed to reach the shore of Alderney in the first pinnace and confessed to being pirates. However, Heidon, Deigle and Corbett, with several others, escaped the wreck in the second pinnace and subsequently fled the Channel Islands.

== Legal proceedings ==
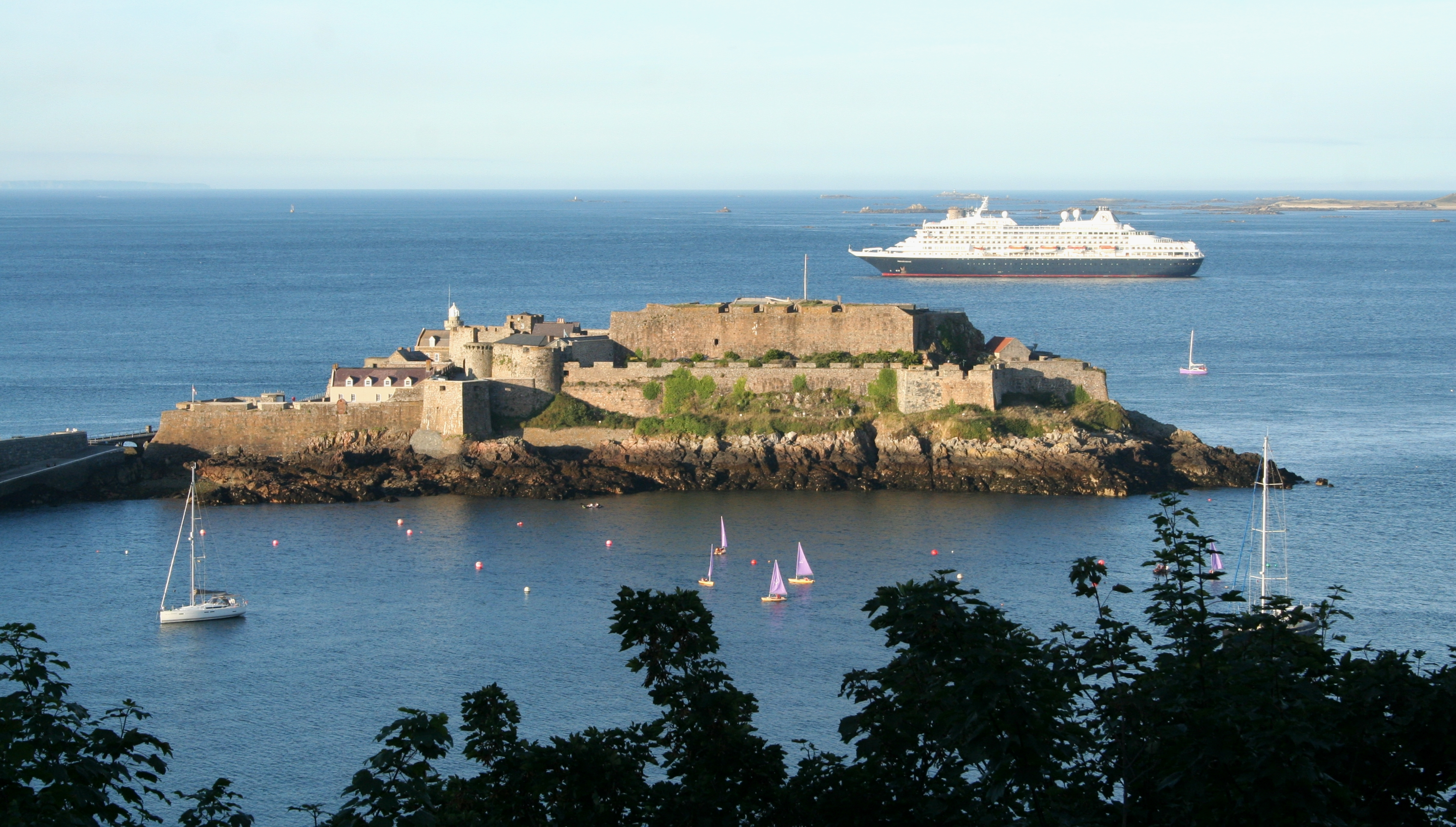
Castle Cornet, Saint Peter Port, in which the surviving crew were imprisoned.

The surviving crew was promptly arrested and transported to Castle Cornet in Guernsey to await trial and sentencing. However, several members of the crew managed to escape from the castle and successfully fled the island before they could be brought to trial.

Several crew members testified of the ship's piracy. John Hawker, a 25-year-old from Ilminster, Jenkin Lawrenson, aged 27, and Cornell Langton, aged 28, testified that they had been taken aboard the John of Sandwich while in Ireland. They had been under the assumption they were simply aiding in legal merchant trade and knew nothing of the vessel's piracy until out at sea, by which point they could not abandon the vessel without being punished for mutiny.

Another crew member testified that while the vessel was docked at Beerhaven a messenger sent by a member of the crew had reportedly arrived to confer with Heidon before his arrest, although the deponents were unaware of the purpose of this communication. The case ultimately made its way to the Privy Council of Queen Elizabeth I and the entirety of the crew, excluding John Higgins and Robert Hitchins, were later pardoned, "after a good and sharp admonition to beware hereafter to fall again into the damage of our laws". They were then made to "return to their native places" in order "to get their living by honest labour".

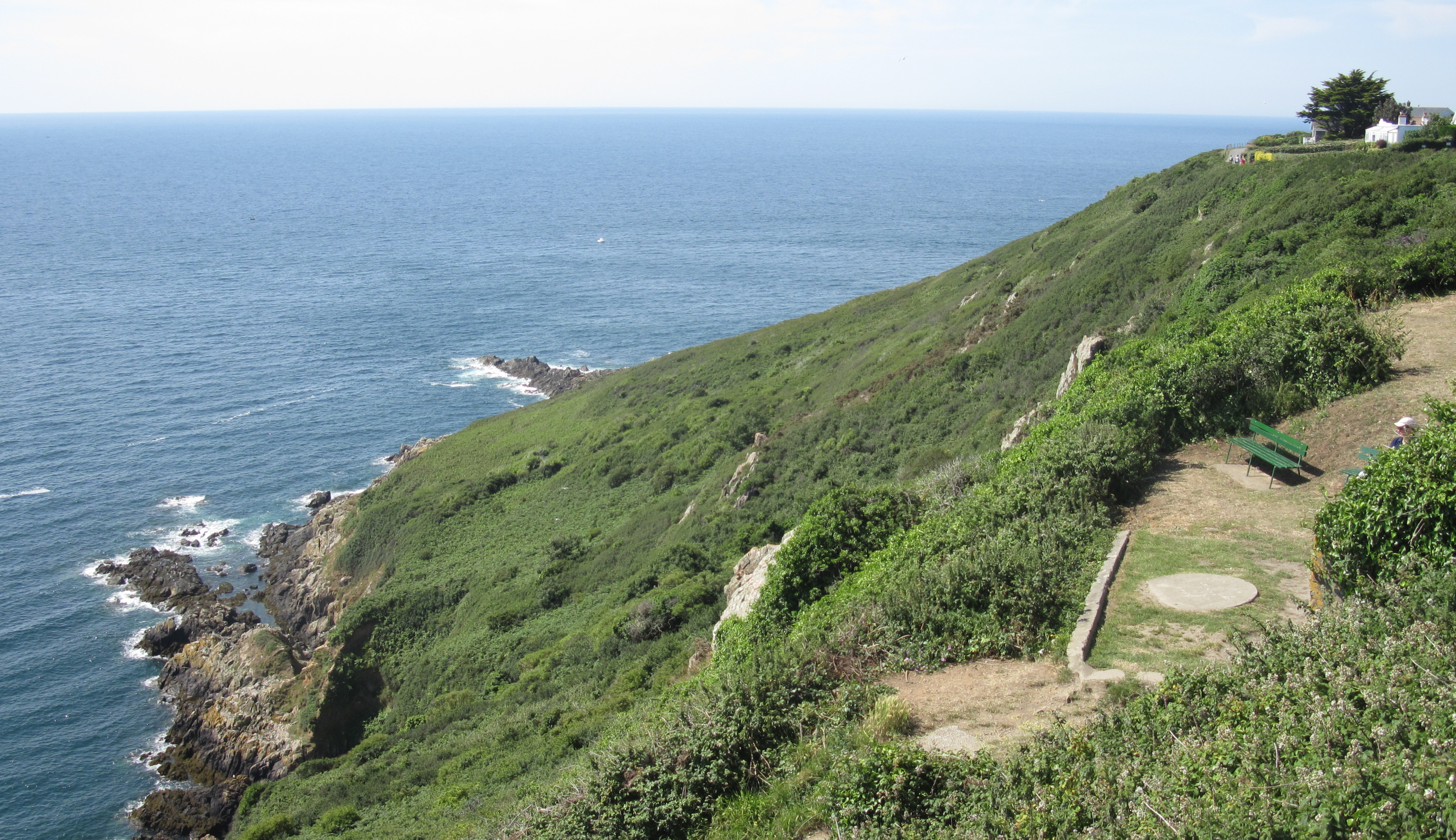
Saint Martin's Point, where Higgins and Hitchins were hanged.

Captain John Higgins was subsequently found guilty of piracy. It was stated that he had lived a “most horrible and detestable” life and had conducted “divers and sundry piracies”. He was sentenced to death and was hanged at St Martin's Point, Guernsey.

Robert Hitchins, around fifty years old and a native of Devon, was another member of the surviving crew, but was found to have dedicated his life to piracy and was therefore excluded from the pardon. Hitchins was subsequently sentenced to death and was executed at Saint Martin’s Point alongside Higgins. His body was left hanging in chains as a warning to others.

== See also ==
- List of shipwrecks in the Channel Islands
- Castle Cornet
- Piracy
