= German trawler V 603 Carsten =

History
- Name: Carsten (1923–48); Thon (1948–54)
- Owner: L. Janssen & Co. (1923–39); Kriegsmarine (1939–45); Unknown (1945–54)
- Port of registry: (Weimar Republic) Wesermünde, Germany (1923–33); (Nazi Germany) Wesermünde, Germany (1933–39); Kriegsmarine (1939–45); France (1945–54)
- Builder: G. Seebeck AG, Wesermünde-Geestemünde
- Yard number: 438
- Launched: June 1923
- Completed: July 1923
- Commissioned: 22 September 1939
- Identification: Fishing boat registration PG 342 (1923–39); Code Letters KSBL (1923–34); Code Letters DEZI (1934–43); Pennant Number V 705 (1939–43); Pennant Number V 603 (1943–45)
- Fate: Scrapped 1954

General characteristics
- Class & type: Fishing vessel (1923–39, 1945–54); Vorpostenboot (1939–45)
- Tonnage: 258 GRT, 98 NRT
- Length: 40.13 m (131 ft 8 in)
- Beam: 7.09 metres (23 ft 3 in)
- Depth: 3.25 m (10 ft 8 in)
- Installed power: Triple expansion steam engine, 53nhp
- Propulsion: Single screw propeller
- Speed: 10 knots (19 km/h)

Carsten was a German fishing trawler which was built in 1923. She was requisitioned by the Kriegsmarine during the Second World War. She was used as a Vorpostenboot. She was allocated to France post-war, and was renamed Thon in 1948. She was scrapped in 1954.

== Description ==
The ship 40.13 m (131 ft 8 in) long, with a beam of 7.09 metres (23 ft 3 in). She had a depth of 3.25 m (10 ft 8 in). She was assessed at 258 GRT, 98 NRT. She was powered by a triple expansion steam engine, which had cylinders of 32 centimetres (12 5/8 in), 52 centimetres (20 1/2 in) and 84 centimetres (33 1/16 in) diameter by 59 centimetres (23 3/8 in) stroke. The engine was built by G. Seebeck AG., Wesermünde-Geestemünde, Germany. It was rated at 53 nhp. It drove a single screw propeller. It could propel the ship at 10 knots (19 km/h).

== History ==
Carsten was built as yard number 439 by G. Seebeck AG., Wesermünde-Geestemünde, Germany. She was launched in June 1923 and completed in August. Owned by the L. Janssen & Co., her port of registry was Wesermünde. She was allocated the Code Letters KSBL, and the fishing boat registration PG 342. In 1934, her Code Letters were changed to DEZI.

On 22 September 1939, Carsten was requisitioned by the Kriegsmarine. Designated as a vorpostenboot. She was allocated to 7 Vorpostenflotille as V 705 Carsten. On 1 July 1943, she was reallocated to 6 Vorpostenflotille as V 603 Carsten. On 26 April 1944, V 606 Fladengrund was sunk in the Bay of Biscay by a Royal Air Force Handley Page Halifax aircraft with the loss of 21 of her 38 crew. V 603 Carsten rescued the survivors. On 7 May 1945, she was declared a prize of war and allocated to France. Her name was changed to Thon in 1948. She was scrapped in 1954.
