= Alderney Society Museum =

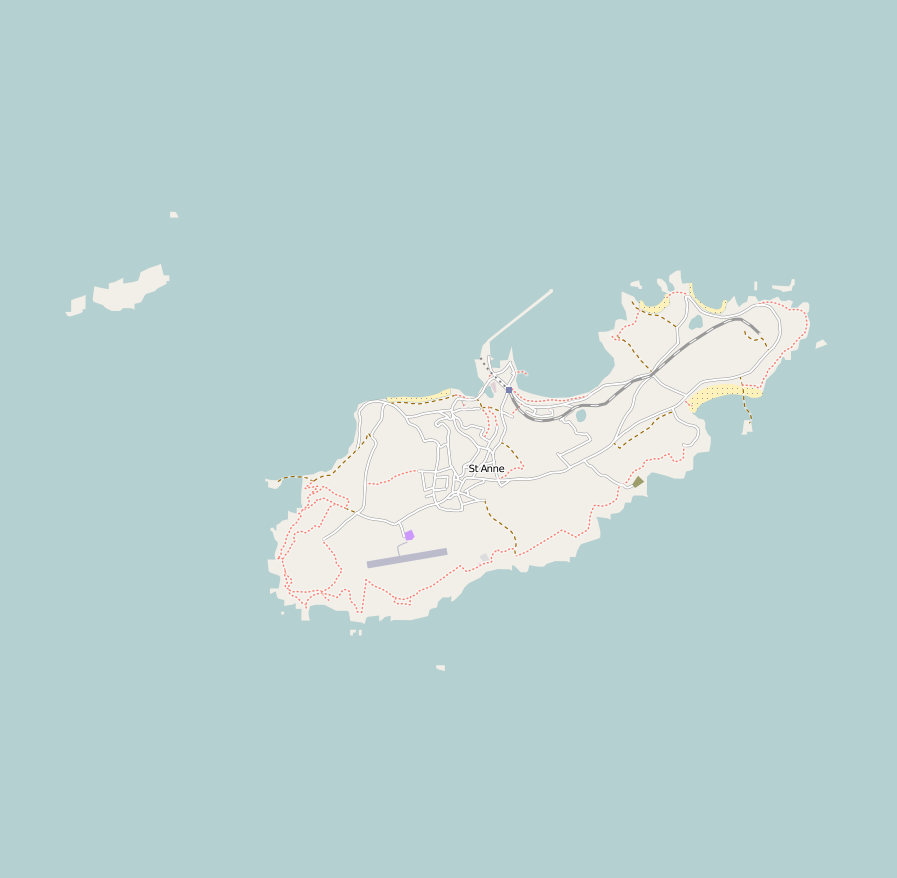
- Location in Alderney
- Established: 1966
- Location: St Anne, Alderney
- Coordinates: 49.713333°N 2.206944°W
- Type: General history and naval museum
- Website: http://www.alderneysociety.org/museum.php

Alderney Society Museum is the only museum in Alderney in the Channel Islands. Located in the Old School House on the High Street in central St Anne, the museum is run and funded by the Alderney Society as one of its many projects. The museum is made up of five gallery spaces: the Main Gallery, the Issue Room of 1946, The Natural History Room, The Maritime Gallery and the upstairs Temporary Exhibition Gallery.

The museum exhibits fully trace the history of the island from the Stone Age through to modern day. The museum acts as an object store, an island archive and a public access museum and the collection is therefore broad. Included in the museum collection are rare island maps, plans and charts, lists of British Regiments stationed in Alderney since 1732, old court records, the 1940 Census of Alderney, and many rare artefacts.

Exhibitions in the museum are varied with recent temporary exhibition including Andy Goldsworthy's Alderney Stones Project, the 1850 sketches of Sophia Guille and plans from the National Archives Kew of the Victorian fortifications in Alderney.

The Alderney Society Museum also collaborates with other museums in loaning exhibits. One recent example included the June 2009 through December 2009 loan of pieces from the Alderney Elizabethan Shipwreck, such as cannonballs, breastplate, helmet, and tobacco pipes, to the Guernsey Museums & Galleries in Saint Peter Port, Guernsey.

== History ==
The museum is housed in the Old School House, next to the old church of St. Anne which is not in use. It adjoins the oldest island cemetery where the old clock tower can be seen at the museum entrance. A plaque on the wall above the entrance states in French that the public school was built and founded by Jean Le Mesurier, governor of the island in 1790. Outside the museum is an old yellow telephone box and post box.

The museum is administered by the Alderney Society who established the museum in 1966 with the purpose of creating "an organisation dedicated to the historical, environmental and scientific promotion of the Island of Alderney". It was first opened in the basement of the Island Hall, however this location proved unsuitable for the type and quantity of objects and papers donated to the museum, the States of Alderney offered the use of the old St. Anne's Public School building for what is termed as a "peppercorn rent", since there was dearth of funds to meet expenses for running a museum. Volunteers pitched in to refurbish the new museum premises for the formal opening held in 1970.

In 1993, the museum was officially fully registered with the Museums, Libraries and Archives Council and in 1999 the museum was a recipient of the Museums and Galleries' Gulbenkian Award for "most outstanding achievement" presented by Prince Charles. Today the museum has achieved full accreditation by the MLA.

== Holdings ==
The museum has over 18,000 holdings related to the history, archaeology and natural history of Alderney. The museum displays exhibit items of social history, military history, the evacuation of the island in 1940 and the subsequent occupation by German troops. Some of the most notable items include plans and drawings of the construction of the Alderney Breakwater, built between 1847 and 1864. The 1852 George S. Reynolds' lithograph is part of the Alderney Breakwater group of documents. Holdings are as diverse as 1940 census papers, cinerary urns, dulcie cups, and curry powder bottles. There are also church and government documents, as well as land and cemetery registers. Materials that document Alderney customs, folk life, genealogy, geology, and the island's natural history are part of the holdings.

One of the larger collections pertains to the Elizabethan Wreck, many artefacts from this important discovery are on display in Gallery 2.
