= Pierres de Lecq =

Group of uninhabitable rocks

Coordinates: 49°17′N 2°12′W

Les Pierres de Lecq
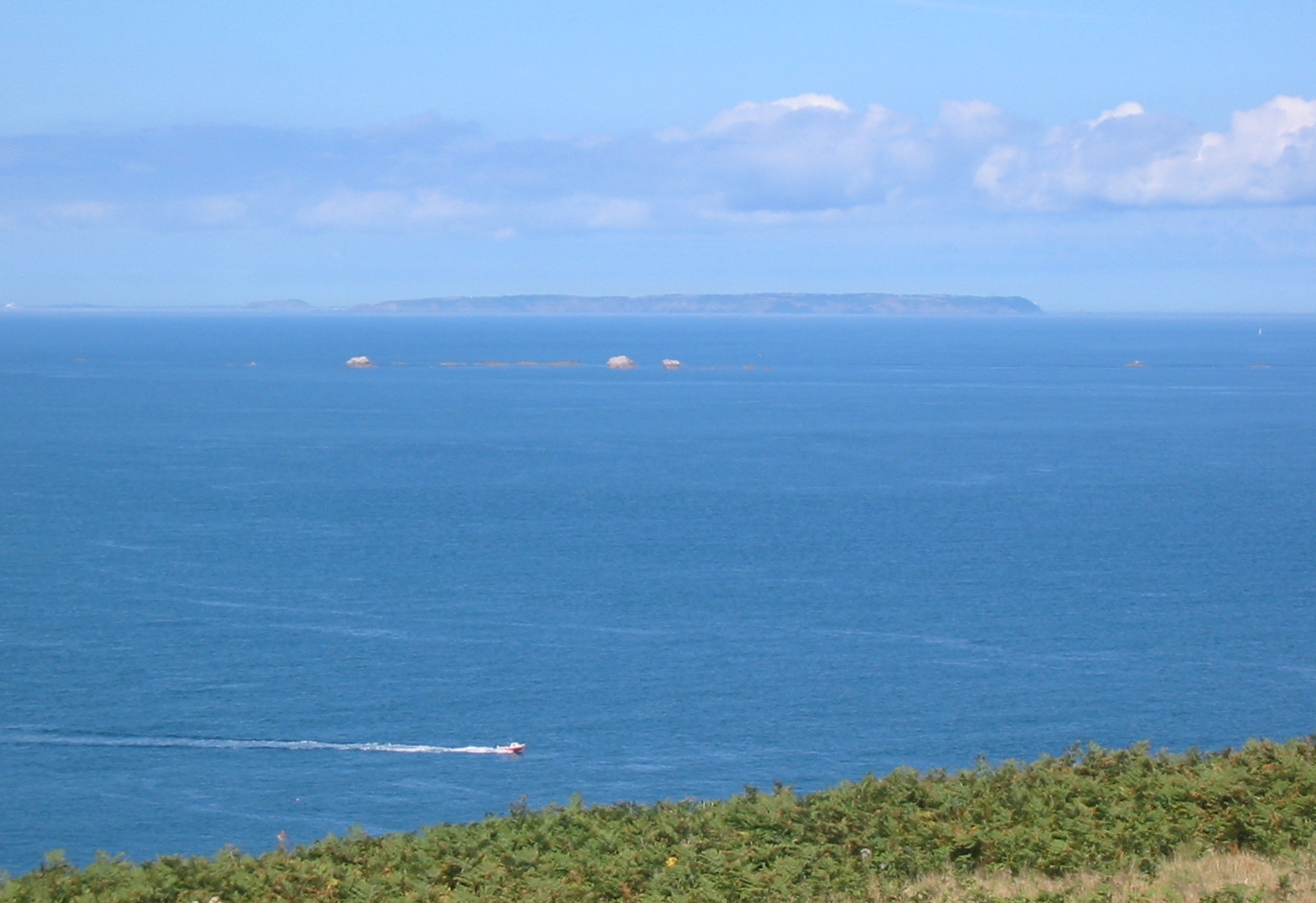
- The Pierres de Lecq (or Paternosters) at high tide seen from Jersey looking towards Sark. The three rocks visible are La Vouêtaîthe, La Grôsse, and L'Êtaîthe.

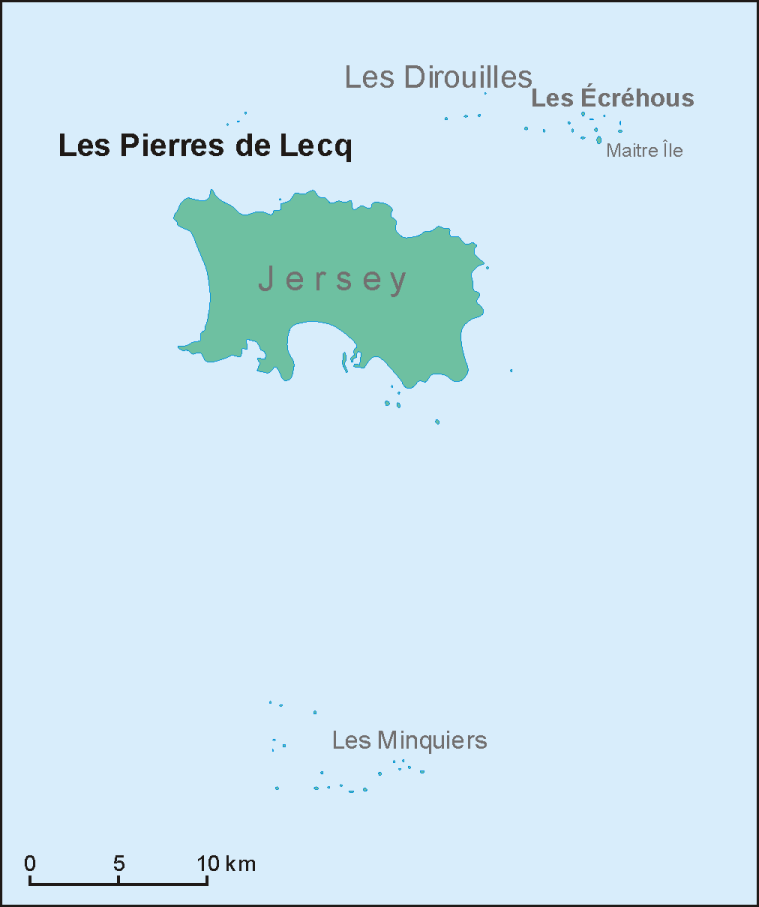
- Location of Les Pierres de Lecq

Ramsar Wetland
- Official name: Les Pierres de Lecq
- Designated: 2 February 2005
- Reference no.: 1457

Les Pierres de Lecq (French pronunciation: [pjɛʁ də lɛk]; Jèrriais: Les Pièrres dé Lé) or the Paternosters are a group of uninhabitable rocks in the Bailiwick of Jersey between Jersey and Sark, 6 km (3.7 mi) north of Grève de Lecq in Saint Mary, and 22.4 km (13.9 mi) west of the Cotentin Peninsula in Normandy. Only three or four of the rocks remain visible at high tide: L'Êtaîthe (the eastern one), La Grôsse (the big one) and La Vouêtaîthe (the western one). The area has one of the greatest tidal ranges in the world, sometimes being as much as 12 m (40 ft).

The name Paternosters is connected with a legend relating to the colonisation of Sark in the 16th century. According to this legend a boatload of women and children was wrecked on the reef and their cries can still be heard from time to time in the wind. Superstitious sailors would say the Lord's Prayer when passing the rocks, hence the name Paternosters.

The rocks are considered to form a biogeographical boundary between a cold and a warmer part of the ocean. Together with the diverse geology of the area and the differences in wave exposure of the different parts, this creates a diverse range of habitats and considerable biodiversity. The variety of algal assemblages support a range of invertebrate species and provides a nursery area for many fish species. Among the fish for which this area is important are the European sea sturgeon, the short-snouted seahorse and the Atlantic salmon. The rocks have been listed as a Ramsar site and support a variety of small cetaceans including dolphins.

== Names of the rocks ==
The rocks all have individual names, listed here in Jèrriais:

- L'Êtchièrviéthe
- La Rocque du Nord
- L'Êtaîse or L'Êtaîthe
- Lé Bel
- Lé Longis
- La P'tite Mathe
- La Grôsse (Great Rock)
- La Grand' Mathe
- La Greune dé Lé, or La Bonnette
- La Greune du Seur-Vouêt
- L'Orange
- La Vouêtaîse, La Vouêtaîthe, or La Vouêt'rêsse
- La Cappe
- La Douoche
- Lé Byi
- La Rocque Mollet
- L'Êtché au Nord-Vouêt
- La Galette
- La Briarde
- La Sprague
- La Niêthole Jean Jean or Lé Gouoillot
