= Asterix (shipwreck) =

Sunken Gallo-Roman merchant vessel

History

Roman Empire
- Name: Asterix
- Namesake: Asterix the Gaul (modern nickname)
- Launched: 3rd century AD
- In service: c. AD 280
- Out of service: c. AD 280
- Fate: Caught fire and foundered in St Peter Port harbour, Guernsey, c. AD 280. Discovered 25 December 1982, 49°27′25″N 2°31′50″W

General characteristics
- Class & type: Romano-Celtic
- Type: Merchant vessel
- Length: 22 to 25 m (72 to 82 ft)
- Beam: 6 m (20 ft)
- Decks: 1
- Propulsion: Single mast with square sail

Asterix was a Gallo-Roman merchant vessel that sank in Saint Peter Port Harbour. Guernsey around AD 280. Discovered in 1982 by local diver Richard Keen, it is the largest and most complete sea-going Roman shipwreck outside the Mediterranean.

Following an excavation and a 12-year conservation process at the Mary Rose Trust in Portsmouth the timbers were returned to Guernsey in 2015. They are currently managed by Guernsey Museums and on display for the public to see.

== History ==
=== Construction and loss ===
The vessel was a Romano-Celtic merchant ship built entirely of oak. It featured a frame-first assembly, meaning the internal skeleton was constructed before the outer planking. The vessel also had a flat bottom, allowing the vessel to beach for unloading in tidal areas without formal harbours.

Around AD 280 the ship caught fire while at anchor in the mouth of what is now St Peter Port harbour and foundered shortly after. The fire ironically helped preserve the wreck: the ship's cargo of pitch melted during the fire and settled into a solid mass that held the lower hull together and preserved it for nearly 1,700 years.

=== Discovery ===
The wreck was discovered on Christmas Day 1982 by diver Richard Keen. Keen noticed large timbers poking out of the seabed which had been recently exposed by the powerful propeller wash of modern car ferries. Before its identification some timbers had even been collected by harbour maintenance staff and used for firewood.

The vessel was nicknamed Asterix after a boy who visited the wreck asked if it was Asterix's ship, which was a popular French comic book series.

== Excavation and conservation ==
Following its discovery the wreck was identified as being under immediate threat of erosion, as the powerful propeller wash from modern car ferries was actively eroding the site. The project was directed by Dr Margaret Rule, who had previously led the raising of the Mary Rose in 1982. Divers from a local club worked with archaeologists to lift the hull piece-by-piece between 1984 and 1986.

Initial preservation of the wreck began in Guernsey, where the timbers were soaked in water to remove the salt. In 1999, the States of Guernsey sent the timbers to the Mary Rose Trust in Portsmouth for conservation. Over 13-years, the wood was soaked in polyethylene glycol to prevent cracking as it dried and the timbers were freeze-dried to remove moisture.

The conservation process was completed in 2011 and Asterix was returned to Guernsey in January 2015. The timbers were placed in a climate-controlled building near Fort Grey Shipwreck Museum. There is a viewing window that allows the public to see the wreck.
