= German trawler V 606 Fladengrund =

History
- Name: Fladengrund
- Namesake: Fladengrund
- Owner: Norddeutsche Hochseefischerei (1923–39); Kriegsmarine (1939–44)
- Port of registry: (Weimar Republic) Wesermünde, Germany (1924–33); (Nazi Germany) Wesermünde, Germany (1933–39); Kriegsmarine (1939–44)
- Builder: G. Seebeck AG, Wesermünde
- Yard number: 418
- Launched: May 1923
- Completed: June 1923
- Commissioned: 22 September 1939
- Out of service: 26 April 1944
- Identification: Fishing boat registration PG 340 (1923–39); Code Letters KRBT (1924–34); Code Letters DEZH (1934–44); Pennant Number V 708 (1939–44); Pennant Number V 606 (1944)
- Fate: Bombed and sunk

General characteristics
- Type: Fishing trawler (1924–39); Vorpostenboot (1939–44)
- Tonnage: 258 GRT, 98 NRT
- Length: 40.13 m (131 ft 8 in)
- Beam: 7.09 metres (23 ft 3 in)
- Depth: 3.25 m (10 ft 8 in)
- Installed power: Triple expansion steam engine, 53nhp
- Propulsion: Single screw propeller
- Speed: 10 knots (19 km/h)
- Armament: 1 x 88mm cannon, various 20mm guns

Fladengrund was a German fishing trawler which was built in 1923. She was requisitioned by the Kriegsmarine during the Second World War. She was used as a Vorpostenboot. She was sunk by a British aerial attack in April 1944.

== Description ==
The ship 40.13 m (131 ft 8 in) long, with a beam of 7.09 metres (23 ft 3 in). She had a depth of 3.25 m (10 ft 8 in). She was assessed at 258 GRT, 98 NRT. She was powered by a triple expansion steam engine, which had cylinders of 32 centimetres (12 5/8 in), 52 centimetres (20 1/2 in) and 84 centimetres (33 1/16 in) diameter by 60 centimetres (23 5/8 in) stroke. The engine was built by G. Seebeck AG., Wesermünde, Germany. It was rated at 53 nhp. It drove a single screw propeller. It could propel the ship at 10 knots (19 km/h).

== History ==
Fladengrund was built as yard number 418 by G. Seebeck AG., Wesermünde, Germany. She was launched in May 1923 and completed in June. Owned by the Norddeutsche Hochseefischerei, her port of registry was Wesermünde. She was allocated the Code Letters KRBT, and the fishing boat registration PG 340. In 1934, her Code Letters were changed to DEZH.

On 22 September 1939, Fladengrund was requisitioned by the Kriegsmarine. Designated as a vorpostenboot. She was allocated to 7 Vorpostenflotille as V 708 Fladengrund. She was armed with an 88mm cannon and a number of 20mm guns. On 8 February 1944, she was reallocated to 6 Vorpostenflotille as V 606 Fladengrund. On 26 April 1944, Fladengrund was bombed and sunk in the Bay of Biscay west of Saint-Nazaire, Loire-Inférieure and south of Belle Île, Finistère, France (47°06′N 2°58′W) in an attack by a Royal Air Force Handley Page Halifax aircraft with the loss of 21 of her 38 crew. Survivors were rescued by V 603 Carsten.
