= SS Pickhuben (1923) =

Cargo steamship

History
- Name: Pickhuben (1923–45); Empire Condicote (1945–46); Grimsnes (1946–47); Tungenes (1947–61)
- Owner: HM Gehrckens (1923–45); Ministry of War Transport (1945); Ministry of Transport (1945–46); Norwegian Government (1946–47); Det Stavangerske Dampskibsselskab (1947–61)
- Operator: HM Gehrckens (1923–45); Ministry of War Transport (1945); Walford Lines Ltd (1945–46); Norwegian Government (1946–47); Det Stavangerske Dampskibsselskab (1947–61)
- Port of registry: (Weimar Republic) Hamburg (1923–33); (Nazi Germany) Hamburg (1933–45); (United Kingdom) London (1945–46); (Norway) Oslo (1946–47); (Norway) Stavanger (1947–61)
- Builder: Union Giesserei
- Launched: 1923
- Identification: code letters RFCG (1928–34); call sign DHTE (1934–45); UK official number 180666 (1945–46); call sign GNQQ (1945–46); call sign LLTY (1946–61)
- Fate: Scrapped

General characteristics
- Type: cargo ship
- Tonnage: 999 GRT, 529 NRT
- Length: 230.7 ft (70.3 m)
- Beam: 35.6 ft (10.9 m)
- Depth: 13.4 ft (4.1 m)
- Decks: 1
- Installed power: 121 NHP
- Propulsion: 1 × triple-expansion engine; 1 × screw

Pickhuben was a cargo steamship that was built in 1923 by Union Giesserei, Königsberg for German owners. She was seized by the Allies in May 1945 at Lübeck, Germany, passed to the Ministry of War Transport (MoWT) and renamed Empire Condicote. She was passed to the Norwegian Government in 1946 and renamed Grimsnes. In 1947 she was sold and renamed Tungenes. She was scrapped in Belgium in 1961.

== Description ==
Union Giesserei, in Königsberg in East Prussia (now Kaliningrad in Russia), built the ship in 1923. She was 230.7 feet (70.3 m) long, with a beam of 35.6 feet (10.9 m) a depth of 13.4 feet (4.1 m). Her tonnages were 999 GRT and 529 NRT. She had a single screw, driven by a three-cylinder triple-expansion engine. The engine was built by Union Giesserei, and rated at 121 NHP.

== History ==
Pickhuben was built for HM Gehrckens, Hamburg. Her code letters were RFCG. By 1934 her wireless telegraph call sign was DHTE. In May 1945 the Allies seized Pickhuben at Lübeck. She was passed to the MoWT, who renamed her Empire Condicote and registered her in London. Her United Kingdom Official Number was 180666, and her cal sign was GNQQ. Walford Lines Ltd managed her for the MoWT.

In 1946 Empire Condicote was allocated to the Norwegian Government, renamed Grimsnes, and registered in Oslo. In 1947 she was sold to Det Stavangerske Dampskibsselskab (English: The Stavanger Steamship Co), Stavanger and renamed Tungenes. She was registered in Stavanger, and her call sign was LLTY. She was scrapped at Zalzate, Belgium in 1961.
