= SS Rhenania =

A number of steamships were named Rhenania, including -

- SS Rhenania (1883), a German cargo ship that was wrecked in 1912
- SS Rhenania (1893), a German cargo ship that sank in 1927
- SS Rhenania (1904), a German cargo liner in service 1904–15
- SS Rhenania (1923), a German cargo ship in service 1923–34
