= Charles Cherrett =

British lighthouse keeper

Charles Henry Cherrett
- Born: 14 September 1901; Gibraltar, United Kingdom
- Died: 1970 (aged 69); Maidstone, Kent
- Occupation: Lighthouse keeper
- Years active: 1920–1966
- Employer: Trinity House
- Television: Rough Sea and Rocks (BBC Interlude)
- Spouse: Sarah Ann Clark (married 1922–1966)
- Children: Several, including David Cherrett

Charles Henry Cherrett (14 September 1901 – 1970), commonly known as Charlie Cherrett, was a British lighthouse keeper who served for Trinity House. He is believed to be one of the longest-serving keepers in the service's history, with a career spanning 46 years.

== Early life ==
Cherrett was born on 14 September 1901 at the Europa Point Lighthouse in Gibraltar, where his father, Charles Cherrett, was then stationed. He came from a multi-generational family of keepers; his father and uncle both served in the Trinity House Service, and his ancestors originated from Dorset before settling in London in the mid-19th century.

== Career ==
Cherrett's career with Trinity House began in 1920 and lasted until his retirement in 1966. During Cherrett's career he was stationed at several lighthouses off Land's End including Wolf Rock Lighthouse off Cornwall. He was also stationed at Longships Lighthouse and Bishop Rock Lighthouse throughout his career.

=== Wolf Rock Lighthouse incident ===
On 18 December 1944, Cherrett was stationed at Wolf Rock Lighthouse alongside two other keepers, serving as acting keeper in charge. The lighthouse was very unpopular with lighthouse keepers as they were often left isolated for weeks or even months due to poor weather conditions. In the early hours of the morning he reported hearing a loud metallic scraping sound outside the lighthouse. On investigating he observed a German U-boat, U-1209, grounded on the rocks below. This was as a result of the Navigational Chief Petty Officer and the Commanding Officer starting a heated argument as to whether the U-Boat was too close to the rocks. Cherrett subsequently notified Trinity House in Penzance reporting that the submarine had run aground and was then washed back into the sea by heavy swell before being driven onto the rocks again. Later reports from the lighthouse stated that U-1209 had slipped free once more and was proceeding westwards. A man was also seen standing on the submarine's conning tower.

U-1209 sustained significant damage to its stern and began taking on water. Hans Georg Claussen, the engineering officer, remained below decks in order to scuttle the submarine and was forced out through the conning tower immediately before the vessel sank. He had been the most popular officer on board according to the surviving crew. Although Claussen was rescued by allied vessels he later died from his injuries at a hospital in Penzance and was buried in the town. Nine men died in the sinking, all members of the German Navy.

=== Media appearance ===
In 1953 Cherrett featured in the BBC television interlude "Rough Sea and Rocks," where he discussed his service at Wolf Rock Lighthouse and the 1944 sinking of the German submarine U-1209. The interlude was shot off Pulpit Bay, near Portland Bill in Dorset, and was broadcast on 10 December 1953.

== Personal life ==
Cherrett married Sarah Ann Clark in 1922 in Kinson, Dorset. He had several children, including David Cherrett. He retired in 1966 as one of the longest-serving keepers in Trinity House's history, with a career spanning 46 years.

Cherrett died in late 1970 in Maidstone, Kent, England.

== See also ==
- List of lighthouses in the United Kingdom
