= Les Hanois Lighthouse =

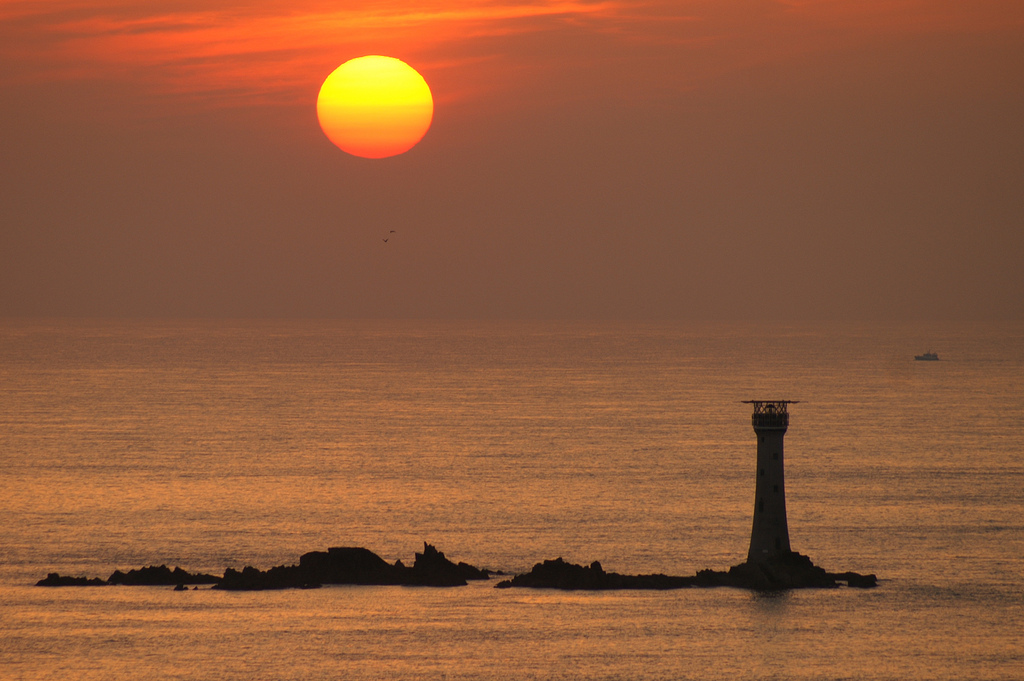
- Les Hanois Lighthouse during a volcanic ash sunset (April 2010)
- Location: On Les Hanois, Guernsey
- Coordinates: 49°26′06.2″N 2°42′08.4″W

Tower
- Constructed: 1862
- Construction: granite tower
- Automated: 1996
- Height: 36 m (118 ft)
- Shape: tapered cylindrical tower with balcony, lantern, keeper's quarter and helipad above the lantern
- Markings: white tower
- Power source: solar power
- Fog signal: Sounding twice every 60 seconds (range 2 nmi (3.7 km))

Light
- Focal height: 33 m (108 ft)
- Lens: 4th order rotating optic
- Intensity: 89,900 candela
- Range: 20 nmi (37 km)
- Characteristic: White group flashing twice, 3.2 seconds apart, every 13 seconds

Les Hanois Lighthouse was constructed between 1860 and 1862 to a design by James Walker, and was first lit on 8 December 1862. It is sited on the rock known as Le Biseau, or Le Bisé, part of the reef Les Hanois 1 mile (1.6 km) north west of Pleinmont where the Trinity House cottages were built. It was erected in response to an increasing number of shipwrecks on the treacherous rocks off the western coast of Guernsey.

== Planning ==
Shipwrecks shortly before the construction included the wreck of the Royal Navy vessel HMS Boreas in 1807 A further wreck in 1816 of Marie Elizabeth, a merchant ship from Copenhagen, at Rocquaine triggered letters and discussions about undertaking a nobel project, Trinity House was contacted and in January 1817 about a possible lighthouse on the Pleinmont cliff top, they wrote back saying a lighthouse was not necessary as the lights on Les Casquets and at Portland were sufficient and a new lighthouse would be confusing and do more harm than good. The Trinity House Brethren appear to have misunderstood the request as these locations are 30 miles (48 km) and 80 miles (130 km) away and neither can be seen from south of Guernsey.

Additional ships were wrecked in 1820, 1834 and 1835, with pressure being exerted on Trinity House, who in 1847 reconsidered the proposal and sent a representative to visit the island. Local shipowners were against a tax to pay for a lighthouse as they knew of the dangers and did not need it. A further wreck in 1848 of Emmanuel carrying timber from Canada to Hull had mistaken the Casquets light for the Portland light and erroneously sailed further south to disaster.

The Rector of Torteval proposed putting a light on the top of the 105 metres (344 ft) (above sea level) church steeple which was considered by Trinity House in 1849 as a possible cheap alternative, but after an inspection, the steeple was found to be unsuitable. Arguments for and against abounded, the Guernsey Chamber of Commerce were against, the Jersey Chamber was for, Trinity House was informed that they did not have jurisdiction to build a lighthouse in Guernsey and that Guernsey had no funds to pay for it. An article appeared in The Times on 15 July 1850 asking about the necessity of a Lighthouse at Pleinmont Point

Trinity House agreed that a lighthouse was necessary and the Bailiff of Guernsey now stepped forward, confirming that the island was not opposed and the precedent of the Casquets lighthouse gave Trinity House the necessary authority but would not consent to a levy or taxation by an English Board. In 1851 the British government agreed to pay for the lighthouse provided Guernsey and Jersey would defray the maintenance costs, subject to a maximum of £900 per annum. Guernsey objected to the cost, proposing to pay just £75p.a.. The House of Commons got involved, reviewing the costs in 1852 and proposed to add a clause to the 1854 Merchant Shipping Bill. Guernsey objected to the proposed removal of their 1204 rights of self taxation and the Privy Council relented and asked what the Channel Islands would contribute, £100 p.a. total was the answer. The impasse was resolved by England stating that they would levy dues on Channel Island ships docking in England, so collecting over £900 per annum. This forced the issue but the cost was reduced when it was decided that Channel Island shipping would in future be treated as coastal shipping, rather than pay the dues at the overseas rate.

== Construction ==
In July 1858 Trinity House inspected the rocks to determine which was practical. A local pilot advised using Le Bisseau rocks as it could be landed on in most sea conditions whereas La Mauve rocks were in a better location. The cost of construction, measured by the number of days it was possible to access the rocks, decided the issue with Le Bisseau chosen.

The design required the light to be 100 ft (30 m) above high water. A width of 32.6 ft (9.9 m) at the base, 17 ft (5.2 m) at the waist and 20.5 ft (6.2 m) at the light. This dictated 24,542 cubic feet (695.0 m^{3}) of masonry would be needed, weighing 2,500 long tons (2,500 t). A circular staircase would serve six rooms, one on each level.

The tapered granite tower, painted white, is notable in terms of novel lighthouse engineering because it was the first to be built with all the stones dovetailed together, locking each stone with the vertically and horizontally adjacent stones, thereby making the construction a single solid mass. The cement mortar in the joints formed between stone faces locks the dovetails so that the stones cannot be separated without being broken. This method, used for the first time at the Hanois Lighthouse, became the pattern adopted for subsequent lighthouses built on sea rocks.

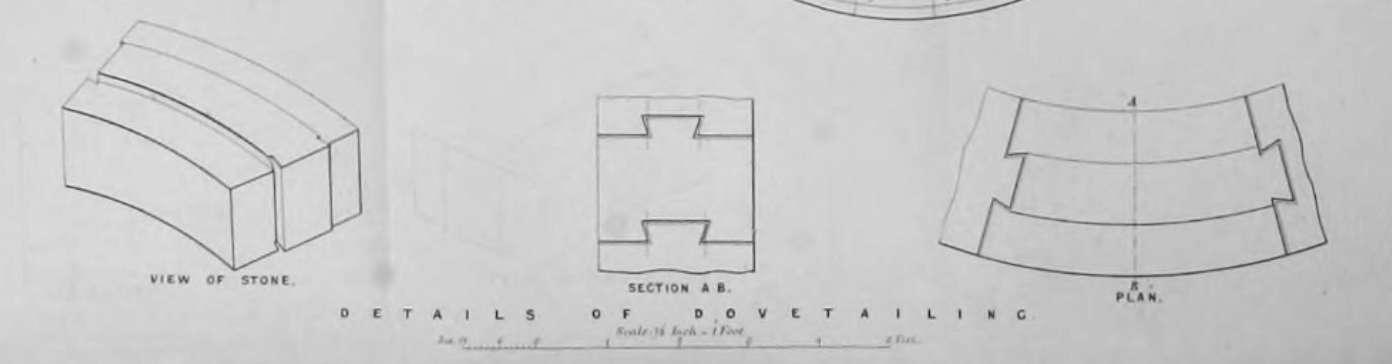
Detail of dovetailed blocks on the system first used at Les Hanois lighthouse

[The dovetailing system first adopted at Les Hanois] consists in having a raised dovetailed band 3 inches in height, on the top bed and one end joint of each stone; a corresponding dovetailed recess is cut in the bottom bed and end joint of the adjoining stones, with just sufficient clearance for the raised band to enter it freely in setting; immediately the cement has hardened, the stone is so firmly secured to the adjoining stones as to be nearly equal in strength to solid granite. This system of dovetailing also affords great protection to both horizontal and vertical joints against the wash of the sea when the work is first set.

The cement was a quick drying type invented by John Smeaton.

The resident engineer was William Douglass, the 28-year-old son of Nicholas Douglass, an engineer (who had suggested using the dovetail joint for the stones) and brother of James Douglass. The lighthouse was constructed in Cornish granite rather than stone from Guernsey. Cornish masons were employed to dress the stone on the castle pier in Saint Peter Port Harbour, with the finished numbered stones taken by barge to the site. Construction workers on the lighthouse worked in gangs of 16 and when resting were accommodated in Fort Grey. The men being employed to build the lighthouse keepers cottage at Portelet when the weather was bad.

The foundation stone was laid on 14 August 1860 by the Bailiff of Guernsey with several Jurats also present as well as a crowd on a flotilla of local boats. By March 1862 the tower was 60 feet (18 m) high. In August they were ready for the light which arrived in October however completion was slightly delayed by bad weather, with the light lit for the first time in late November. Final commissioning was in late 1863, the cost being £25,296.

== Light and bell ==
Chance Brothers built the light using 672 pieces of glass. The lens was designed by James Chance and inspected by Michael Faraday who gave it his unqualified approbation. It was a sixteen-sided revolving catadioptric optic of the first-order, which displayed a red flash every forty-five seconds and was visible at 13 nmi (24 km). The red colour was achieved through fitting a ruby glass chimney over the multi-wick oil lamp at the centre of the lens.

A 7 cwt fog bell was provided, sounding every minute, however it was not very effective.

== Tower ==
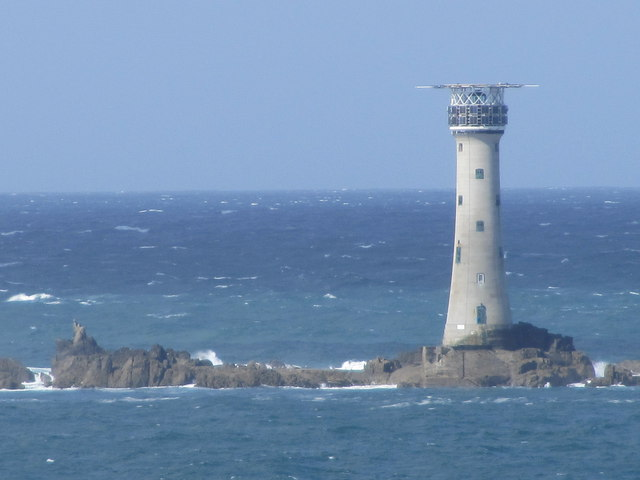
Les Hanois Lighthouse in 2015

The lower room contained fuel oil, water and provisions, with a toilet. Once the coal stove was replaced a shower room was added. The next was the oil room, later the winch room. Room 3 contained the food and explosives, necessary as a fog signal before the electric fog signal was installed, it later became a generator room for the diesel generators. Room 4 was the kitchen and living room with small windows. Level 5 was the bedroom with "banana" bunks. Room 6 was the watch room which housed the engine control panels and later radios. The next stairs led to the original lantern room, later to become a diesel engine room, compressor room for the fog horn and battery room, above which is the lens.

== Purpose ==
Its role is to provide a mark warning of the reefs and rocks to the west of Guernsey and providing a position fix for vessels entering the Channel Traffic Separation Scheme.

The reef Les Hanois includes, besides Le Bisé and numerous small rocks, the following major rocks: Le Grand Hanois, Le Petit Hanois, La Percée, Round Rock and La Grosse Rocque.

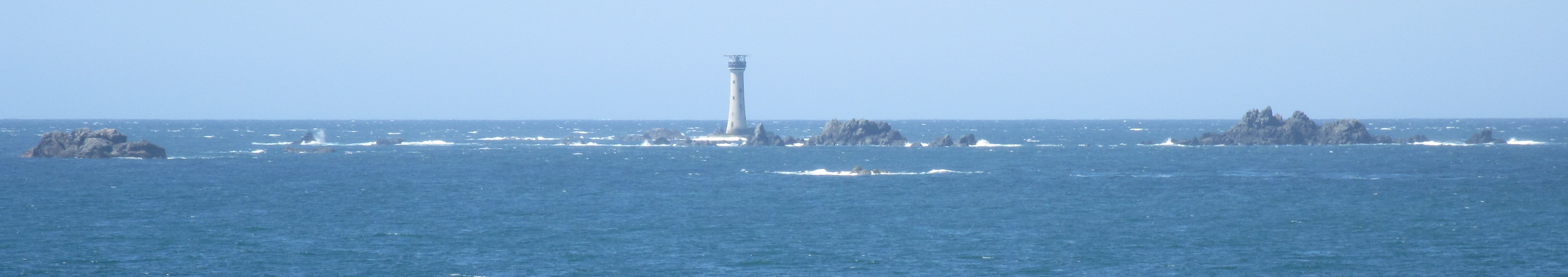
View of the lighthouse and Les Hanois reef

== 20th century ==
In 1905 the colour of the light was altered from red to white; it continued to flash once every 45 seconds, but now shone more powerfully. The fog bell was still in use, sounding once every 15 seconds when required. From 1915 an explosive fog signal was sounded in addition to the bell: it consisted of a gun-cotton charge electrically fired. If needed it would be let off every 2 1/2 minutes, each charge had to be hung outside the tower from a jib, which was wound up to avoid the blast breaking the glass.

During World War II the light was kept operational until the keepers and their families were evacuated on 21 June 1940. German forces occupied the lighthouse in July 1940 but it was not lit again until September 1945, after the liberation, because the optic had been slightly damaged by gunfire. The Trinity House cottages at Portelet were occupied by troops during the war.

In 1964 the light was electrified, a filament lamp replacing the paraffin vapour burner previously in use. After more than a hundred years of service, the old optic was removed from the tower and presented by Trinity House to the new Pilkington Glass Museum (Pilkington Brothers having gained a controlling interest in the firm of Chance Brothers, the original manufacturers). In its place a smaller (fourth-order) rotating optic was installed, which displayed two white flashes every five seconds. A fog horn, sounded by compressed air, was also installed as part of the upgrade.

The helicopter pad on top of the lighthouse was built in 1979.

The lighthouse was demanned in January 1996 following automation. At the same time it was converted to work from solar power. This required a slowing down of the optic, changing the character of the light, so as to reduce the power requirement while maintaining the 20 nmi (37 km) range required. As part of the automation process, the compressed-air fog signal was replaced by an electric emitter.

== Present day ==
The current light signals two white flashes every 13 seconds and has a range of 20 nmi (37 km). The funding of the lighthouse has now reversed, with Guernsey bearing the maintenance cost and Trinity House paying a nominal £1,000 per annum.

== See also ==
- List of lighthouses in the Channel Islands
