= La Longue Rocque =

Standing stone in Guernsey, UK

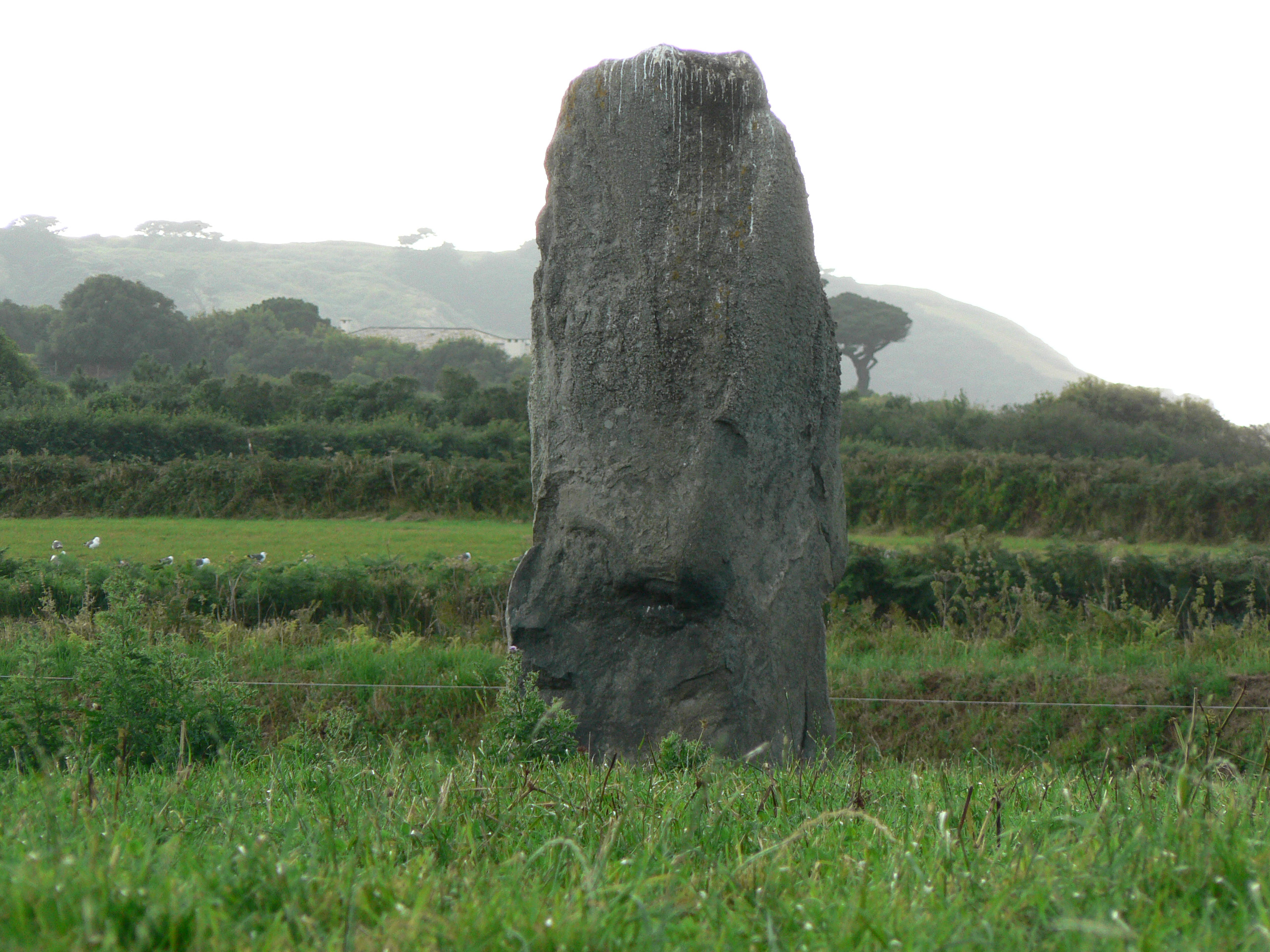
- The menhir in 2007
- Interactive map of La Longue Rocque
- 49.44456°N 2.63540°W
- Type: Menhir
- Location: Saint Peter, Guernsey

History
- Built: c. 2250 BC

Site notes
- Material: Granite
- Height: 3.5 m (11 ft)

La Longue Rocque is the tallest megalithic menhir in the Channel Islands. A granite block 3.5-metre (11 ft) tall and extending a further metre (3 ft) below the ground, it stands in a field next to Les Paysans road in Guernsey.

It is believed that it was erected between 3000-1500 BC.

== Description ==
The menhir is located at 49° 26′ 40.6″ N / 02° 38′ 07.4″ W. Excavation in 1894 found it to be trigged with one stone and embedded in gravel. It is estimated to weigh five tons. It is surrounded by a field which still bears crops annually.

On the north facing edge of the menhir is an area worn smooth by touching or ‘rubbing’ over the millennia. This may be due to ‘ritual’ rubbing on the stone, or, more likely, the stone being used as a ‘scratching’ post for livestock over the 6500 years since its erection. Place names surrounding these fields suggest other menhirs that have disappeared due to farming, building and superstition.

== Folklore ==
Youngsters in Guernsey were told stories of the ‘Grande Pierre’ as La Longue Rocque is sometimes called. The block was said to be a giant's cricket bat. A giant round rock (the ball) can be found near the back of the Imperial Hotel at Rocquaine.
