= List of places in Guernsey =

This is the complete list of the, 10 towns in Guernsey.

- Saint Peter Port
- Vale
- Saint Sampson
- Saint Martin
- Saint Saviour
- Saint Andrew
- Saint Peter Port
- The Forest
- Torteval
