= HMCS Montreal (K319) =

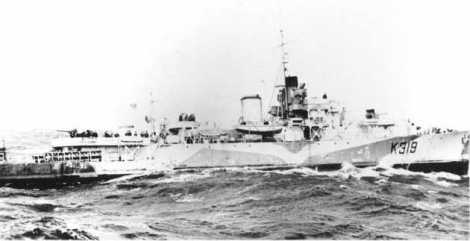
- HMCS Montreal

History

Canada
- Name: HMCS Montreal
- Namesake: Montreal, Quebec
- Ordered: October 1941
- Builder: Canadian Vickers Ltd., Montreal
- Laid down: 23 December 1942
- Launched: 12 June 1943
- Commissioned: 12 November 1943
- Decommissioned: 15 October 1945
- Identification: Pennant number:K 319
- Honours and awards: Atlantic 1944-45
- Fate: Sold 1947 and scrapped

General characteristics
- Class & type: River-class frigate
- Displacement: 1,445 long tons (1,468 t; 1,618 short tons); 2,110 long tons (2,140 t; 2,360 short tons) (deep load)
- Length: 283 ft (86.26 m) p/p; 301.25 ft (91.82 m)o/a
- Beam: 36.5 ft (11.13 m)
- Draught: 9 ft (2.74 m); 13 ft (3.96 m) (deep load)
- Propulsion: 2 x Admiralty 3-drum boilers, 2 shafts, reciprocating vertical triple expansion, 5,500 ihp (4,100 kW)
- Speed: 20 knots (37.0 km/h); 20.5 knots (38.0 km/h) (turbine ships)
- Range: 646 long tons (656 t; 724 short tons) oil fuel; 7,500 nautical miles (13,890 km) at 15 knots (27.8 km/h)
- Complement: 157
- Armament: 2 × QF 4 in (102 mm) /45 Mk. XVI on twin mount HA/LA Mk.XIX; 1 × QF 12 pdr (3 in (76 mm)) 12 cwt /40 Mk. V on mounting HA/LA Mk.IX (not all ships); 8 × 20 mm guns QF Oerlikon A/A on twin mounts Mk.V; 1 × Hedgehog 24 spigot A/S projector; up to 150 depth charges

HMCS Montreal was a River-class frigate that served with the Royal Canadian Navy during the Second World War. She served primarily as an ocean convoy escort in the Battle of the Atlantic. She was named for Montreal, Quebec.

Montreal was ordered in October 1941 as part of the 1942–1943 River-class building program. She was laid down on 23 December 1942 by Canadian Vickers Ltd. at Montreal and launched 12 June 1943. She was commissioned into the Royal Canadian Navy on 12 November 1943 at Montreal.

== Background ==
The River-class frigate was designed by William Reed of Smith's Dock Company of South Bank-on-Tees. Originally called a "twin-screw corvette", its purpose was to improve on the convoy escort classes in service with the Royal Navy at the time, including the Flower-class corvette. The first orders were placed by the Royal Navy in 1940 and the vessels were named for rivers in the United Kingdom, giving name to the class. In Canada they were named for towns and cities though they kept the same designation. The name "frigate" was suggested by Vice-Admiral Percy Nelles of the Royal Canadian Navy and was adopted later that year.

Improvements over the corvette design included improved accommodation which was markedly better. The twin engines gave only three more knots of speed but extended the range of the ship to nearly double that of a corvette at 7,200 nautical miles (13,300 km) at 12 knots. Among other lessons applied to the design was an armament package better designed to combat U-boats including a twin 4-inch mount forward and 12-pounder aft. 15 Canadian frigates were initially fitted with a single 4-inch gun forward but with the exception of HMCS Valleyfield, they were all eventually upgraded to the double mount. For underwater targets, the River-class frigate was equipped with a Hedgehog anti-submarine mortar and depth charge rails aft and four side-mounted throwers.

River-class frigates were the first Royal Canadian Navy warships to carry the 147B Sword horizontal fan echo sonar transmitter in addition to the irregular ASDIC. This allowed the ship to maintain contact with targets even while firing unless a target was struck. Improved radar and direction-finding equipment improved the RCN's ability to find and track enemy submarines over the previous classes.

Canada originally ordered the construction of 33 frigates in October 1941. The design was too big for the shipyards on the Great Lakes so all the frigates built in Canada were built in dockyards along the west coast or along the St. Lawrence River. In all Canada ordered the construction of 60 frigates including ten for the Royal Navy that transferred two to the United States Navy.

== War service ==
After working up in the vicinity of Halifax, Montreal joined the Mid-Ocean Escort Force convoy escort group C-4 in March 1944. On 3 September 1944, she rescued 33 survivors from the Fjordheim, a Norwegian merchant that had been torpedoed north of Ireland. She remained with the group until late September 1944 when she joined escort support group EG 26, forming at Derry. She rescued the survivors of U-1209 that had wrecked southwest of Land's End on 17 December 1944.

Montreal remained in the waters surrounding the United Kingdom until March 1945. During this time she was based out of Plymouth and Portsmouth. In mid-March 1945, she returned to Canada and on 31 March she began a tropicalization refit in preparation for service in the southern Pacific Ocean. The refit was completed at Shelburne, Nova Scotia in August and Montreal performed several duties around Halifax until 15 October 1945, when she was paid off. She was placed in reserve at Bedford Basin and remained there until 1947 when she was sold for scrap and taken to Sydney, Nova Scotia.
