= Pleinmont-Torteval =

Coordinates: 49.4411°N 2.6411°W

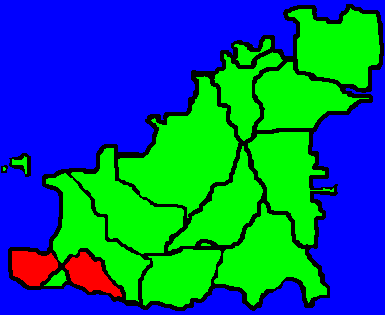
Map showing the two sections of Torteval

Pleinmont-Torteval is an area in Guernsey. It is part of the parish of Torteval, which is split into two, by St. Pierre du Bois. The other part is often called just "Torteval" to distinguish it from "Pleinmont-Torteval".
