= Wolf Rock Lighthouse =

Lighthouse off Land's End, England

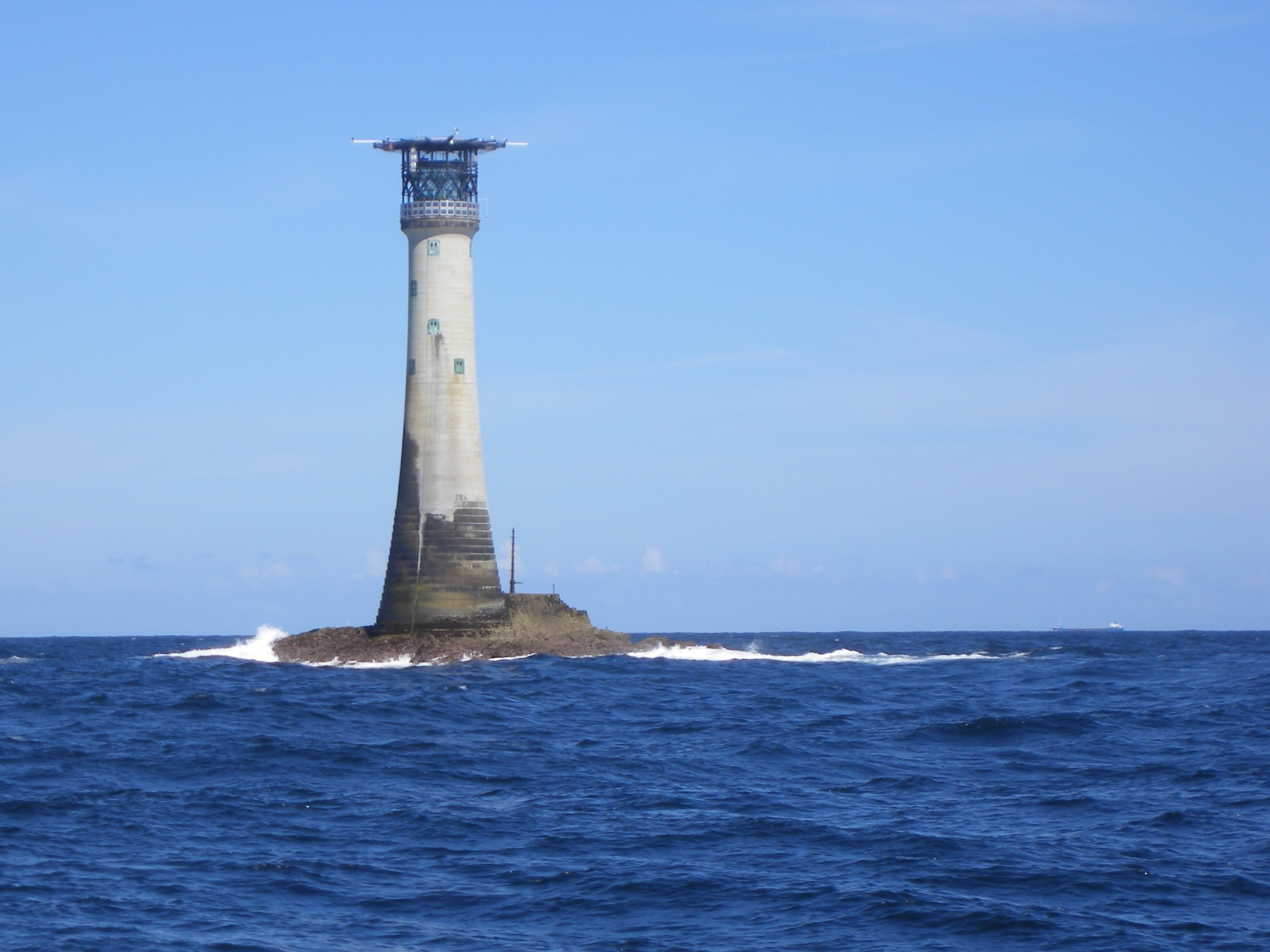
- Location: Wolf Rock, Cornwall, Wolf Rock, United Kingdom
- Coordinates: 49°57′N 5°49′W

Tower
- Constructed: 1869
- Built by: James Walker
- Construction: granite (tower), concrete (foundation)
- Automated: 1988
- Height: 41 m (135 ft)
- Shape: tapered cylindrical tower with lantern and helipad on the top
- Markings: Unpainted (tower), black (lantern)
- Operator: Trinity House
- Fog signal: 1 blast every 30s.
- Racon: T

Light
- Focal height: 34 m (112 ft)
- Lens: 1st order catadioptric rotating (original), 4th order (250mm) catadioptric rotating (current)
- Intensity: 17,100 candela
- Range: 16 nmi (30 km; 18 mi)
- Characteristic: Fl W 15s

Wolf Rock Lighthouse is on the Wolf Rock (Cornish: An Welv, meaning the lip), a single rock located 18 nautical miles (33 km; 21 mi) east of St Mary's, Isles of Scilly and 8 nautical miles (15 km; 9.2 mi) southwest of Land's End, in Cornwall, England, United Kingdom. The fissures in the rock are said to produce a howling sound in gales, hence the name.

The lighthouse is 41 metres (135 ft) in height and is constructed from Cornish granite prepared at Penzance, on the mainland of Cornwall. It took eight years, from 1861 to 1869, to build due to the treacherous weather conditions that can occur between the Cornish mainland and the Isles. The light is visible from Land's End by day and night. It has a range of 23 nautical miles (43 km; 26 mi) and was automated in 1988. The lighthouse was the first in the world to be fitted with a helipad. It is located on the tiny, 130 m^{2} skerry-type rock.

The name "Wolf Rock" is a corruption of the Cornish language An Welv, or "The Lip".

== Geology ==
Situated between mainland Cornwall and the Isles of Scilly, the Wolf Rock is a small plug of phonolitic lava formed during the early part of the Cretaceous period and is unlike any rock exposed on the Cornish mainland.

== History ==
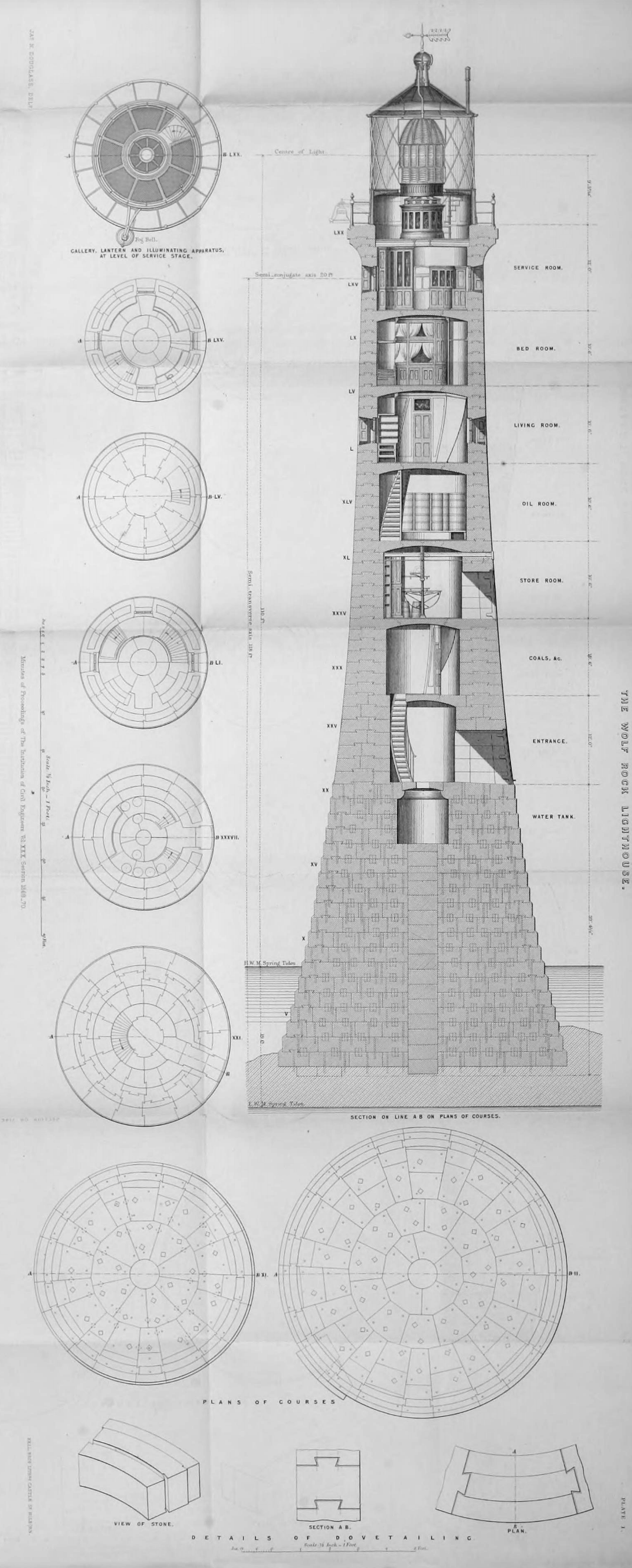
Engineering drawing showing the structure of Wolf Rock Lighthouse.

Gabrielle of Milford Haven was wrecked on the Wolf Rock in 1394. Her cargo, worth £1000, was washed ashore in Cornwall and collected as wreck.

=== Earlier seamarks ===
In 1790, the Corporation of Trinity House received a patent of the Crown to build a lighthouse on Wolf Rock. The rights were leased to a Lt. Henry Smith; but (such were the technical challenges of the venture) the project was transferred to the less exposed location of the Longships, where construction of a lighthouse proceeded. On Wolf Rock, rather than a lighthouse, Lt. Smith went on to build a 6.1 m (20 ft) high wrought iron daymark, 10 cm (4 in) in diameter and supported by six stays. A metal effigy of a wolf was placed on top; but by 1795 the daymark was washed away.

In the late 1830s John Thurburn built a beacon, which was completed on 15 July 1840, and in November of that year was wrecked by storms when the pole and globe on its top were washed away and not replaced until 1842 but they were once more washed away in a storm on 9 October 1844. Trinity House engineer James Walker constructed a 4.3 m (14 ft) high cone-shaped beacon, which took five years to build. Made of iron plates and filled with concrete rubble this was completed in 1848, it can still be seen next to the lighthouse.

=== Construction of the lighthouse ===
In April 1860, Trinity House applied to the Board of Trade for funds to build a lighthouse on Wolf Rock. Approval was given and Walker, as engineer-in-chief, drew up designs for a 117 ft (36 m) masonry tower, tapering in diameter from 41 ft 8 in (12.70 m) at the base to 17 ft (5.2 m) at the top. Details of the design followed closely that of other Walker-built lighthouses: the recently completed Bishop Rock and Hanois lights, and the Smalls (which was then nearing completion). While his designs were inspired by Smeaton's third Eddystone Lighthouse, Walker introduced new innovations, not least the use of vertical as well as horizontal dovetail joints (first achieved at Les Hanois at the suggestion of Nicholas Douglass, and likewise incorporated into the design of Wolf Rock).

Nicholas's son James Douglass was appointed as resident engineer, and in July 1861 he arrived (fresh from completing his work as resident engineer for the Smalls lighthouse) and surveyed the rock. The following March work began on excavating the foundations. In October 1862, James Walker died (at the age of 81). James Douglass replaced him as engineer-in-chief to the Trinity House; James's younger brother, William Douglass, then became resident engineer at Wolf Rock. William himself laid the first stone of the new tower on 6 August 1864. Masonry construction was completed on 19 July 1869. The finished tower was topped by a lantern storey manufactured by Chance Brothers of Smethwick to James Douglass's design. The lantern had previously been exhibited at the Paris Exhibition of 1867 as an example of the latest in lantern technology, using curved rather than flat panes of glass and helical rather than straight glazing bars.

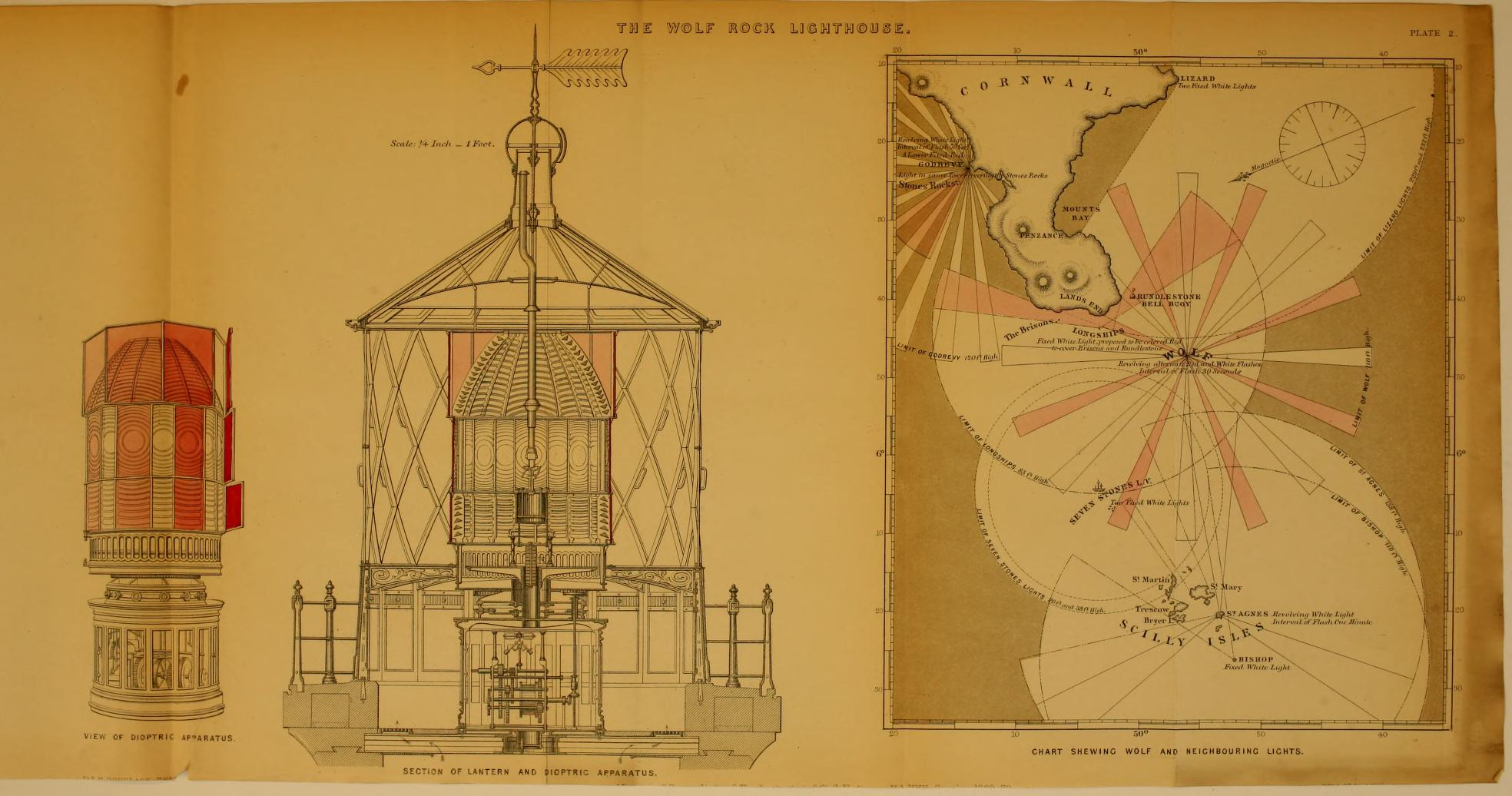
Engineering drawing of the 1869 optic and sectional view of it within the lantern, alongside a chart showing location in relation to other lights.

James Chance of Chance Brothers had designed a large (first-order) rotating multi-panel optic for installation in the tower, 2.58 m (8 ft 6 in) high by 1.73 m (5 ft 8 in) diameter. In order to differentiate the light from the nearby St Agnes lighthouse (which displayed a white light) and from Les Hanois Lighthouse (which displayed a red light) it was resolved that the Wolf Rock light should revolve and flash alternately red and white; in order to achieve the required characteristic it was planned to install 'ruby' coloured panes of glass over half the panels on the optic (with the intervening panels left clear). It was known, however, that the intensity of a light was reduced when shone through coloured glass, so Chance conducted experiments to measure the precise difference. It was concluded that the comparative intensity of clear glass to red was 21 to 9 (i.e. more than double); therefore the red-covered panels on the optic were made wider than the others by the same proportion, in order to maintain an even intensity across the colour-change.

=== Operational summary ===
The light first shone on 1 January 1870; as planned, it displayed "alternate flashes of red and white of equal intensity every thirty seconds". The completed optic (which together with its pedestal stood 20 feet (6.1 m) high) was described by Douglass as "probably the most perfect for the purpose that has yet been constructed"; it continued in use for the next eighty-five years. The optic was rotated by a clockwork drive, that required winding every four hours. A 7-cwt bell, hung from the lantern gallery, was sounded in fog; driven by a separate clockwork mechanism, it rang three times every fifteen seconds.

The Wolf Rock was the site of a hake (Merluccius merluccius) fishery in the 1870s, especially by fishermen from St Ives with 400 employed in October 1879.

In 1904 a more powerful light-source was installed: a Matthews incandescent oil burner replacing the Douglass multi-wick oil burner. At the same time a reed fog signal was installed, which sounded a four-second blast every 30 seconds using compressed air produced by a small steam engine with a coke and coal-fired boiler; it remained in use until the 1960s. (The bell was initially retained for standby use, but was decommissioned in 1906.) The light characteristic was changed in 1906, so that the flash (red or white, alternating as before) was displayed every fifteen seconds rather than every thirty.

In March 1941 the lantern was hit by aerial cannon fire, shattering the glass of the lenses. For a time afterwards the red flash was removed and it simply flashed white, every thirty seconds. The lighthouse was equipped with a radiotelephone in 1941, which greatly improved communications; it came with a petrol-driven generator for recharging its batteries. On 18 December 1944, German submarine U-1209 hit Wolf Rock and was subsequently scuttled with the loss of 9 lives.

In 1955 electrification came to Wolf Rock Lighthouse: in place of the oil lamp a 1 kW tungsten filament lamp was installed, within a new fourth-order catadioptric optic (again made by Chance Brothers); the optic was provided with a new clockwork-driven revolving pedestal. 100V DC power for the light was provided by Crompton Parkinson generators, driven by Ruston-Hornsby diesel motors, which were installed in what had been the coal store. The new optic maintained the same light characteristic as the old, flashing (alternately red and white) every fifteen seconds. It was a four-sided optic, made up of two wide lens panels and two narrow ones (the wider panels being fronted with ruby glass), so that the intensity of the red light would, as before, be equivalent to that of the white. The visible range of the light was 16 nautical miles (30 km; 18 mi). An automatic lamp changer was fitted, including an emergency battery lamp in case the generator sets should fail; but provision was also made for the substitution of a multi-wick oil burner in the event of a complete electrical failure, for which a pressurised paraffin supply system was retained.

In the early 1960s a new diaphone fog signal was installed in place of the old reed fog horn; powered by a pair of Lister diesel compressor sets, it was one of the last diaphone systems to be installed by Trinity House.

In 1972 Wolf Rock became the first lighthouse in the world to be fitted with a helipad; completed the following year, it greatly eased the challenge of getting keepers to and from the lighthouse in heavy seas. Nevertheless, fifteen years later the lighthouse became fully automated: the last keepers left Wolf Rock on 3 June 1987, after which the automation crew took over, remaining on the lighthouse until July the following year, whereupon the automation process was complete. During automation the red colour was removed from the light and the fourth-order optic was adapted so as to display one white flash every fifteen seconds. A more powerful lamp was fitted, which increased the range of the light to 23 nautical miles (43 km; 26 mi). Also, an electric emitter replaced the diaphone fog signal at this time. Fifteen years later the lighthouse was converted to solar power, with photovoltaic cells being installed around the exterior of the helideck support structure.

=== Present day ===
The lighthouse continues in operation. Set within the fourth-order revolving optic, its solar-powered lamp has a range of 16 nautical miles (30 km; 18 mi); it flashes once every 15 seconds and is remotely monitored from the Trinity House Planning Centre in Harwich, Essex.

== MV Mazarine ==
The ro-ro vessel Mazarine grounded near the lighthouse on 10 July 2023, while on a voyage from Ireland to Zeebrugge, Belgium following a loss of power. Managing to clear the rock, Mazarine was initially unable to start the engines and drifted towards Mount's Bay. At around 16:00 a tug provided a tow to Falmouth Bay, where the ship underwent a dive survey and was drydocked for repairs. The hull required extensive repairs on the port side aft in order to close up multiple hull perforations and replace deformed plating.

== Popular culture ==
The Wolf Rock Lighthouse features prominently in the 1925 Dr Thorndyke detective novel The Shadow of the Wolf, by R. Austin Freeman.

== Gallery ==
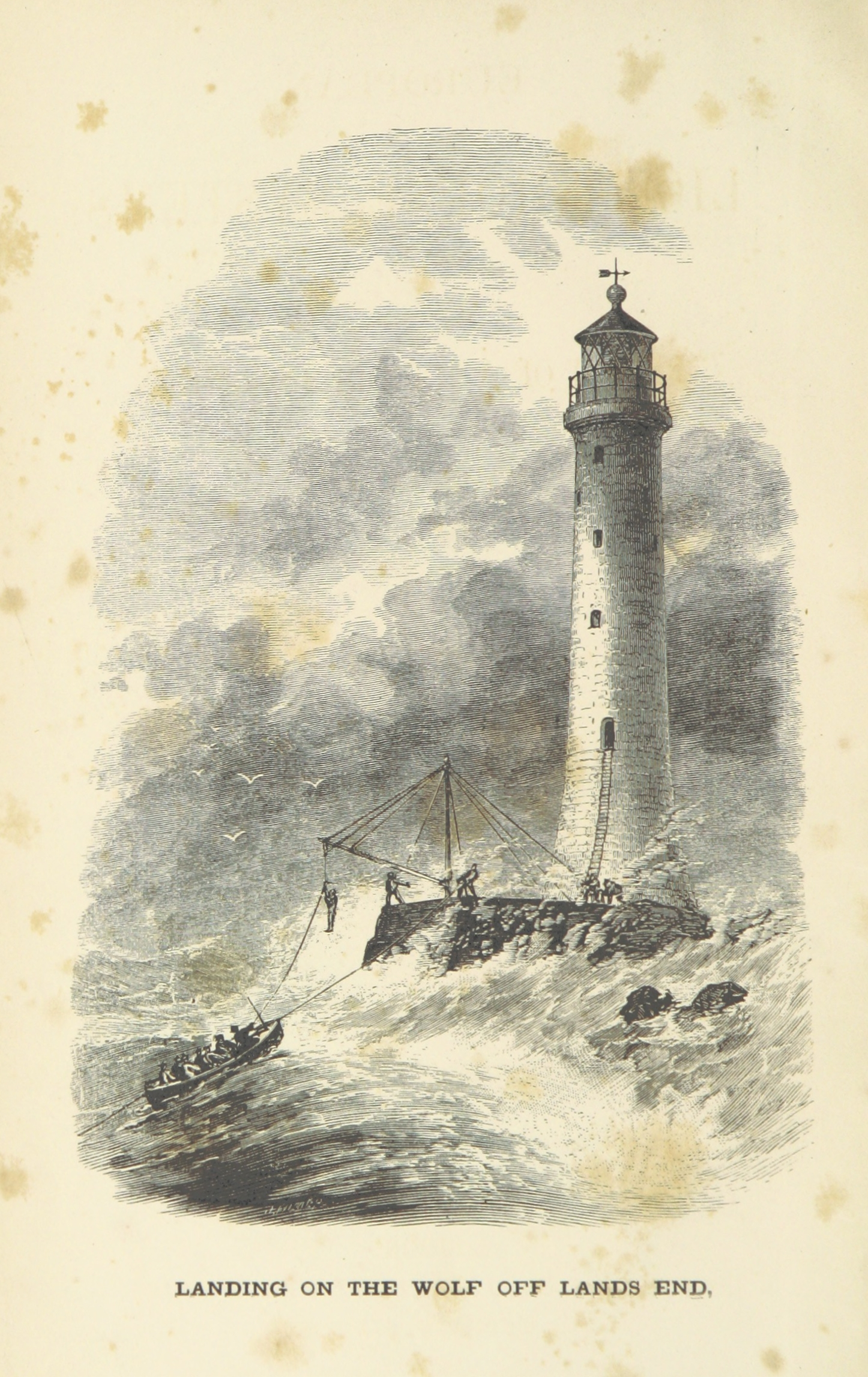
Wolf Rock Lighthouse in 1875

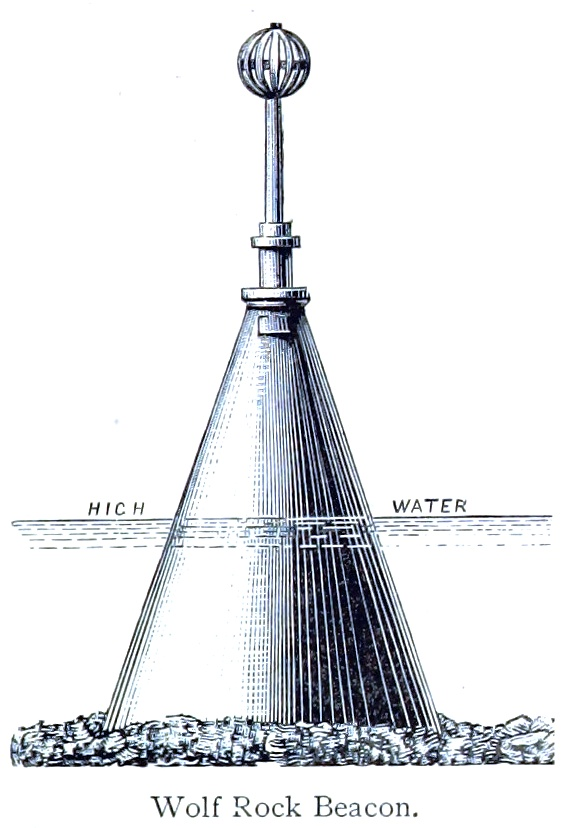
Wolf Rock Beacon, 1884, by E. Price Edwards

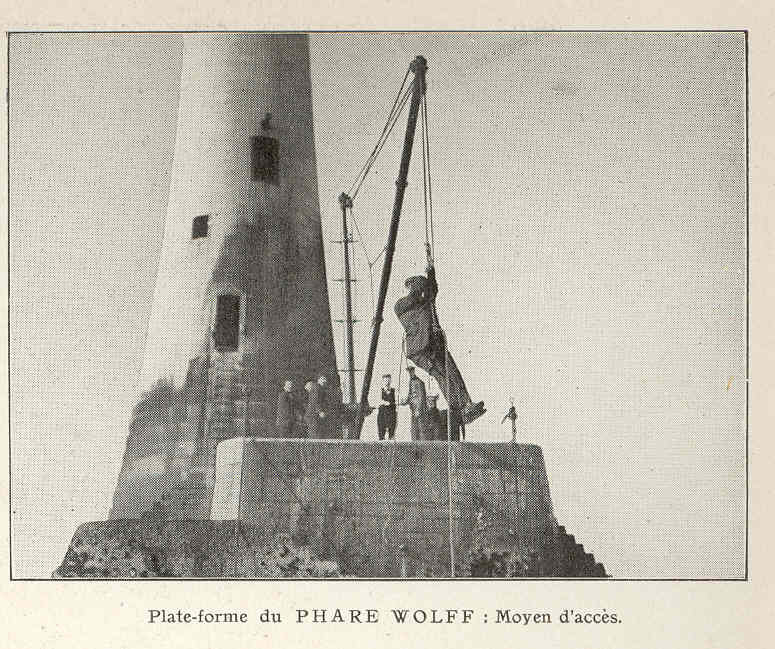
A keeper arriving, c. 1913

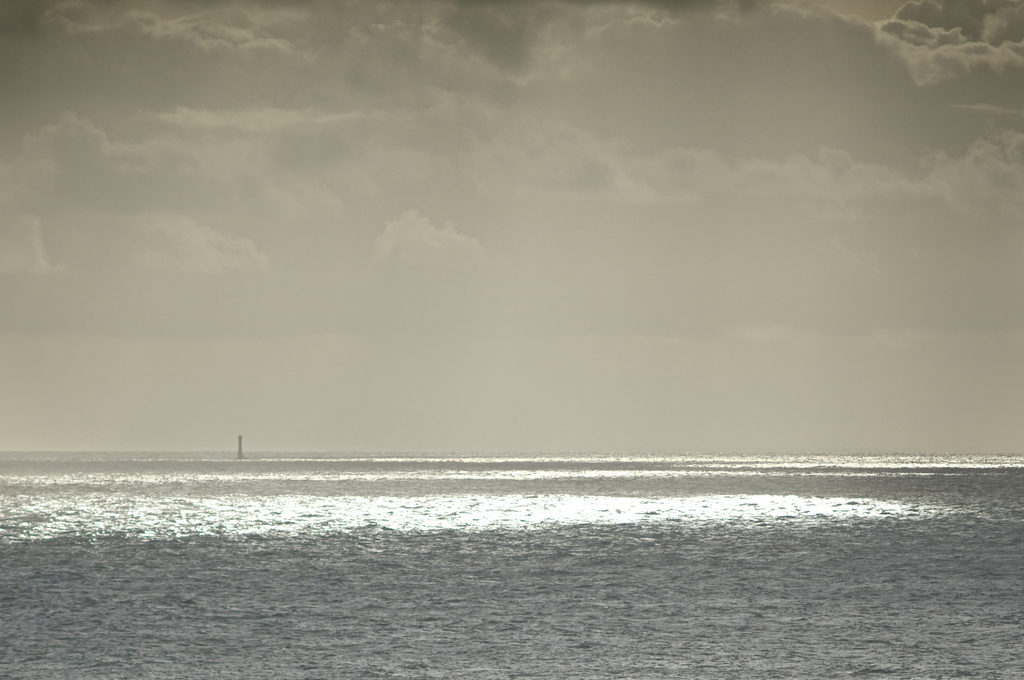
Wolf Rock seen from Land's End

== See also ==
- List of lighthouses in England
