= Fort Grey =

British Martello Tower on Guernesey

Coordinates: 49°26′21″N 2°39′17″W

- Château de Rocquaine

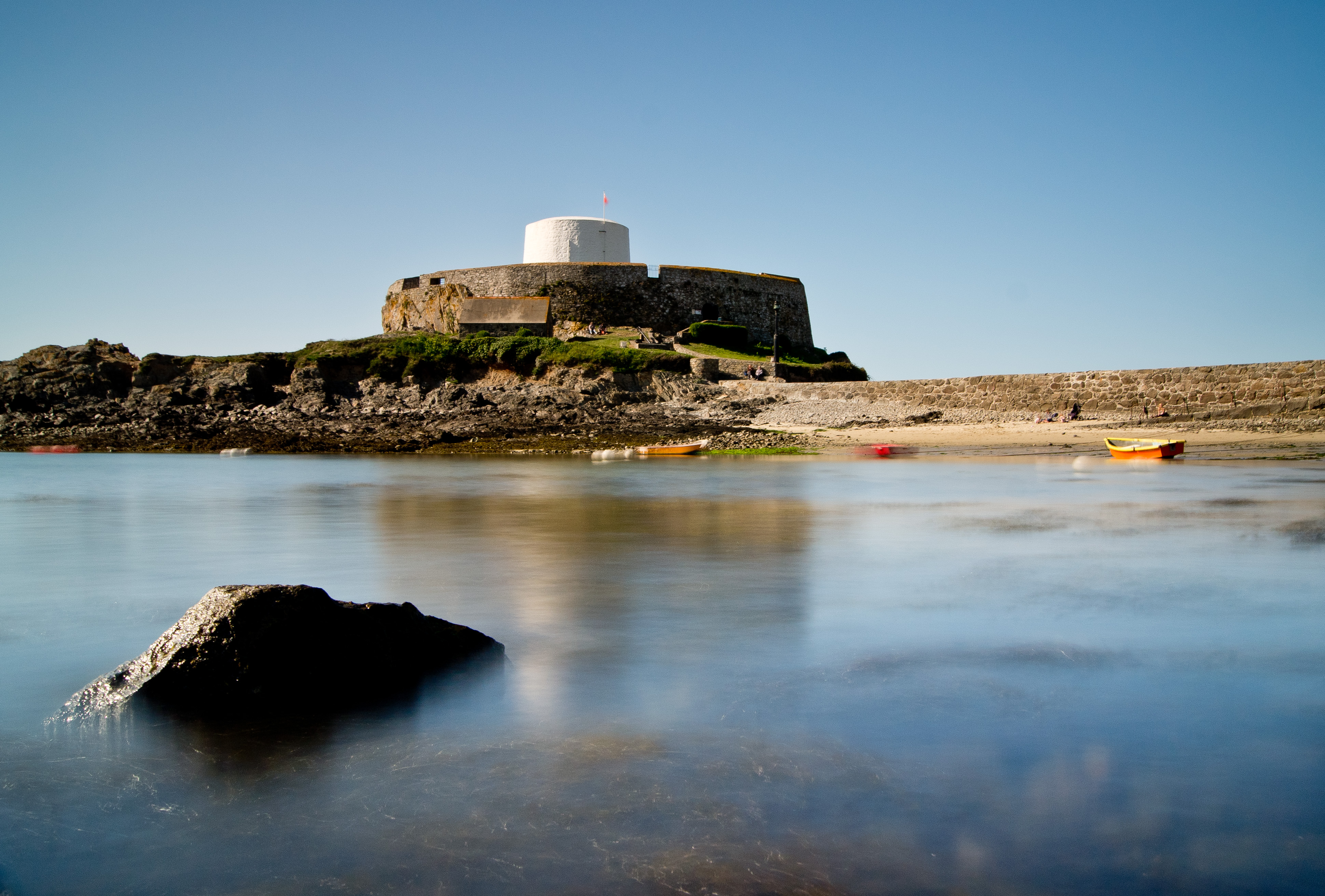
Fort Grey

Fort Grey, colloquially known as the "cup and saucer", is a Martello tower located on a tidal rock in Rocquaine Bay in Saint Peter, Guernsey on the west coast of the island.

== Château de Rocquaine ==
The French name of the rock is the Château de Rocquaine (Castle of Rocquaine); in Guernésiais Châté dé Rocquoïne probably built in the Late Middle Ages, there was a small fort, referred to in the 1620s as used by the militia, not being in a fit state to withstand assault. In the 16th century the site of local witches' Sabbaths and in 1617 there was reported a meeting between a local girl, Isabel Becquet and the devil. Marie de Callais from St Martin, was also convicted for belonging to the coven and burnt at the stake on 17 October 1617.

== Fort Grey ==
The existing fort was built on the remnants of the old Chateau. Its white tower was originally built as a defence by the British in 1804 during the Napoleonic Wars, the builder was a local man, Thomas Henry from Clos du Valle The fort was named after Charles Grey, 1st Earl Grey, who was Governor of Guernsey from 1797 to 1807. It was made one of three locations in the island where a warning gun would be fired in case of invasion.

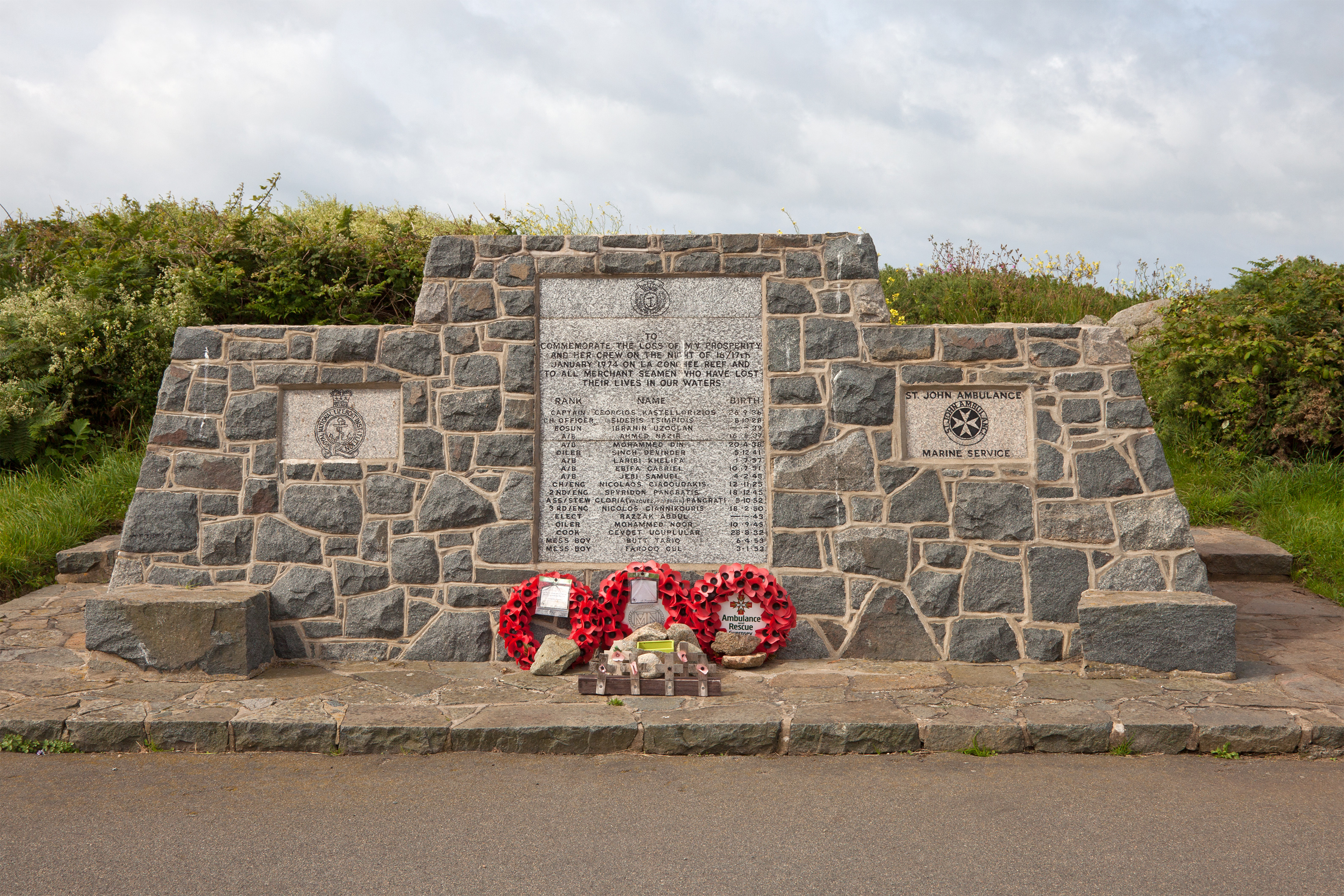
Monument to the loss of MV Prosperity on the night of 16/17 January 1974

The Fort Grey tower, like the other two Guernsey Martello towers, Fort Saumarez and Fort Hommet, was intended as a keep for the battery in which it was placed. The Guernsey Martellos are smaller than the British towers, with the Fort Saumarez and Fort Hommet towers being smaller than the Fort Grey tower. (Note: Forts Hommet and Saumarez have a diameter of 34 feet and stand 17 feet; Fort Grey has a diameter 36 feet and stands 26 feet high.) Each mounted a 24-pounder carronade on the roof to protect the battery. Fort Saumarez and Fort Hommet also have exterior staircases up to the second floor.

The connection between St Peter Port and the fort were improved with an upgrade of the road to military standard around 1808, using money arising from the sale of land from the reclaimed Braye du Valle.

== WW2 ==
The War Office in London sold Fort Grey to the States of Guernsey in 1891 for £185. During the German occupation of the Channel Islands in World War II, the Germans occupied the fort, as they did most of the other fortifications in Guernsey. The fort was given the name Widerstandsnest Graur Turm (resistance nest Gray Tower) armed with a mobile 3.7 cm Pak 36 anti tank gun and machine guns.

== Museum ==
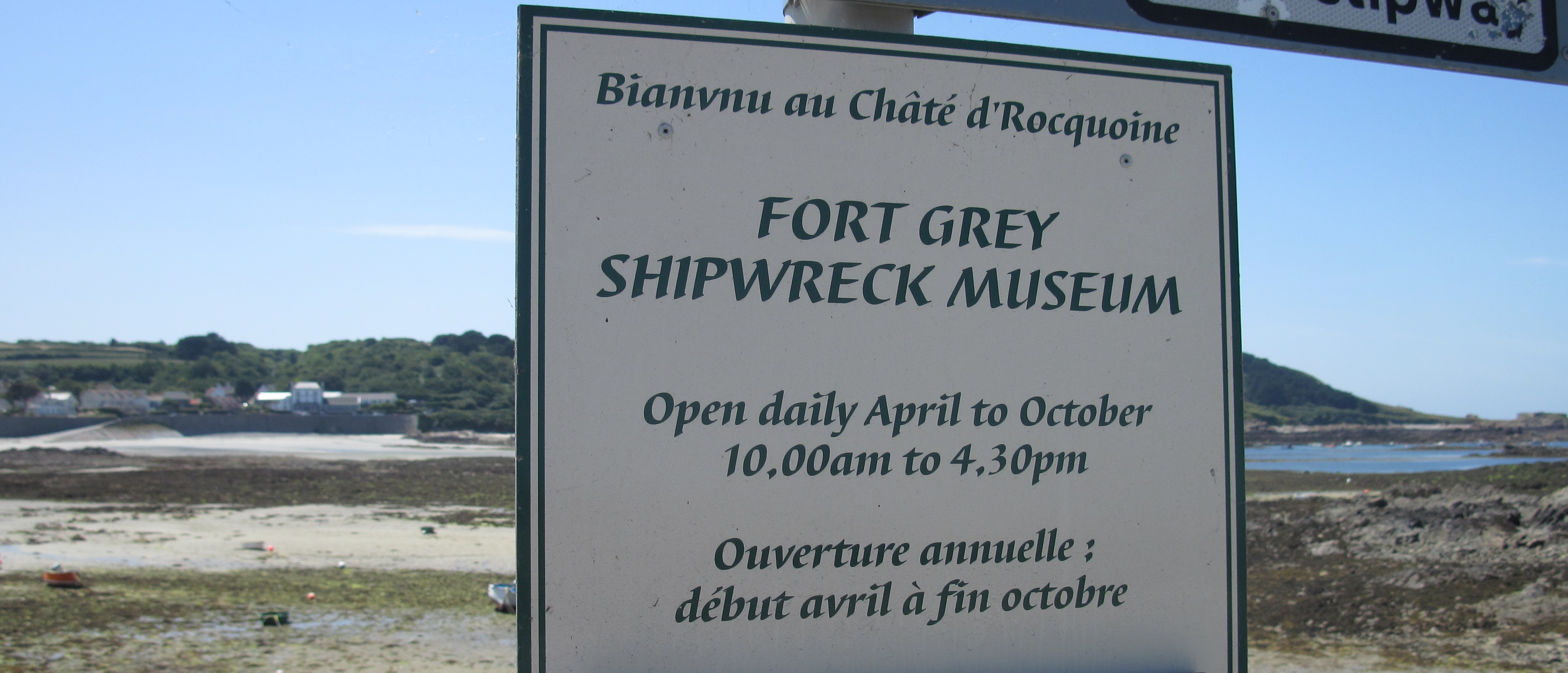
Museum sign

More recently Fort Grey has been adapted for other more peaceful uses and now operates as a local shipwreck museum, housing a number of items of marine salvage from famous wrecks, including the MV Prosperity and Elwood Mead. The items also include a cannon from HMS Boreas that points towards the nearby Hanois rocks where Boreas sank in 1807 with the loss of her captain, at least half her crew, and possibly the captain's wife. An additional exhibit of the timbers from a 3rd-century Roman ship, nicknamed "Asterix", found in St Peter Port harbour in 1982 will shortly be on display close by, having taken decades to preserve the 1,700 year old timbers.

== Protection ==
The whole of Fort Grey and the slipway at Rocquaine was listed as a Protected Monument on 26 March 1938, reference PM238.
