= Les Hanois =

Coordinates: 49.4370°N 2.7000°W

Les Hanois reef, a group of rocks to the south-west of Guernsey also known as Hanoveaux, are the westernmost point of the Channel Islands.

The reef has claimed many shipwrecks over the centuries, such as HMS Boreas (Royal Navy) in 1807. See List of shipwrecks in the Channel Islands.

It is the location of the Les Hanois Lighthouse operated by Trinity House which was built in 1862 from Cornish granite, to a design by James Walker, using a novel dovetail system to lock each stone with the vertically and horizontally adjacent stones. It was built in the hope of reducing the number of ships being lost on the reef on the west coast of Guernsey; it undoubtedly saved a number of ships. However, the wrecks continued, the last disaster being the MV Prosperity in 1974, a freighter lost with all hands on La Conchée reef.

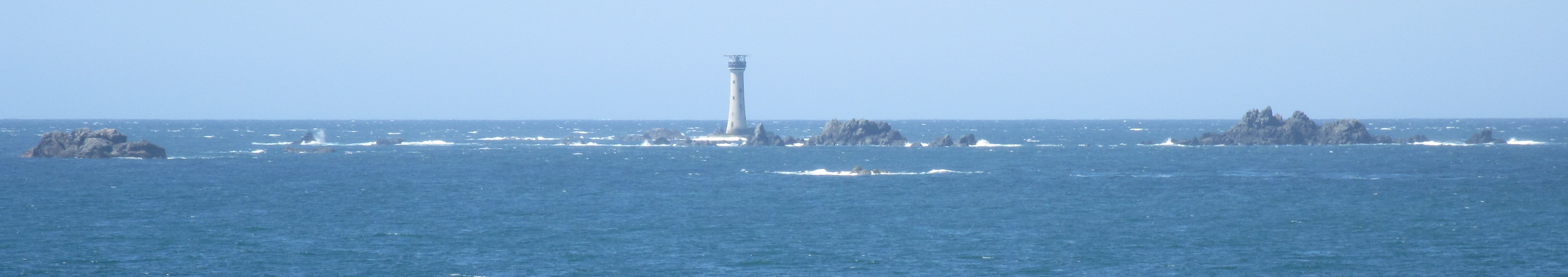
Les Hanois and the lighthouse
