= Le Creux ès Faïes =

Archaeological site in Saint Peter's, Guernsey

- Le Creux ès Faïes
- Le Creux des Fées
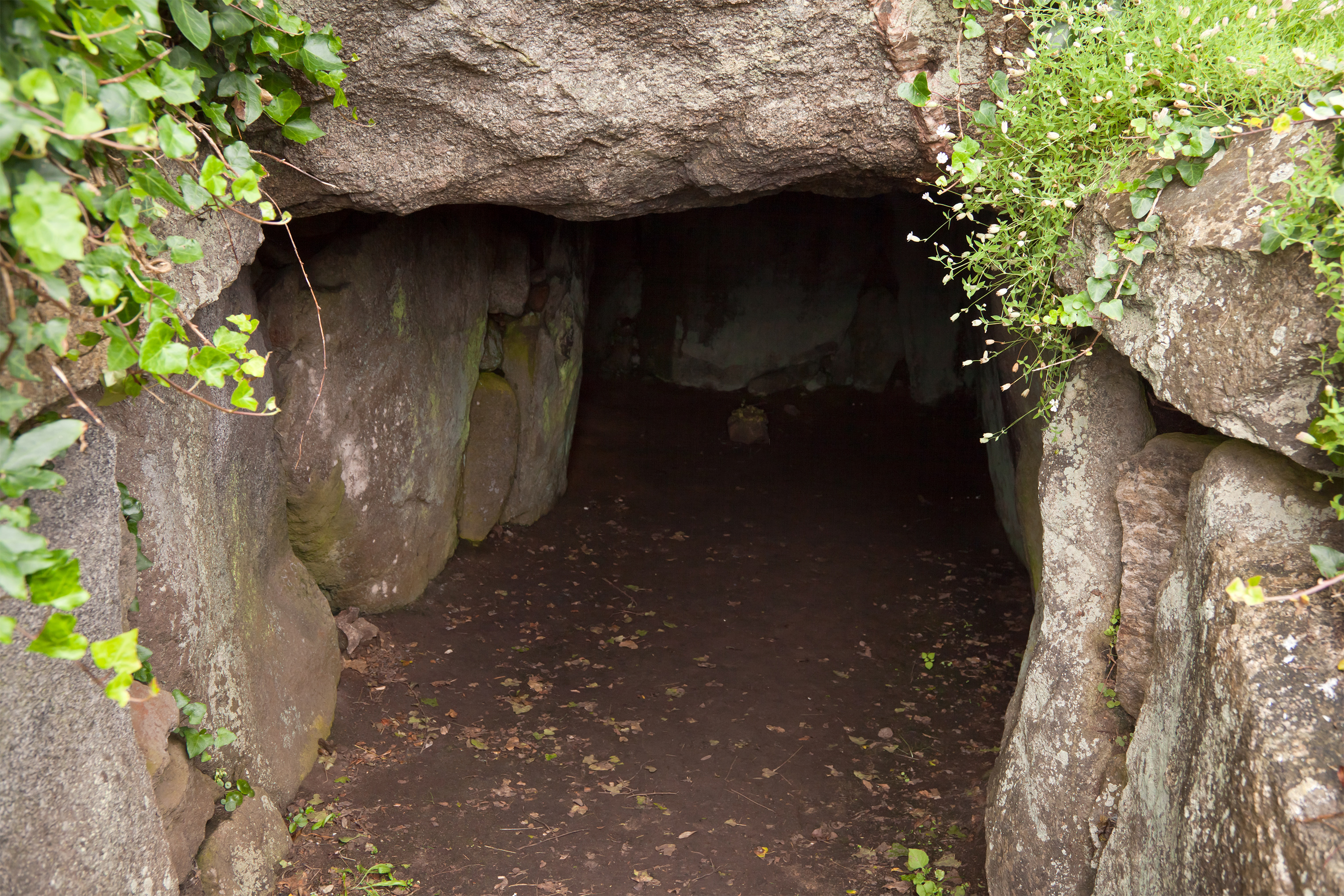
- Interactive map of Le Creux ès Faïes
- 49°27′23.76″N 2°39′20.52″W
- Periods: Neolithic
- Location: Guernsey
- Region: Saint Pierre du Bois

History
- Built: c. 4,000 - 2,500 BC
- Abandoned: c 1,000 BC

Site notes
- Height: 2 m (6 ft 7 in)
- Length: 10 m (33 ft)
- Width: 12 m (39 ft)
- Website: museums.gov.gg/CHttpHandler.ashx?id=76216&p=0

Le Creux ès Faïes is a Neolithic chamber tomb on Guernsey, the Channel Islands.
