= MV Prosperity =

Cargo ship that sank off Guernsey, Channel Islands

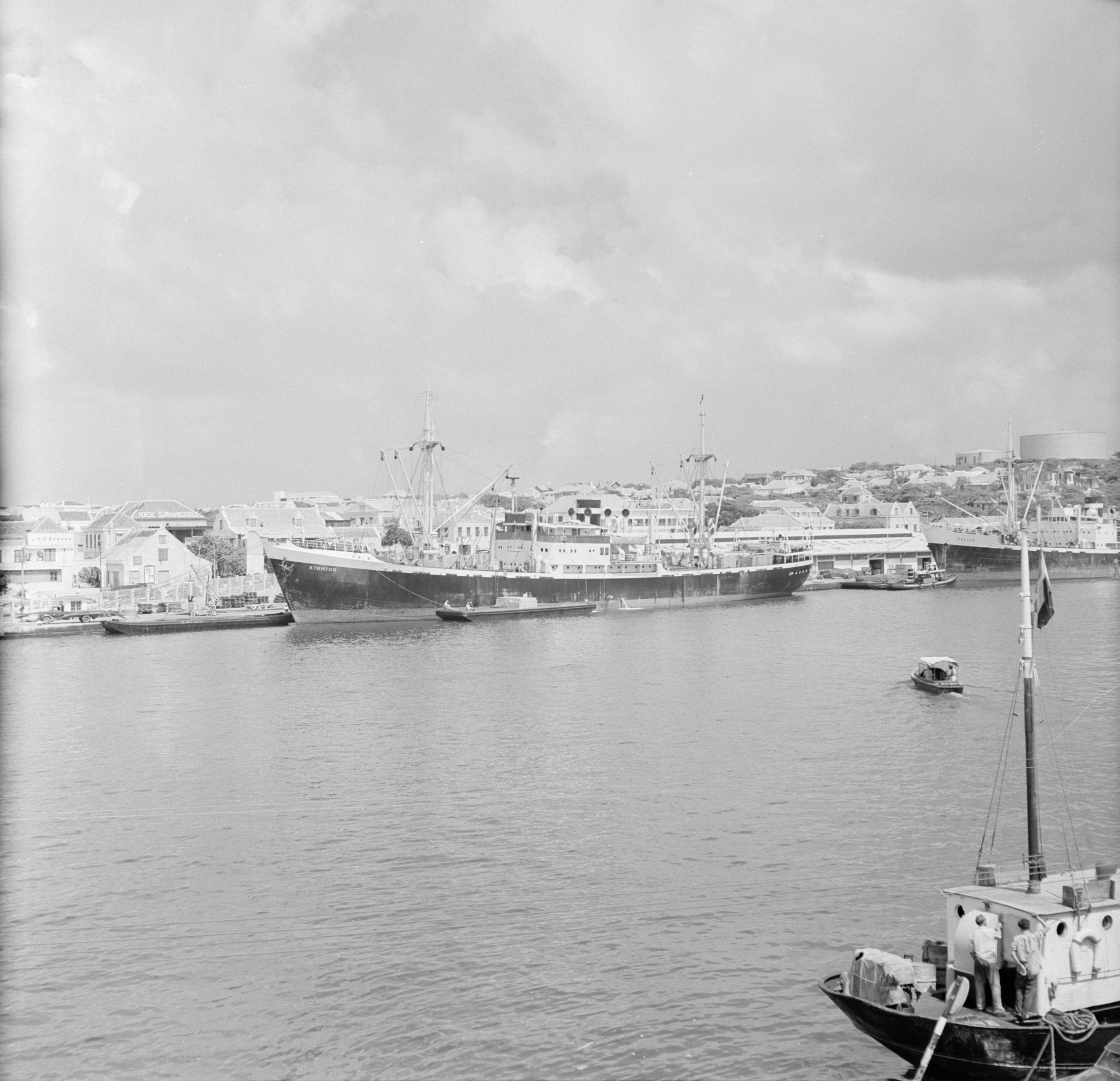
- The ship as Stentor in 1955

History

Cyprus
- Name: Prosperity
- Owner: Prosperity Shipping Company
- Builder: Van der Giessen-de Noord
- Launched: 1940
- Acquired: 1971
- Commissioned: 1940
- In service: 1940–1974
- Out of service: 16 January 1974
- Renamed: Falkenhorst (1940–1943), Stentor (1944–1969), Marianna (1969–1971), Prosperity (1971–)
- Identification: IMO number: 5340584
- Fate: Wrecked on La Conchée Reef, Guernsey, 16–17 January 1974, 49°27.81′N 2°39.38′W

General characteristics
- Type: Merchant cargo vessel
- Tonnage: 2,088 GRT
- Length: 108.0 m (354.3 ft)
- Beam: 13.72 m (45.0 ft)
- Draught: 5.49 m (18.0 ft)
- Installed power: 1 × 7-cylinder Stork 2SCSA diesel engine; 2,200 bhp
- Propulsion: 1 × screw propeller; single shaft
- Speed: 14.5 knots
- Capacity: Timber cargo
- Crew: 18

MV Prosperity was a Cypriot registered cargo ship that struck La Conchee reef near Les Hanois and sank west of Guernsey, on 16-17 January 1974. All eighteen of the vessel's crew of seventeen men and one woman were lost in the sinking.

== History ==
=== Construction ===
The vessel was built in 1940 with the name MV Falkenhorst by N.V. Industrieele Maatschappij De Noord shipyard in Alblasserdam, Netherlands, as a cargo ship of the Kriegsmarine. She measured 108 metres in length and was powered by a seven-cylinder diesel engine, with a top speed of 14.5 knots.

=== Career ===
In 1944, the vessel was renamed Stentor and remained under the name until 1969, though in 1947 she was sold to Koninklijke Nederlandsche Stoomboot Maatschappij based in Amsterdam and served under the Dutch flag. In 1969, she was renamed MV Marianna and was sold to the Primavera Shipping Company based in Famagusta and began operations under the Cypriot flag. She operated under this name for two years, and in 1971, was sold to the Bahi Shipping Company and renamed Prosperity, a name she kept for the rest of her career.

=== Final voyage ===
Before her final voyage Prosperity spent three weeks, from 14 December 1973 to 4 January 1974, docked at Pateniemi in Oulu, Finland, where she was loaded with a cargo of timber. On 4 January the ship departed Finland, bound for Greece. Finnish icebreaker Varma had to smash through sea ice to clear a path so Prosperity could leave. This voyage was intended to be the ship's final voyage, and Captain Georgios Kastellorizios was instructed to unload the timber and take the vessel to a commercial breaker's yard for scrapping.

=== Sinking ===
On the night of 16 January 1974, Prosperity was navigating the English Channel during a storm. The ship suffered an engine failure as it passed Guernsey, leaving it powerless in hurricane-force winds, which swept it into La Conchée Reef, near Les Hanois. The impact tore open the hull, causing the vessel to flood and break apart, at which point the crew abandoned ship. The crew broadcast a distress signal over the radio which, abnormally, was bounced all the way back to Finland to the crew of the icebreaker Varma, who had guided the ship out of the ice just two weeks prior.

As Prosperity sank overnight, Keith Fothergill and John Marshall were winched onto the actively sinking vessel by helicopter to search for survivors, and found none. All eighteen people aboard, seventeen men and one woman, were lost.

=== Aftermath ===
The bodies of 16 crewmen were recovered from the sea following the sinking of the vessel; The body of Captain Georgios Kastellorizios was never recovered. A public funeral was held, and six crew members from Pakistan were buried at Le Foulon Cemetery with full Muslim rites.

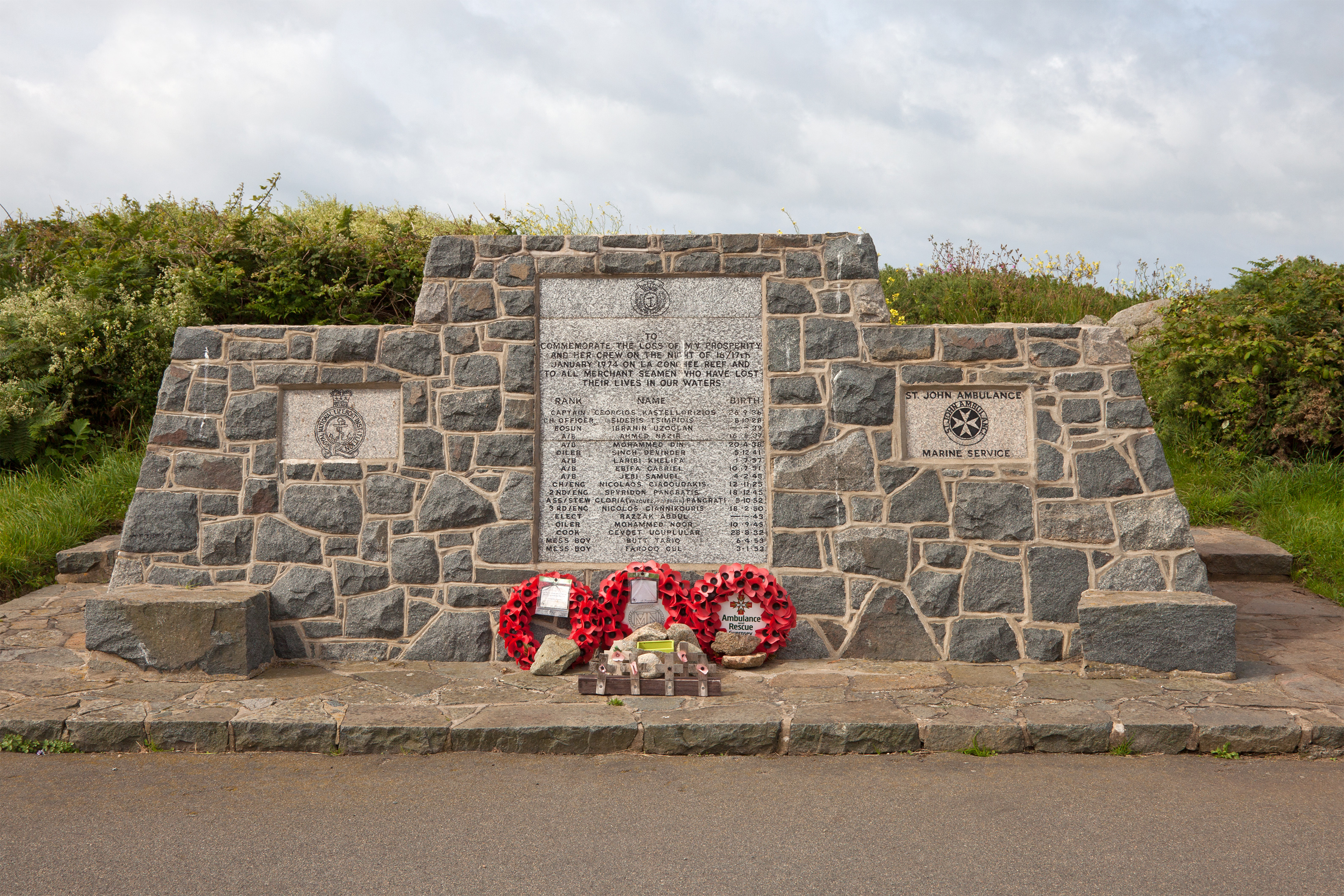
The monument on Lihou.

A stone memorial plaque dedicated to the crew of the vessel was erected on Lihou. Additionally, the car park adjacent to the site was officially named the Prosperity Memorial Car Park.

The remains of the ship lie scattered on the seabed at La Conchée Reef. The wreck site has become a popular destination for scuba divers. Furthermore, the ship's seven-cylinder diesel engine remains largely intact on the seafloor. Some pieces of the vessel are on display at Fort Grey Shipwreck Museum.

== Crew list ==
This is a list of the crew aboard Prosperity when she went down.

Name	Age	Role	Date of Birth	Notes
Abdul Razzak	31	Electrician	1942	
Devinder Sinch	32	Oiler	5 December 1941	
Din Mohammed	36	Sailor	20 April 1938	
Ebifa Gabriel	22	Sailor	10 July 1951	
Nicolaos Giagoudakis	48	Chief Engineer	12 November 1925	
Nicolos Giannikouris	24	3rd Engineer	18 February 1950	
Farooq Gul	21	Mess Boy	3 January 1953	
Georgiou Kastellorizias	Unknown	Captain	Unknown	
Laribi Khelifa	16	Sailor	1 July 1957	Youngest victim
Mohamed Nazir	37	Sailor	16 August 1937	Body recovered
Mohammed Noor	28	Oiler	10 September 1945	
Gloria Pangrati (née Vazquez Ferreira)	21	Assistant Steward	5 October 1952	Wife of Spyridon Pangratis
Spyridon Pangratis	29	2nd Engineer	18 December 1945	Husband of Gloria Pangrati
Jebi Samuel	26	Sailor	4 February 1948	
Tariq Butt	21	Mess Boy	6 April 1953	
Sideris Tsimpidis	45	Chief Officer	8 October 1928	Body recovered 6 February 1974
Cevdet Uguplular	42	Cook	28 August 1932	
Ibrahim Uzoglan	Unknown	Boatswain	Unknown	

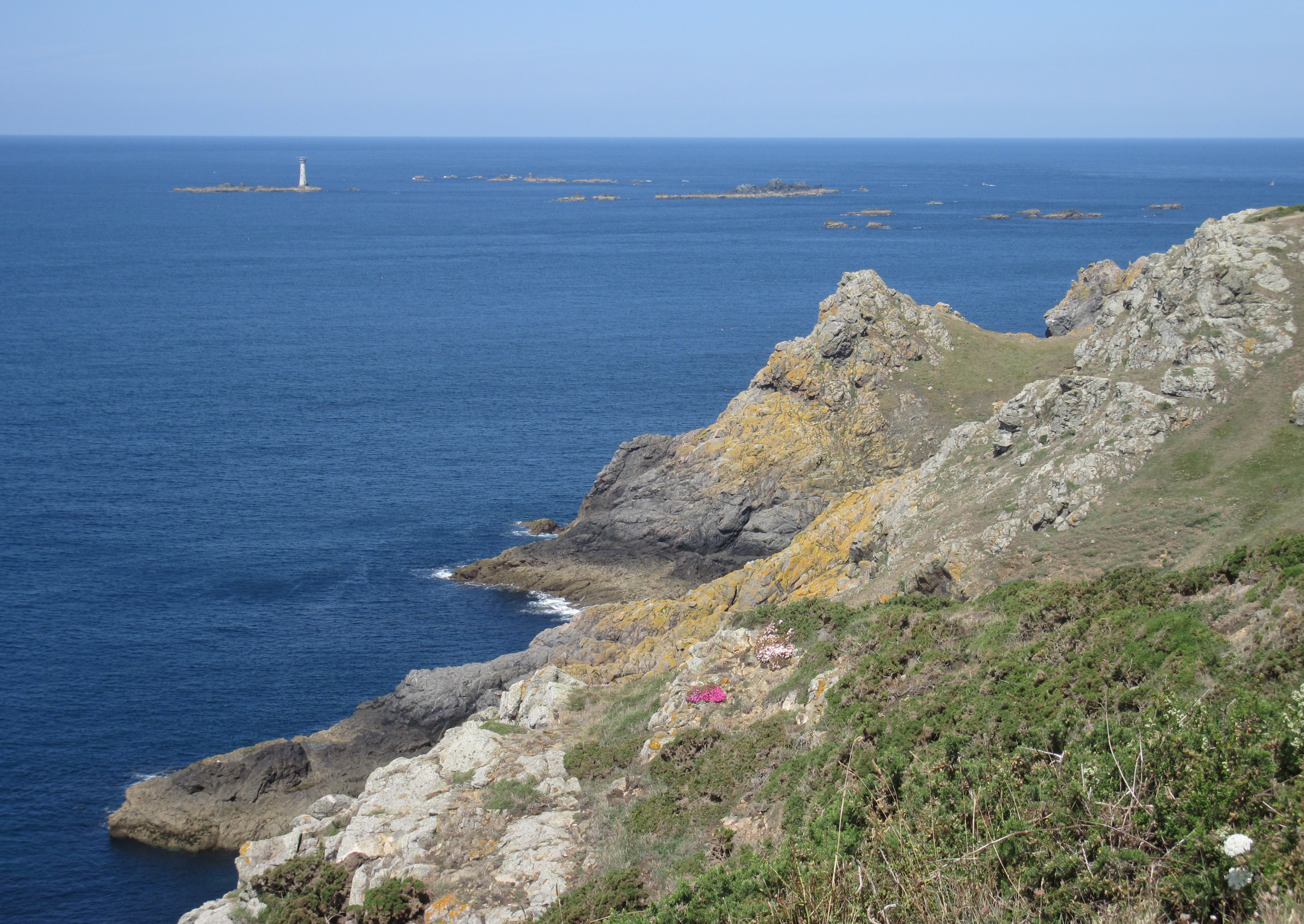
Les Hanois reef, near to where Prosperity went down.

== See also ==
- List of shipwrecks in the Channel Islands
- Les Hanois
- Lihou
