= HMS Boreas (1806) =

Frigate of the Royal Navy

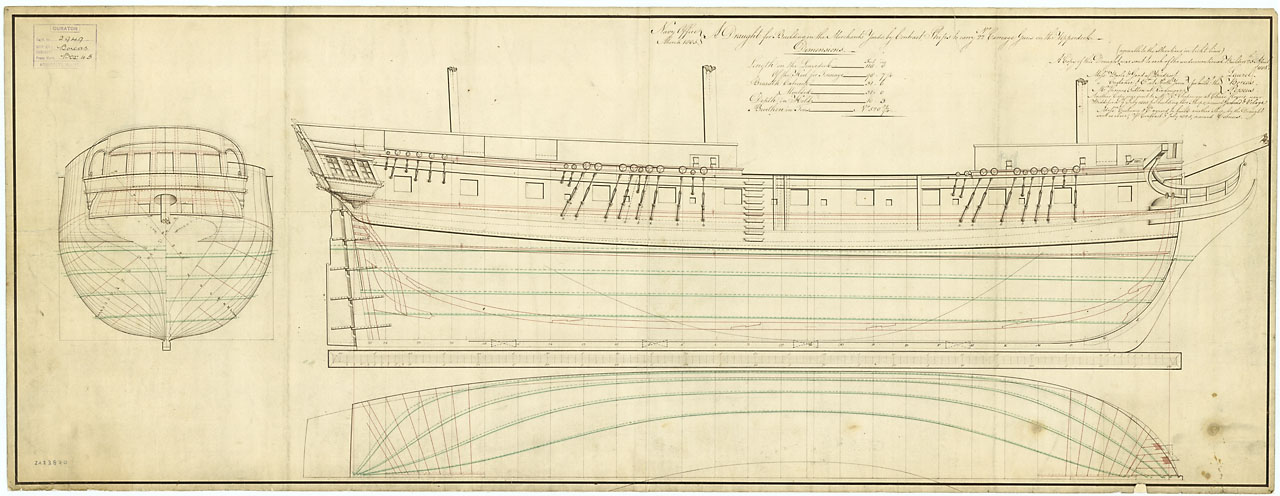
- HMS Boreas

History

United Kingdom
- Name: HMS Boreas
- Ordered: 30 January 1805
- Builder: Stone, Great Yarmouth
- Laid down: June 1805
- Launched: 2 June 1806
- Completed: 16 November 1806 at Chatham Dockyard
- Fate: Wrecked 28 November 1807

General characteristics
- Class & type: 22-gun Laurel-class sixth-rate post ship
- Tons burthen: 52626/94 (bm)
- Length: 118 ft 0 in (36.0 m) (overall)
- Beam: 31 ft 7 3/4 in (9.6 m)
- Depth of hold: 10 ft 3 in (3.12 m)
- Propulsion: Sails
- Sail plan: Full-rigged ship
- Complement: 155
- Armament: As built: Upper deck (UD): 22 × 9-pounder guns; QD: 6 × 24-pounder carronades; Fc: 2 × 6-pounder chase guns; + 2 × 24-pounder carronades; Later rearmed: UD: 22 × 32-pounder carronades; QD: 6 × 18-pounder carronades; Fc: 2 × 6-pounder chase guns; + 2 × 18-pounder carronades

HMS Boreas was a Laurel-class 22-gun post ship launched in 1806. She was wrecked off Guernsey in the Channel Islands on 28 November 1807 with the loss of most of her crew of 154 men.

== Service ==
The Royal Navy commissioned Boreas under the command of Captain Robert Scott. On 2 October 1807 she captured, after a four-hour chase, the French privateer schooner Victoire. The privateer had a crew of 28 men and was armed with swivel guns and small arms. She had sailed from Morlaix the day before and had already captured an American brig, which Boreas recaptured. On 8 October 1807 Boreas and the sixth-rate frigate Brilliant captured the Danish ships St Hans and Montreal.

== Wreck ==
Boreas sailed from Saint Peter Port on Guernsey to the rescue of a pilot cutter that was in difficulty in bad weather. Sailing back around Guernsey with the cutter in tow, she struck the Requiers rock. An expert pilot was on board and had ordered the ship to put about, but the officer of the watch refused to act without permission from the captain, resulting in the loss of the ship in the confusion. After efforts to save Boreas failed, Scott ordered the crew to abandon ship. He sent some men ahead in boats that landed at Hanois Point, but strong seas and the desertion of many of the men prevented the boats from going back to rescue the remaining men. Boreas eventually sank, with only her rigging remaining above water.

The next morning, boats dispatched by Admiral James Saumarez, commander of the Royal Navy Channel Islands squadron and himself a Guernsey native, rescued 30 men. In all, 120 persons drowned, including Scott. Twenty-six of the survivors took advantage of the situation to desert.

The normal post-loss court martial was held with the captain, officers and crew being praised for their "standing in good conduct."

== Post script ==
The sinking of Boreas added greatly to the call to construct a lighthouse, which resulted in Les Hanois Lighthouse being erected on Guernsey between 1860 and 1862.

Fort Grey on Guernsey is now a shipwreck museum and holds one of the cannon from Boreas. The cannon points towards the reef where she sank.
