= Torteval, Guernsey =

Parish in southwestern Guernsey

Coordinates: 49°25′47″N 2°38′46″W

Torteval Tortévas
- Parish
- Flag

- Location of Torteval in Guernsey
- Crown Dependency: Guernsey, Channel Islands

Government
  - Electoral district: West

Area
  - Total: 3.1 km^{2} (1.2 sq mi)

Population (2019)
  - Total: 1,017
  - Density: 330/km^{2} (850/sq mi)
- Time zone: GMT
  - Summer (DST): UTC+01
- Website: torteval.gg

Torteval (Guernésiais: Tortévas) is the smallest of the ten parishes of Guernsey, one of the western parishes. Its name comes from the Guernésiais words for "twisting valley". The parish is split in two by the parish of St. Pierre du Bois, with the part in the east known as Torteval. The detached peninsula to the west is named Pleinmont-Torteval. It includes the westernmost point in Guernsey, and a nature reserve. The reserve, designed for birds in the 1970s, was to be redeveloped for the Diamond Jubilee of Queen Elizabeth II in 2012.

In Guernésiais, people from Torteval were nicknamed "ânes à pid dé ch'fa", or "donkeys with horse's hooves".

In the centre of the parish is a church designed by John Wilson and built in 1818, with the oldest bell in the Channel Islands, dating from 1432. The church is built on the site of an earlier church, consecrated on 4 November 1140, that had fallen into disrepair. The current church has the tallest steeple in Guernsey, which is intended to be used as a sea mark. It was proposed in 1849 to install a light on the steeple, but after inspection by Trinity House it was found unsuitable.

The postal code for street addresses in this parish begins with GY8.

The parish produces a regular magazine called Les Tortévalais.

== Features ==
The features of the parish include:

- Torteval Church
- La Tables des Pions
- Military:
  - Parish war memorial is outside the parish church
  - Fort Pezeries
  - Les Tielles Battery dating from the Napoleonic Wars
  - Narron Battery dating from the Napoleonic Wars
  - Pleinmont Battery dating from the Napoleonic Wars
  - Ruined Watch-house, Pleinmont (mentioned in Victor Hugo's book 'The Toilers of the Sea')
  - Pleinmont Observation Tower
  - Batterie Dollmann
  - German fortifications, built during the occupation 1940-45
- A number of protected buildings
- Bays
  - Portelet (MCS recommended)
  - Rocquaine
- Pleinmont Point
- Cliff paths
- Abreuvoirs
- Torteval nature reserve

The parish of Torteval hosts:

- The Torteval Douzaine
- Torteval scarecrow festival
- TV relay tower
- Hotels and restaurants
- Countryside walks

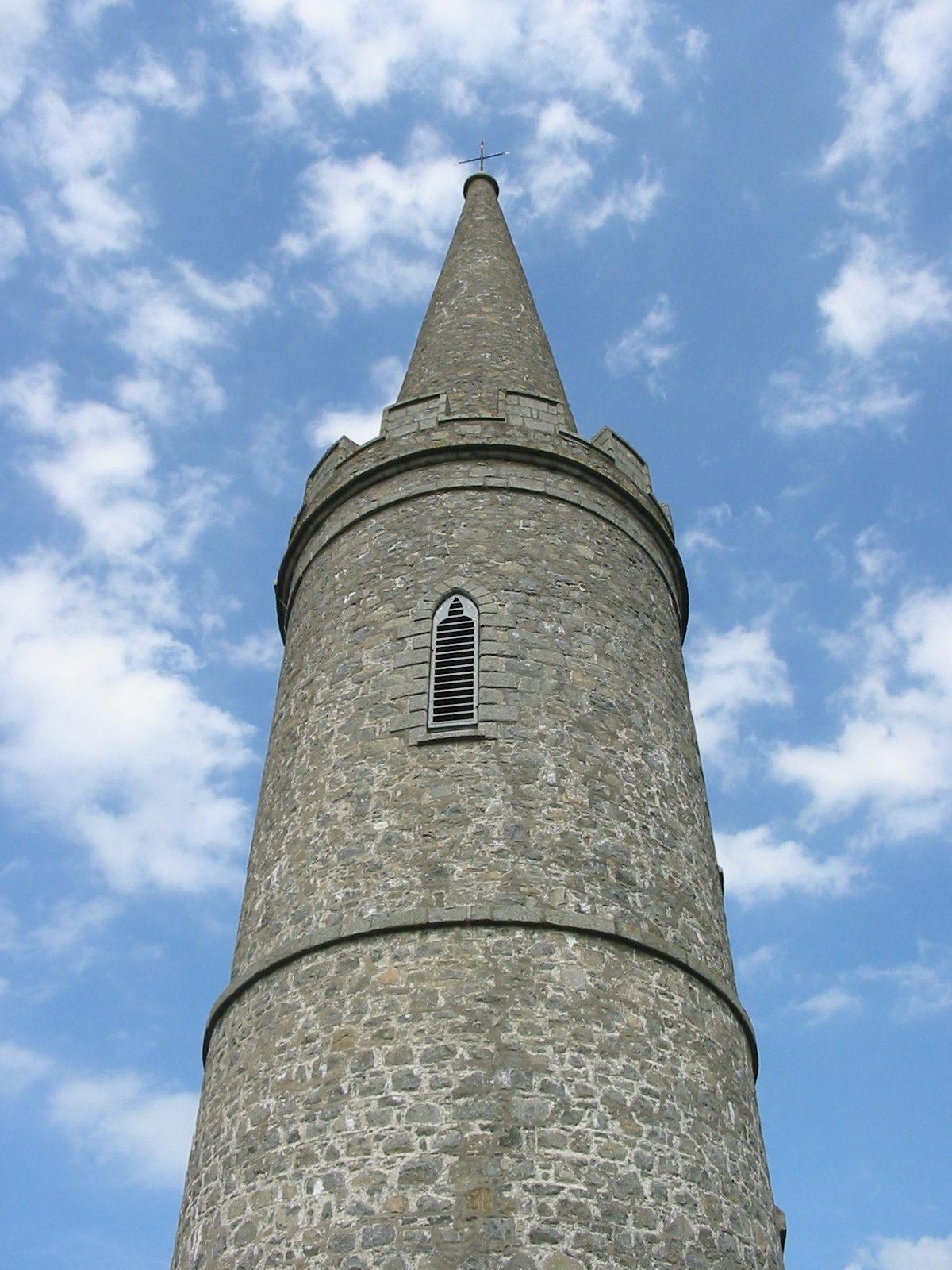
Torteval Church

== Politics ==
Torteval comprised part of the West administrative division with Forest, St. Saviour's and St. Pierre-du-Bois, until the 2018 referendum implemented a single constituency.

In the 2016 Guernsey general election there was a 3,188 or 74% turnout to elect five Deputies. Those elected (in order of votes received) being Al Brouard, Andrea Dudley-Owen, Emilie Yerby, David De Lisle and Shane Langlois.
