= Saint Peter, Guernsey =

Parish in western Guernsey

Saint Peter Saint Pierre du Bois
- Parish
- Flag

- Location of Saint Pierre Du Bois in Guernsey
- Coordinates: 49°26′28″N 2°38′28″W
- Crown Dependency: Guernsey, Channel Islands

Government
  - Electoral district: West

Area
  - Total: 6.2 km^{2} (2.4 sq mi)

Population (2019)
  - Total: 2,036
  - Density: 330/km^{2} (850/sq mi)
- Time zone: GMT
  - Summer (DST): UTC+01
- Website: stpierredubois.org

St Peter's (Guernesiais: Saint Pierre), known officially as Saint Pierre du Bois (English: "St. Peter in the Wood"), is a parish in Guernsey. It is the centre for the Guernsey Western Parishes which includes Torteval, St Saviour's and the Forest.

The old Guernesiais nickname for people from Saint Pierre was etcherbaots which means beetles.

The postal code for street addresses in this parish begins with GY7.

St Peter's won the Britain in Bloom small coastal prize in 2015. and a gold medal in the 2016 Champion of Champions competition.

== Geography ==
The parish is located in the West of the Island and has borders with the parishes of Torteval, St. Saviour's, Forest and St. Andrew's.

The parish is mainly countryside with a small village in the centre. The parish church is one of the most unusual in the islands as it is built at the bottom of a small valley and the interior of the church is not flat but diagonal in appearance.

== Features ==
The features of the parish include:

- St Peter's church
- St Peter's village
- Lihou
- Military:
  - Parish war memorial outside parish church
  - Fort Grey Château du Rocquaine
  - Fort Saumarez
  - L'Eree Battery
  - Mont Herault watchhouse
  - Batterie Mirus
  - German fortifications, built during the occupation 1940-45
- A number of protected buildings
- Le Creux es Faies neolithic passage grave can be found on the L'Eree headland. In local folk lore it is said to be one of the entrances to fairy land.
- Beaches
  - Rocquaine Bay
  - Le Crocq du Sud
  - L'Erée (MCS recommended)
- Lihou
- Nature reserves
  - Silbe nature reserve
  - Colin Best nature reserve
  - La Claire Mare nature reserve
  - Lihou Island nature reserve
- Abreuvoirs (places for cattle to drink)

The parish of the Vale hosts:

- St Peter's Douzaine
- Styx community centre
- Countryside walks

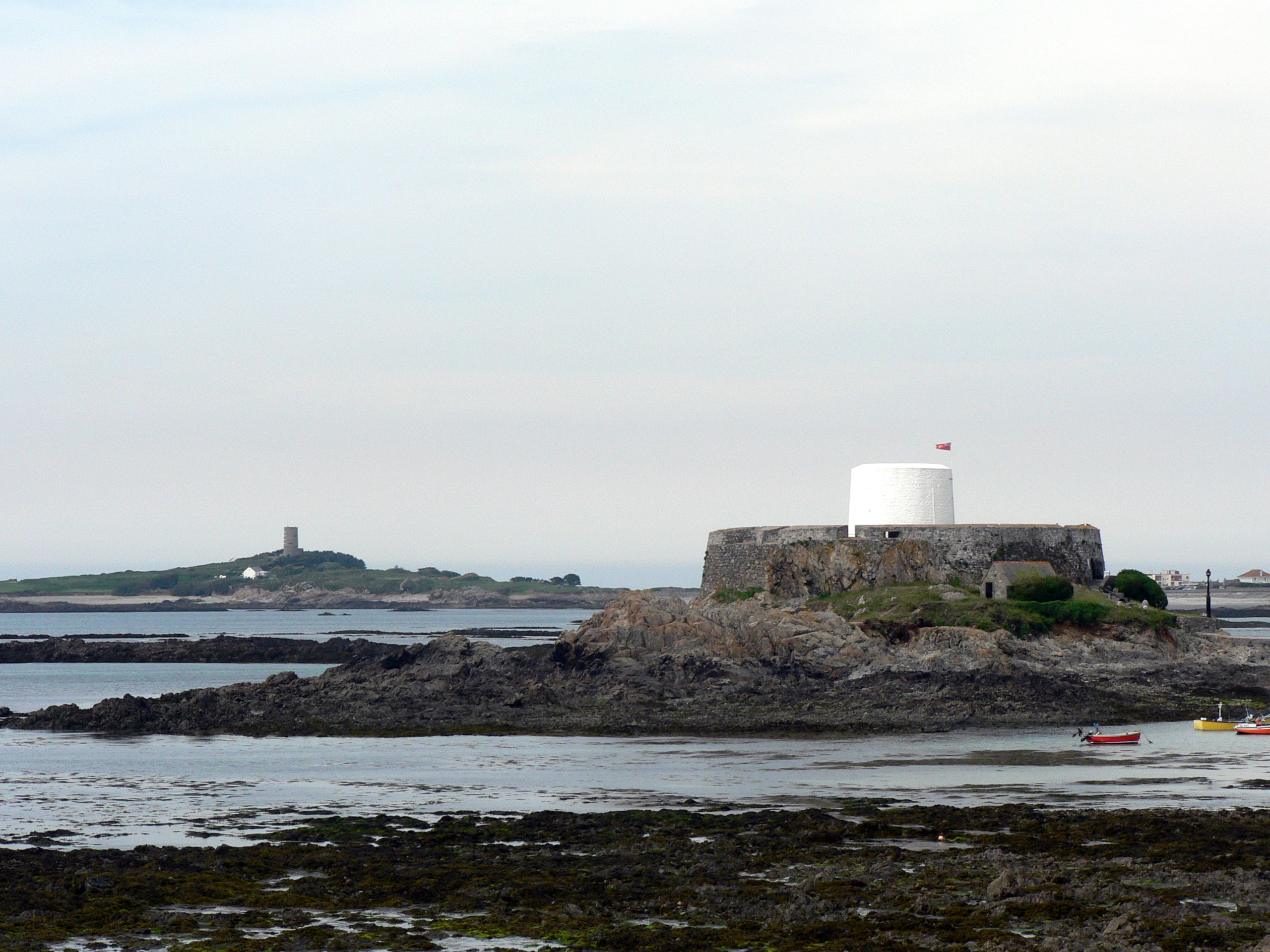
Fort Grey

== Politics ==
Residents of Saint Peter vote in the island wide voting for deputies. The most recent election was the 2025 Guernsey general election.

== Notable people ==
- Sampson Avard, the leader of a band of Mormon vigilantes called the Danites, which existed in Missouri during the period of the 1838 Mormon War.
- Harry Lewis, also known as W2S and is a member of the Sidemen.
