= Écréhous =

Group of islands and rocks in Bailiwick of Jersey

Native name: Les Écréhous, Êcrého
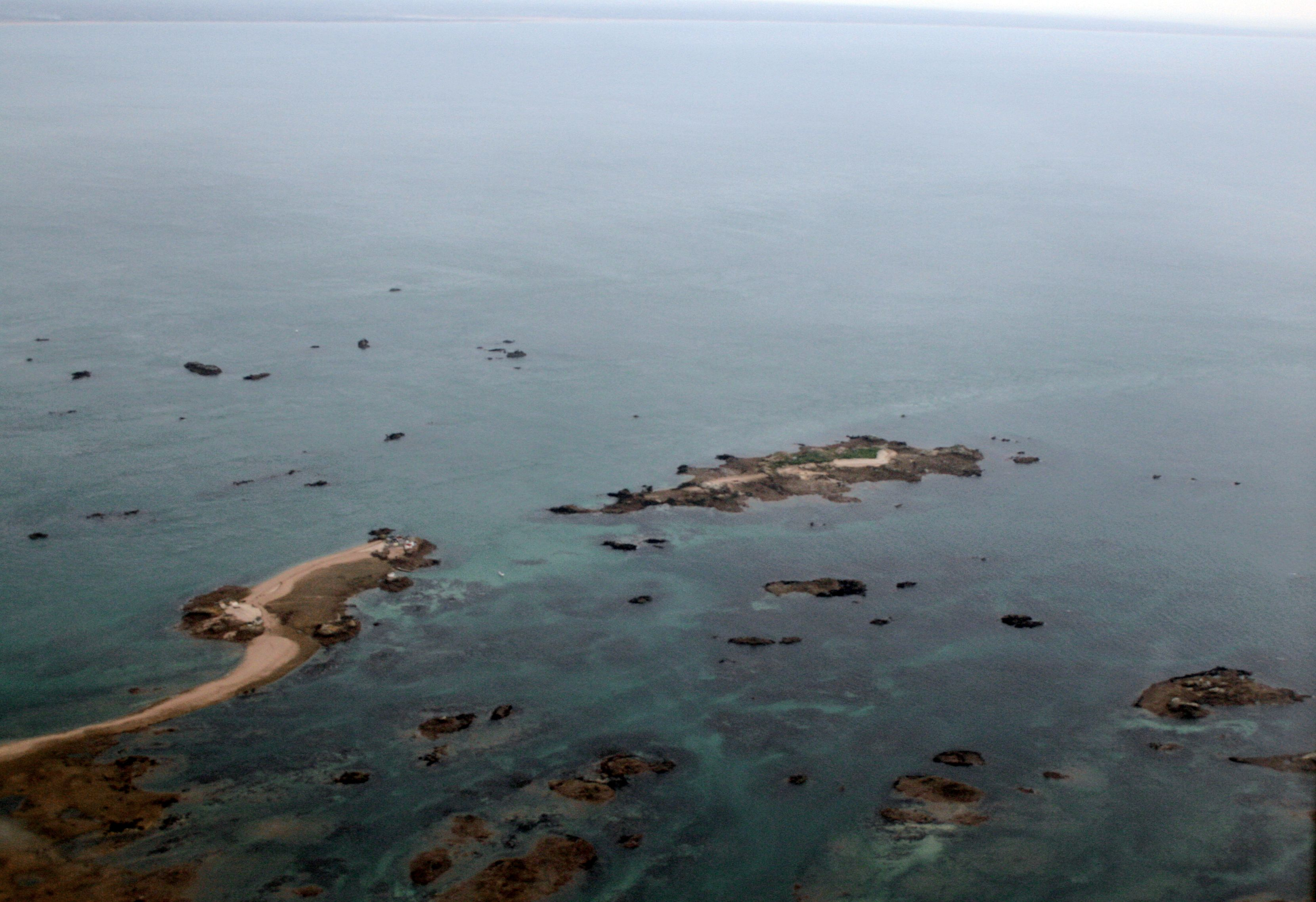
- Aerial view of the Écréhous.
- Interactive map of Écréhous

Geography
- Location: English Channel
- Coordinates: 49.283°N 1.933°W
- Major islands: Maîtr'Île; La Marmotchiéthe; Lé Bliantch'Île

Administration
- Jersey
- Parish: Saint Martin, Jersey

Demographics
- Population: 0

Ramsar Wetland
- Official name: Les Écréhous & Les Dirouilles, Jersey
- Designated: 2 February 2005
- Reference no.: 1455

The Écréhous (French pronunciation: [ekʁeu]; or in Jèrriais: Êcrého) are a group of islands and rocks situated six miles (9.7 km) north-east of Jersey, and eight miles (13 km) from France. They form part of the Bailiwick of Jersey and are administratively part of the Parish of St Martin.

== Etymology ==
The name 'Ecrehous' is Norse in origin. "Esker" as in Skerry meaning a stony bank and 'Hou', the toponym found also in Jethou, Lihou, Brecqhou, Burhou and other islets, derives from holm, meaning island. The first part of the name appears to be traced back to the Norse word sker, meaning reef. The Ecrehous are actually, geologically, part of the same island group as Les Dirouilles (west) and Les Pierres de Lecq ('the Paternosters') (further west).

== Islets ==
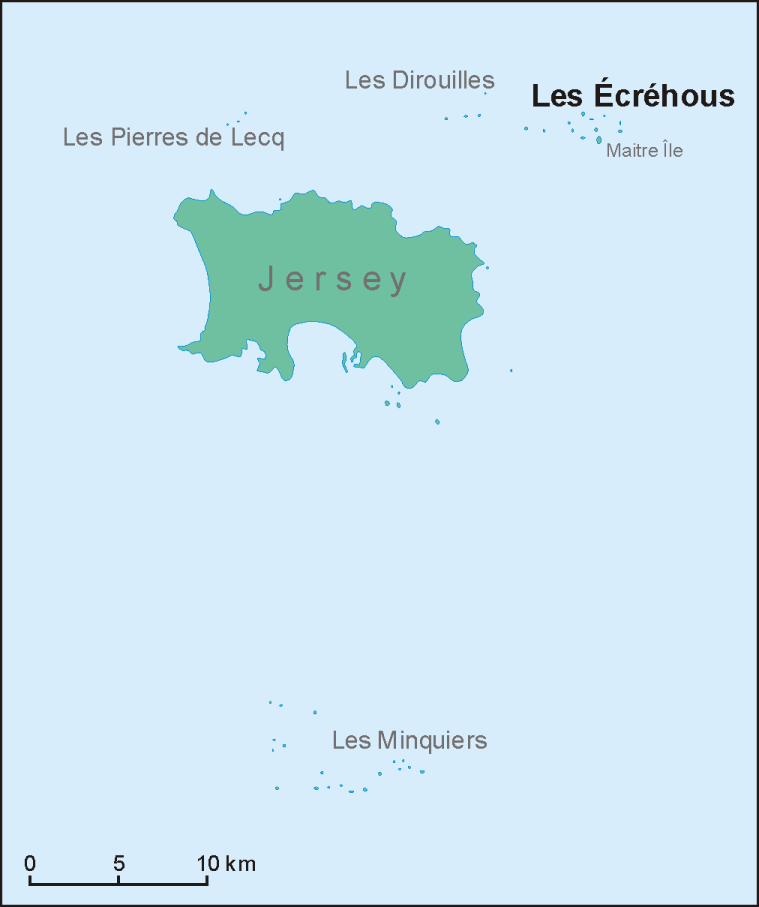
Location map of Les Écréhous

The most significant islets in the group are:

- Maîtr'Île
- La Marmotchiéthe ('La Marmotière' in gallicized form)
- Lé Bliantch'Île (La Blanche Île in gallicized form);

others include:

- Les D'mies
- La Grand' Naithe
- L'Etchièrviéthe
- Lé Fou
- La Froutchie

All but the three largest are submerged at high tide. There are no permanent residents on the islands and there is no fresh water there. Due to erosion, they are now much smaller than they may have been within historic times. Maîtr'Île, the largest of the islets, is about 300 metres (0.19 miles) long. There are a small number of fishermen's huts, some used as holiday residences, on the largest islets, and one official building, a customs house, on La Marmotchiéthe.

== History ==
During the last ice age, sea levels were lower and the islands were high ground above a plain that connected the European Continent with southern England.

=== Sovereignty ===
The islets, along with the other Channel Islands and the Cotentin Peninsula, were annexed to the Duchy of Normandy in 933. After William, Duke of Normandy conquered England in 1066 the islands remained united to the Duchy until the conquest of mainland Normandy in 1204 by Philip Augustus. In 1259 Henry III did homage to the French king for the Channel Islands. While Edward III in the 1360 Treaty of Brétigny waived his claims to the crown of France and to Normandy, he reserved various territories to England.

=== Chapel and priory ===
In 1203, shortly before the division of Normandy in 1204, John, Duke of Normandy granted the Ecrehous to the Abbey of Val-Richer so that they might build a church there. The chapel measured 10 feet 3 inches (3.12 m) in width and 16 feet 6 inches (5.03 m) in length; the priory accommodation for the monks formed an extension to the chapel. In 1309 it was reported that a prior was living in the Ecrehos with one monk and a servant; a navigation light was lit every night.

In 1413 alien priories were suppressed, and the monks returned to Val-Richer. Their church and priory on La Maîtr'Île fell into ruins.

=== Crime use ===
In the 17th century the Ecrehous were used by smugglers. It was recorded that the main smuggled goods in the 1690s through the Ecrehous were lead and gunpowder destined for St Malô.

During fractious political elections in the 1700s and 1800s, it was not uncommon for Jersey citizens to find themselves taken and stranded on the Islands by their political opponents. This was a means to control voting in certain areas so that the incumbent held onto their seat.

=== Long-term residents ===
Though they are only inhabited sporadically by holidaymakers and fishermen, in the past there have been more permanent residents on the Ecrehous due to more abundant vegetation. Two eccentrics who lived on the Ecrehous for a long time proclaimed themselves to be Le Roi des Écréhous (The King of the Ecrehous) and claimed that sovereignty over the islands belonged to them. Philippe Pinel lived on Bliantch'Île from 1848 to 1898 and exchanged gifts with Queen Victoria. In the 1960s and 1970s Alphonse Le Gastelois found refuge in the islands from unfounded public suspicion of being the Beast of Jersey, a notorious sexual attacker of children who was later arrested, thus clearing Le Gastelois of suspicion.

=== Resolution of disputed status ===
In the 19th and early 20th centuries there were several occasions on which nominal control was displayed, including flags and buoys, and there were several occasions on which the British government indicated to the French government that it wished to settle the matter.

In 1950 France took the United Kingdom to the International Court of Justice (ICJ) for discussions to decide to which country the Minquiers and Ecrehous belonged. The French fished in the waters, but Jersey exercised various administrative rights. In the Minquiers and Ecrehos case, the ICJ considered the historical evidence, and in its judgment of 17 November 1953 awarded the islands to Jersey.

=== On currency ===
La Marmotchiéthe is depicted on the 2010 issue Jersey 50 pound note.

=== Protected status ===
In 2005, the States of Jersey designated it as an area under the Ramsar convention, signifying it was a wetland of international importance and giving it an enhanced status and recognition. A management plan for the area has yet to be published. There was a public consultation in 2010 into Jersey's management of Ramsar areas but the results were not made public.

In 2022, four areas of Les Ecréhous islands were introduced under Jersey's wildlife law. This decision was made in order to protect the breeding activities and nesting of wild birds, some of them including European shags, great cormorants, common terns, the roseate terns, and oystercatchers. In practice, this means unauthorized people cannot enter during breeding periods, the speed of boats is limited, dogs may not enter, and the use of drones, lasers, and fireworks is prohibited.

== Pilotage and sailing ==
Entrance to the islands can be difficult. However, it is possible to visit at all states of tide with the main entrance from the southwest.

== Gallery ==
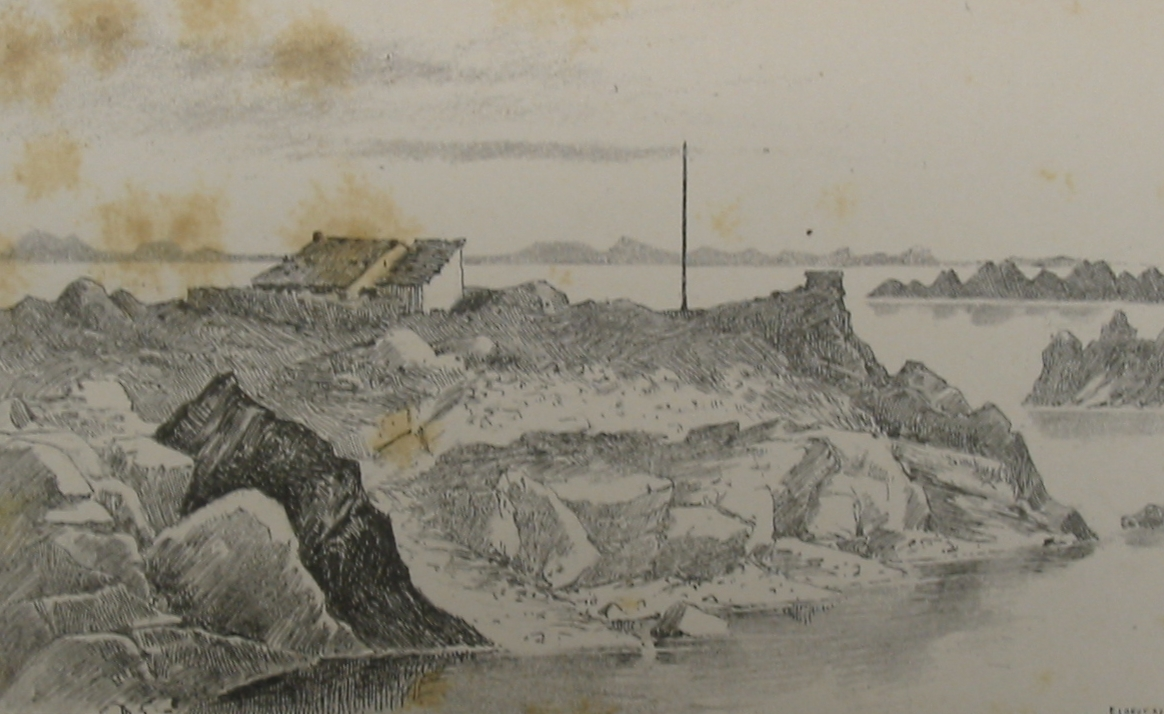
19th century illustration

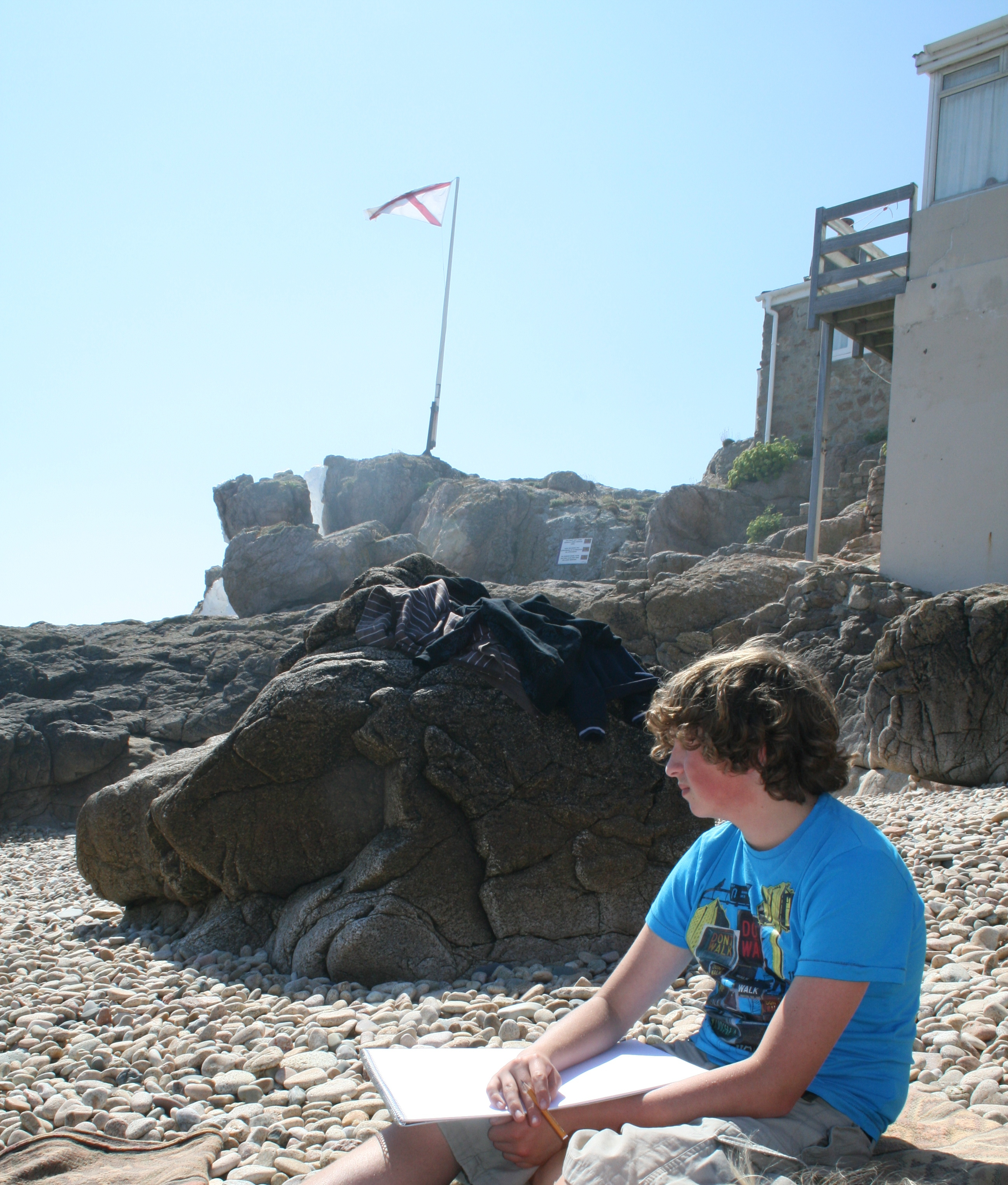
La Marmotchiéthe Flag Mast 2008

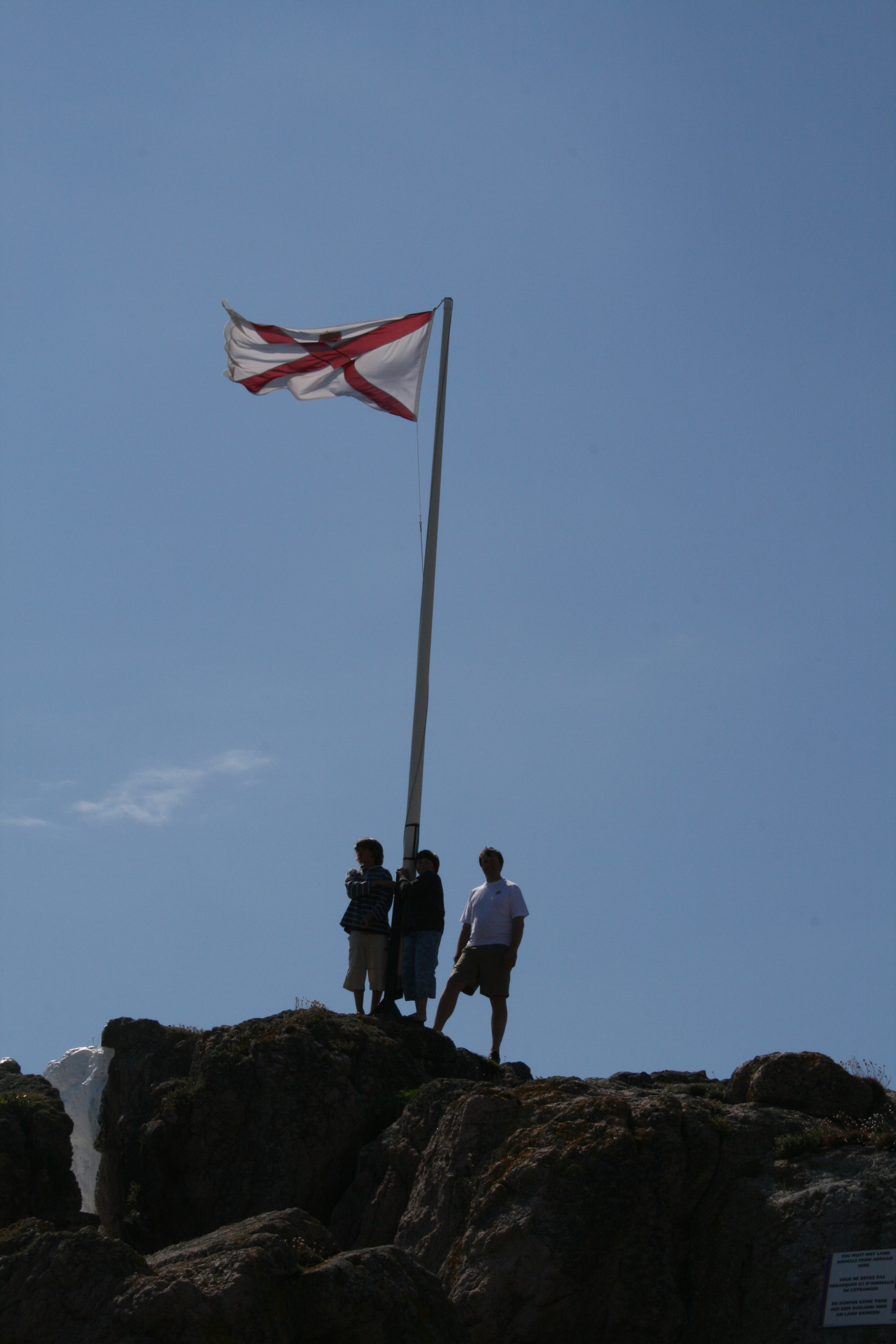
La Marmotchiéthe Flag Mast 2008

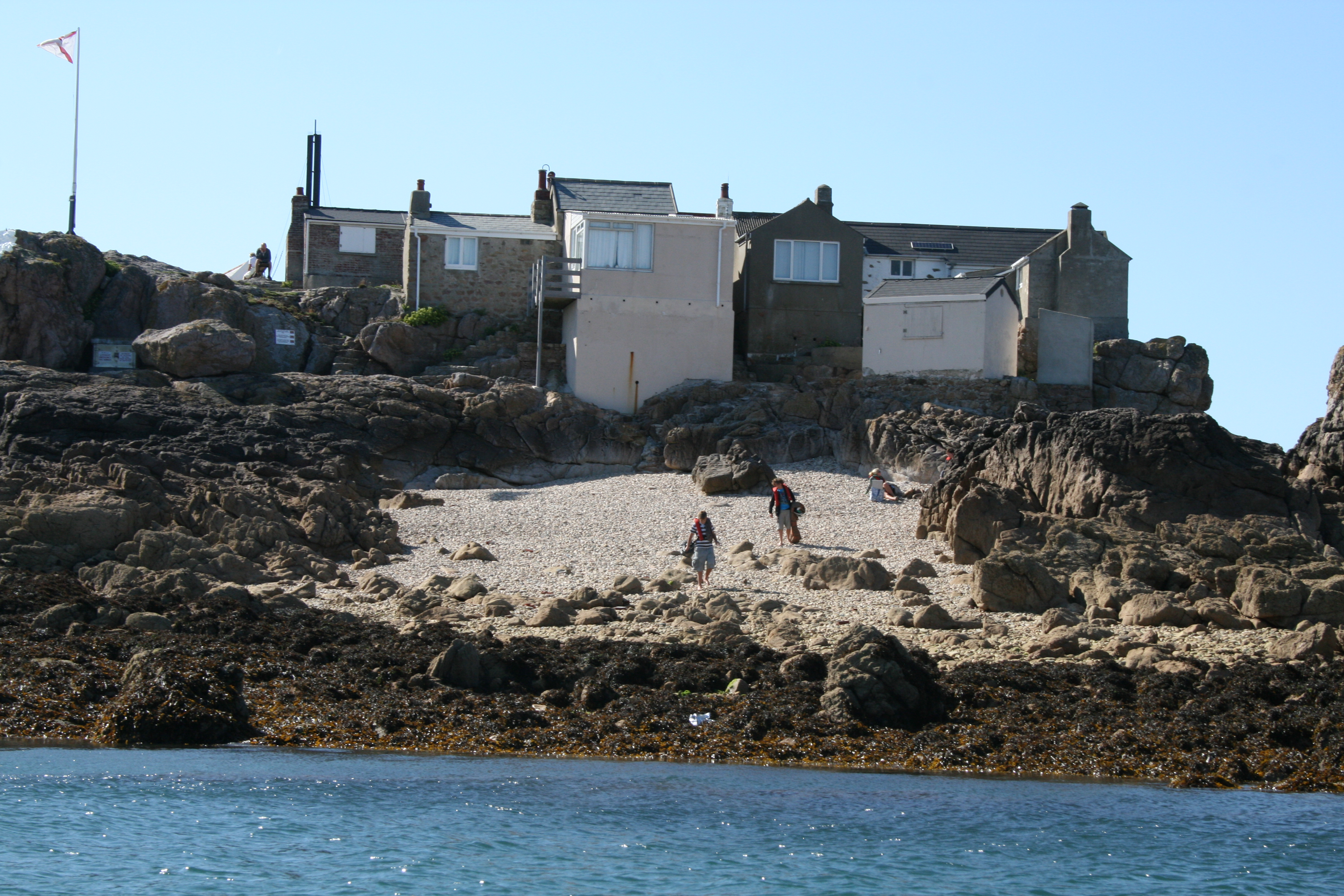
La Marmotchiéthe from the South

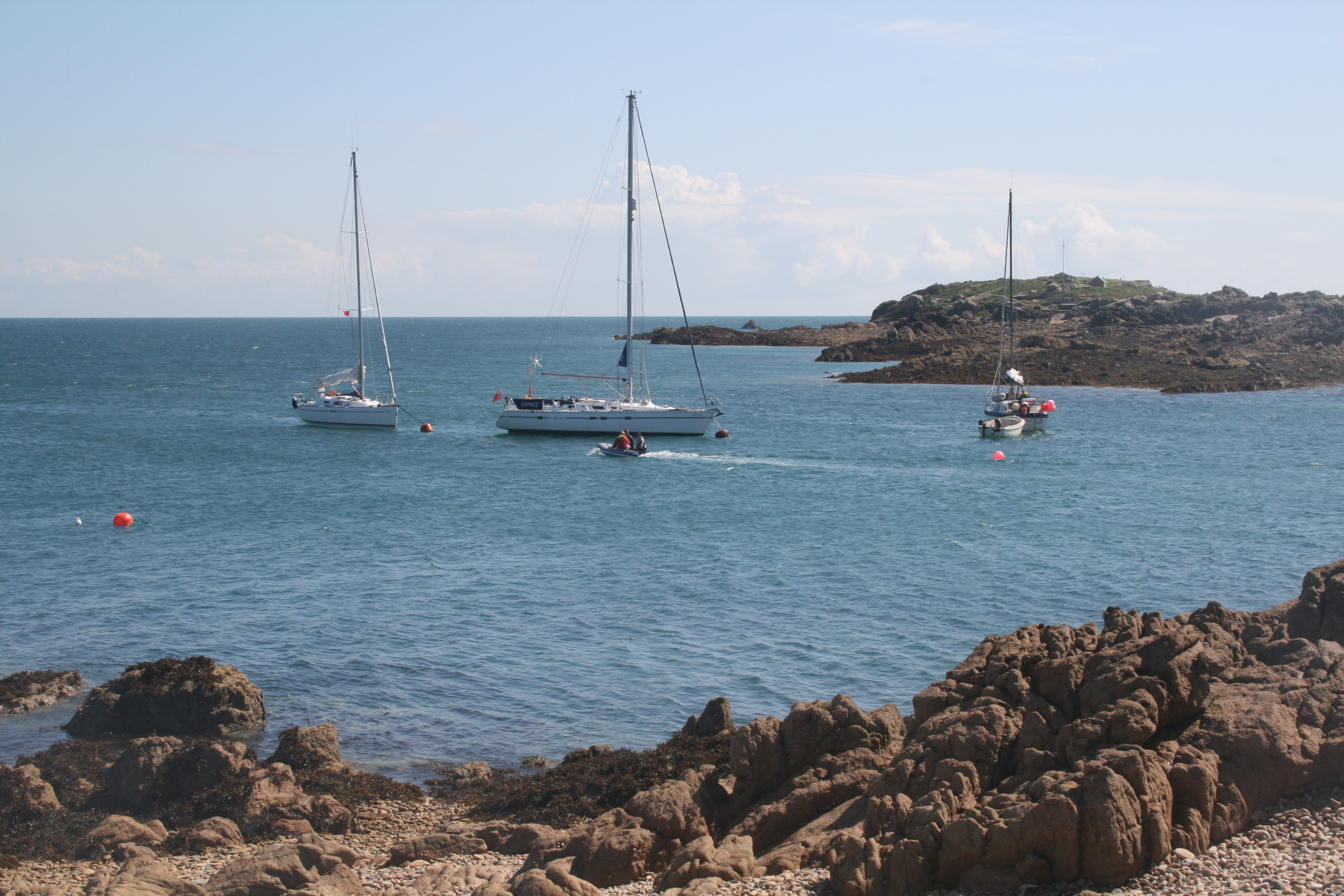
Looking South from La Marmotchiéthe
