= Minquiers =

Group of islands and rocks in the Bailiwick of Jersey

Les Minquiers, Les Mîntchièrs, The Minkies
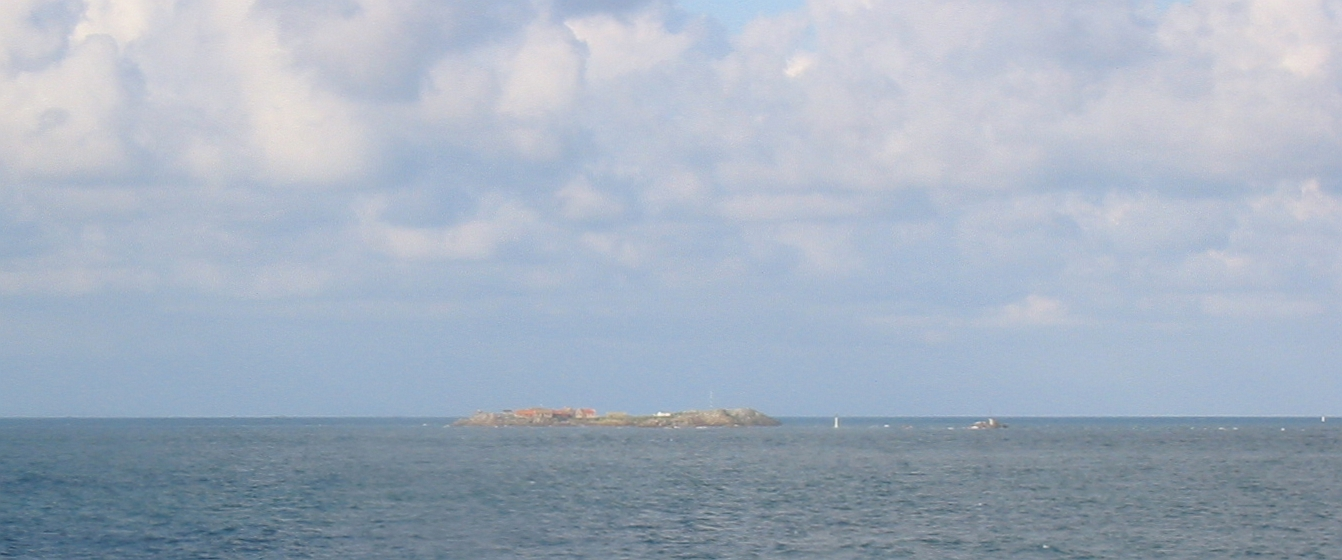
- La Maîtr' Île

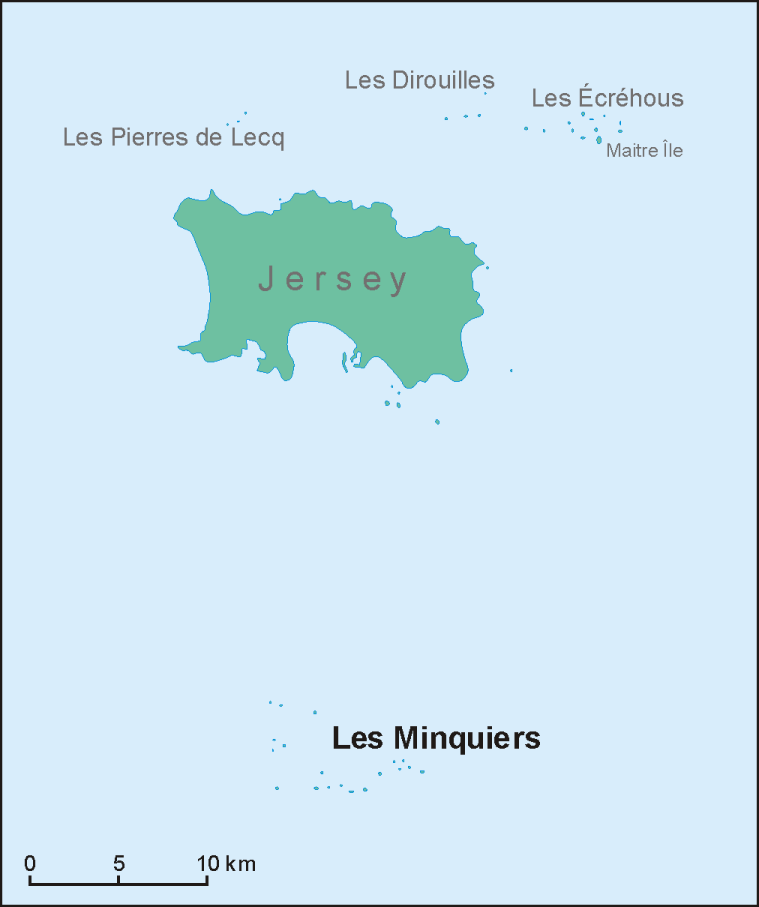

Geography
- Location: English Channel
- Coordinates: 48°58′14″N 02°03′43″W
- Major islands: Maîtresse Île / Maîtr' Île; Les Maisons

Administration
- Jersey
- Parish: Grouville

Demographics
- Population: none permanent

Ramsar Wetland
- Official name: Les Minquiers, Jersey
- Designated: 2 February 2005
- Reference no.: 1456

The Minquiers (French pronunciation: [mɛ̃kje]; Les Minquiers with definite article; Jèrriais: Les Mîntchièrs; known as "the Minkies" in local English) are a group of islands and rocks, about 15 kilometres (8 nautical miles) south of Jersey. They form part of the Bailiwick of Jersey. They are administratively part of the Parish of Grouville, and of its Vingtaine La Rocque.

The rock shelf around the Minquiers has a larger surface area than Jersey itself, but at high tide, only a few of the main heads remain above water. The largest of these is Maîtresse, measuring approximately 50 metres (55 yards) in length and 20 metres (22 yards) in width, featuring around ten stone cottages in varying conditions of preservation. These are the most southerly buildings in the British Isles, but they have no permanent inhabitants; though fishermen, vraic (seaweed used for fertilizer) collectors, yachtsmen, kayakers, and even radio amateurs make summer landfall.

== Name ==
The etymology of the name is disputed, and could either come from the Breton language minihi, meaning a sanctuary, or from minkier, meaning a seller of fish.

== Geography ==
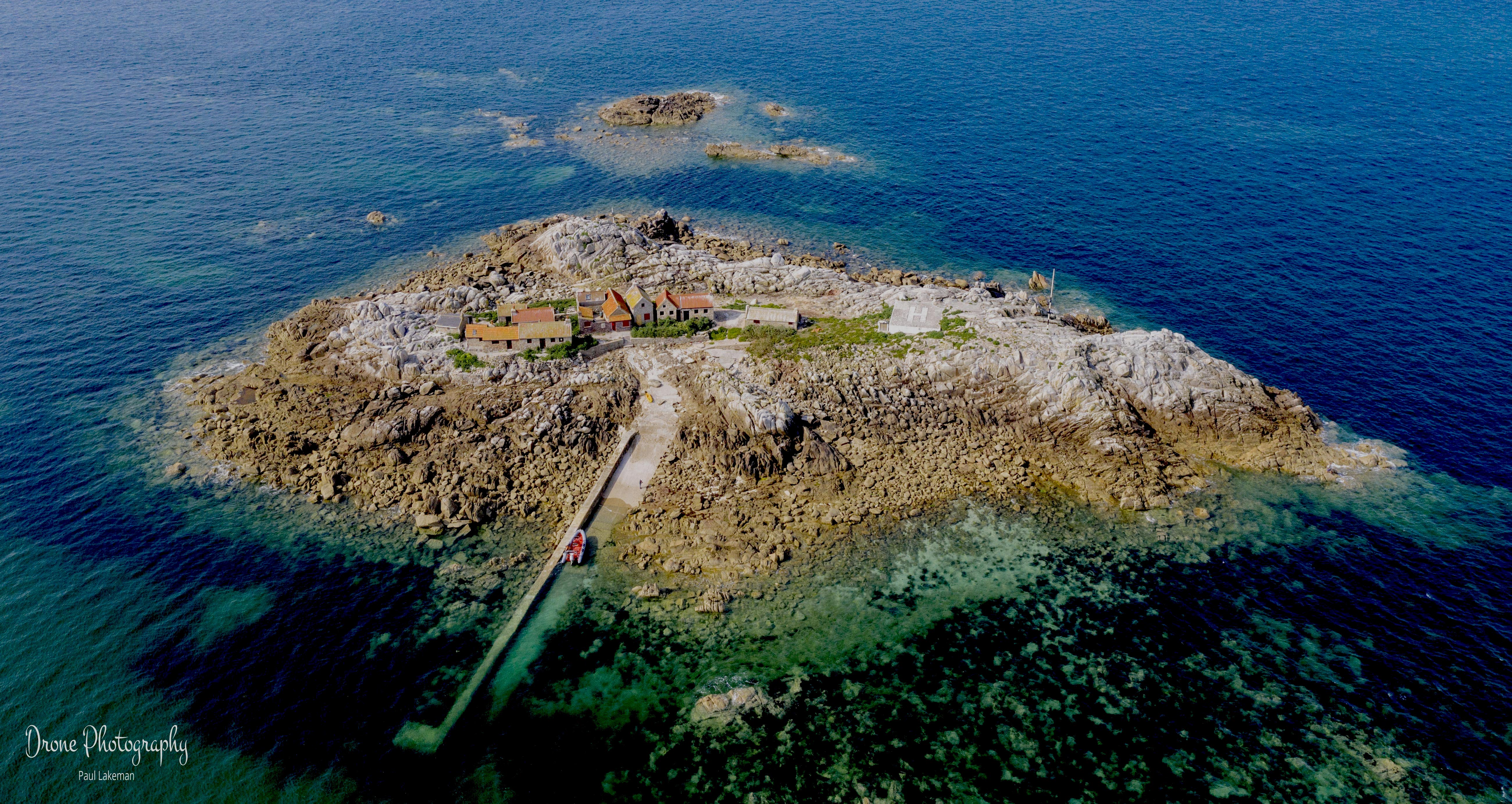
Drone image

Thousands of years ago, around the time of the last glacial period, when sea level was lower, the Channel Islands were high ground on the plain connecting the European Continent and southern England.

=== Islets ===
The most significant islands in the group are:

- Maîtresse Île / Maîtr' Île
- Les Maisons

Others include:

- Le Niêsant
- Les Faucheurs
- La Haute Grune

=== Protection ===
The Minquiers are designated as protected under the Ramsar Convention.

== History ==
In 933 AD, the Duchy of Normandy annexed the islets, along with the other Channel Islands and the Cotentin Peninsula. After William, Duke of Normandy, conquered England in 1066, the islands remained united to the Duchy until Philip Augustus conquered mainland Normandy in 1204. In 1259, Henry III did homage to the French king for the Channel Islands. Edward III, in the 1360 Treaty of Brétigny, waived his claims to the crown of France and Normandy, but reserved various other territories to England, including the Channel Islands.

By 1911, the 1911 Britannica recorded that Maîtresse Île "affords a landing and shelter for fishermen."

During World War II, a small company of Wehrmacht soldiers on the Minquiers was among the last to surrender in the Second World War. A French fishing boat, skippered by Lucian Marie, approached the island of Minquiers and anchored nearby. A fully armed German soldier approached and asked for help saying, "We've been forgotten by the British, perhaps no one on Jersey told them we were here. I want you to take us over to England, we want to surrender". This was on 23 May 1945, three weeks after the war in Europe ended.

In July 1970, the former French Prime Minister Félix Gaillard, who served in that office from 1957 until 1958, disappeared during a yachting journey; his body was found in the sea off Les Minquiers some days after his disappearance.

In August 2018, one of the twenty buildings on the islands was sold to private individuals using a Jersey company. Only five sales have been recorded in 50 years.

=== Resolution of status ===
In 1950, Britain and France went to the International Court of Justice (ICJ) for arbitration to decide which country the Minquiers and Ecrehos belonged. The French fished in the waters, but Jersey exercised various administrative rights. The ICJ considered the historical evidence, and in its judgment of 17 November 1953, awarded the islands to Jersey (as represented by the United Kingdom).

In 1998, some French individuals "invaded" the Minquiers on behalf of the "King of Patagonia" in "retaliation" for the British occupation of the Falkland Islands, and raised the French flag. The Union Jack was restored the next day.

== In literature ==
The Minquiers are mentioned at length by Victor Hugo in his novel Toilers of the Sea (1866). He mentions how treacherous they are, and says that their combined area is bigger than mainland Jersey itself. Hugo lived in both Guernsey and Jersey at various points in his life, and so was familiar with local lore.

The British-French dispute over Les Minquiers is a plot element in Nancy Mitford's novel Don't Tell Alfred (1960), as an occasional cause for dispute between the 'two old ladies' – France and Britain.

The Minquiers feature in the seafaring adventure novel The Wreck of the Mary Deare (1956), by Hammond Innes, and its 1959 film adaptation.

== See also ==
- Félix Gaillard

== Images ==
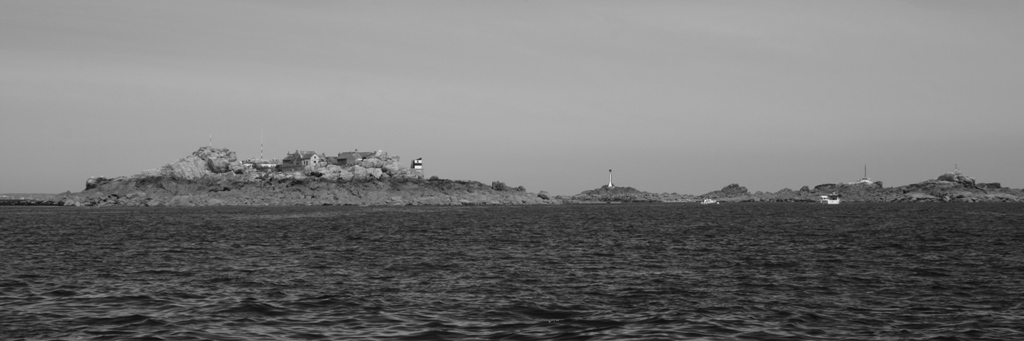
Minquiers looking at the inner basin from the South.

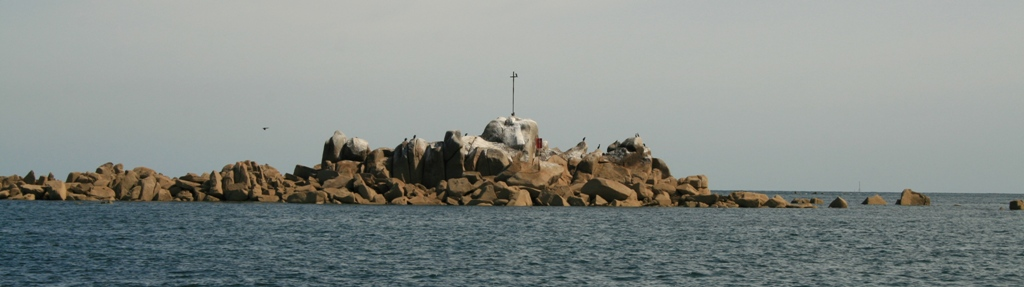
Minquiers looking at inner basin from the South.

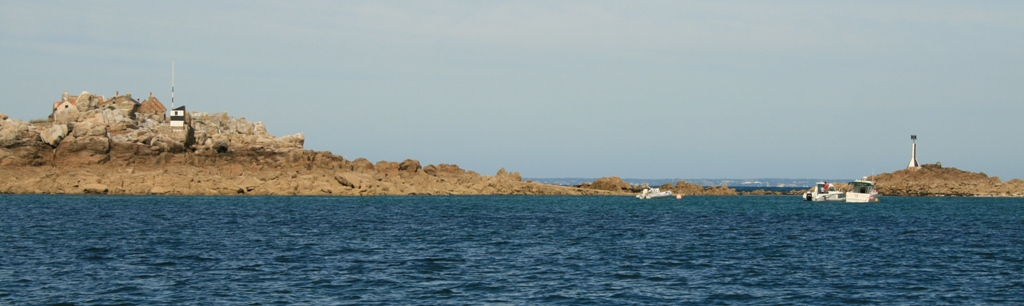
Minquiers looking at inner basin from the South.
