= Edward Paisnel =

Jersey serial sex offender

- Edward Paisnel's mugshot
- Born: Edward John Louis Paisnel; 7 May 1925; Grouville, Jersey
- Died: 29 July 1994 (aged 69); Isle of Wight
- Other name: Beast of Jersey
- Occupation: Builder
- Spouse: Joan Paisnel
- Convictions: 13 counts of assault, rape and sodomy
- Penalty: 30 years imprisonment

Edward John Louis Paisnel (7 May 1925 – 29 July 1994), dubbed the Beast of Jersey, or the Devil of Jersey, was a notorious sex offender, burglar, and serial assaulter who terrorised the Channel Island of Jersey between 1957 and 1971. He entered homes at night dressed in a rubber mask and nail-studded wristlets, attacking women and children.

Suspicion for the attacks initially fell on eccentric agricultural worker and fisherman Alphonse Le Gastelois, who was arrested but released because of a lack of evidence. Public suspicion remained so strong, however, that Le Gastelois' cottage was burnt down in an act of arson. Le Gastelois, fearing for his life, fled to Les Écréhous where he spent 14 years in self-imposed exile on La Marmotière as the second self-styled king of the Écréhous despite being cleared of suspicion when the attacks of the Beast of Jersey continued unabated.

== Capture and conviction ==
On 17 July 1971 Edward Paisnel was stopped by the police after running a red traffic light and then attempting to evade police pursuit. In the car, which he had stolen earlier that evening, police discovered several pointed sticks and elements of his "Beast" costume. In December 1971 he was convicted of 13 counts of assault, rape and sodomy and sentenced to 30 years in prison.

== Biography ==
His wife, Joan Paisnel, was the founder of a community home in Jersey where, at her request, he once played Santa Claus.

In 1972 his wife Joan Paisnel wrote the book The Beast of Jersey (published by NEL Paperbacks, ISBN 978-0450017179).

After the trial, freelance journalist Alan Shadrake became Joan Paisnel's literary agent, and ghost-wrote a first-person article with John Lisners which was published in the Sunday Mirror under the title "The Beauty & the Beast" with a photograph of Mrs Paisnel, in a ballet dance pose in white, and a police photo of her husband wearing the mask which he wore when he kidnapped and assaulted his victims. One source, however, reports that at the trial it was stated that Paisnel never wore the mask during his attacks.

== Later life ==
Edward Paisnel returned to Jersey briefly following his release from prison on 13 July 1991, but moved away due to the strength of local feeling against him. He died on the Isle of Wight on 29 July 1994.

== Popular culture ==
- Paisnel's crimes inspired the 2017 British psychological thriller Beast starring Jessie Buckley and Johnny Flynn.
