= Prescription (sovereignty transfer) =

Concept in international law

Prescription, in international law, is sovereignty transfer of a territory by the open encroachment by the new sovereign upon the territory for a prolonged period of time, acting as the sovereign, without protest or other contest by the original sovereign. It is analogous to the common law doctrine of easement by prescription for private real estate.

The doctrine legalizes de jure the de facto transfer of sovereignty caused in part by the original sovereign's extended negligence and/or neglect of the area in question. It was applied in the Island of Palmas and the Miniquiets and Ecrehos cases.
