= Alphonse Le Gastelois =

Jersey hermit (1914–2012)

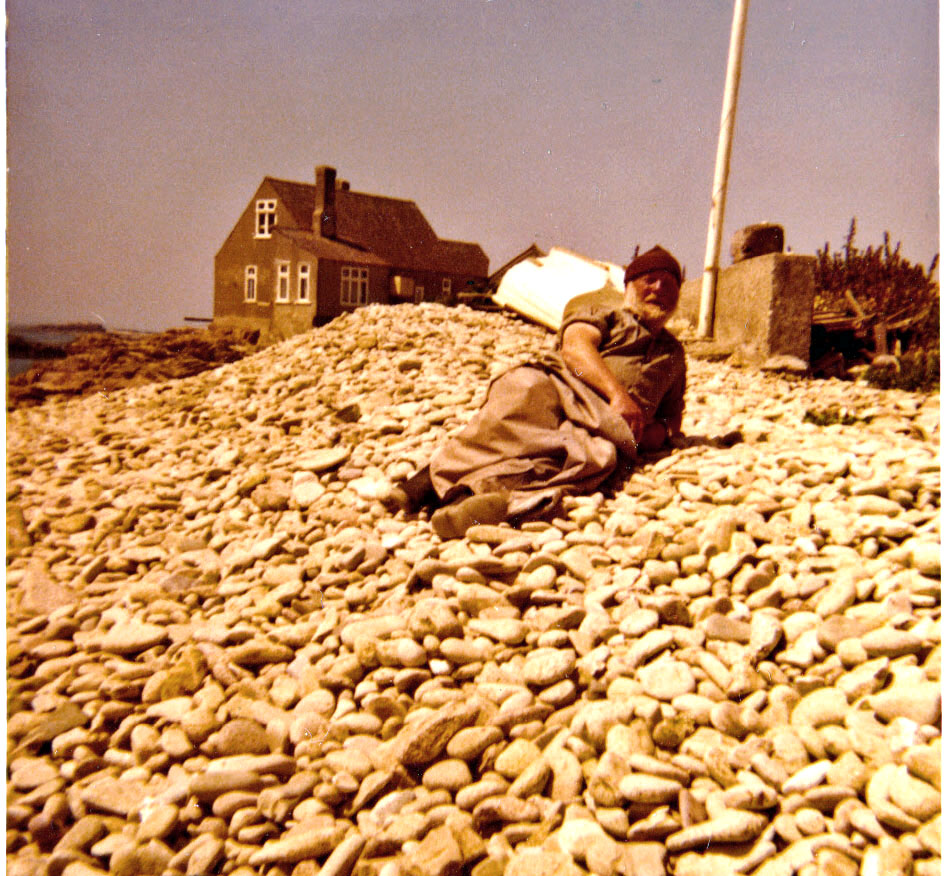
- Photo of Alphonse on Les Ecréhous, 1965–73 period
- Born: 14 October 1914; Jersey
- Died: 3 June 2012 (aged 97); Jersey
- Education: St Martin's School
- Occupations: Agricultural worker and fisherman
- Height: 1.6 m (5 ft 3 in)

Alphonse Le Gastelois (14 October 1914 – 3 June 2012) was an agricultural worker and fisherman from Jersey who lived in self-imposed exile on the Écréhous reef for 14 years after being wrongly accused of a string of sexual assaults on children. Fearing for his life, Le Gastelois felt compelled to leave Jersey to live on the small island six miles (9.7 km) to the north east of Jersey, having been treated as a criminal and ostracised by many who lived on Jersey. Ten years later, on 10 July 1971, the real criminal, Edward Paisnel, nicknamed the Beast of Jersey, was caught and on 29 November 1971, was sentenced to jail for 13 attacks; this ended an 11-year reign of terror.

== Suspicion and arrest ==
In a documentary, a journalist described how Le Gastelois liked to roam the country lanes at night. Stan de la Haye of the Honorary Police described Le Gastelois as a loner who wore a dirty old raincoat tied up with a piece of rope, which matched the description of the wanted man.

Unfounded grudges against Le Gastelois were formed in fear, and fueled by the local police force in Jersey not speaking out to silence gossip. As the hysteria reached fever pitch, Le Gastelois' unconventional lifestyle led him to become one of 30 suspects arrested during an investigation by Scotland Yard. He was released after 14 hours of questioning due to a lack of evidence. His clothes were sent for forensic examination at Scotland Yard, and on release he was issued with ill-fitting clothes. Unlike the other suspects, Le Gastelois' name was released to the public, and he became a scapegoat.

The attacks of the Beast of Jersey continued unabated. Public suspicion against Le Gastelois remained so strong, however, and his cottage was burnt down in an act of arson.

In the documentary, Le Gastelois said that the police had searched his house 12 times in 12 months.

== Exile ==
In 1961, Advocate Denys Richardson took Le Gastelois out to the reef in his boat, where Le Gastelois took on some work refurbishing the hut belonging to Advocate Richardson, and doing odd jobs for other hut owners. He described his life on the reef as "paradise compared to what I've been through."

== Reclusive life on the reef ==
From May 1961 until April 1975 and despite Paisnel's capture, Le Gastelois continued to live a quiet life of solitude on the islet of La Marmotière, explaining that he had become so used to it and it was his home with all his possessions there with him. His story became a cause célèbre and the bearded character soon established himself as the "King of the Ecréhous" and became an attraction for those visiting the reef.

The huts on the reef have no running water nor electricity. During the bitterly cold winters, there would be no visitors to the islands for months at a time. To survive, he lived off the land as best he could, becoming expert at finding lobsters in the expanse of rock pools at low tide. He collected rain water, and his diet also included seaweed and seagull eggs. Visitors to the reef would often bring him supplies and books from Jersey. He said in an interview that he did not like the fish but preferred the seaweed. To keep warm he would pull two tables together, cover them with a blanket to make a tent and then light a candle or small fire inside it.

== King of the Ecréhous ==
Exonerated, Le Gastelois remained on the Écréhous where he formed the firm conviction based on what he had read in the law books given to him by visitors that the archipelago could become an independent entity since they were not permanently occupied. He claimed that status pursuant to Norman law in force since Rollo in 911, which provides that a person can claim possession of a deserted place if he lives there for 10 years. His request was formally submitted to the Queen, not as Queen of the United Kingdom of Great Britain and Northern Ireland but in her capacity as Duke of Normandy. His request was unsuccessful and the Écréhous remained a possession of the Bailiwick of Jersey.

== Accusation of arson ==
After Le Gastelois lived for 14 years as a hermit, in 1975 a posse of officials from Jersey went to the reef to exterminate rabbits which were said to be destroying what little vegetation existed there. As they were returning to Jersey, the biggest building on the reef, a hut belonging to Lady Trent, caught fire and was destroyed. The rabbits were a source of food for Le Gastelois, who was arrested and accused of lighting the fire as an act of revenge. He was imprisoned for three months on remand, but at his subsequent Royal Court trial he was unanimously acquitted by the 24-strong jury who took just minutes to reach their 'not guilty' verdict.

== Return to Jersey ==
Despite saying that he had no reason to go back to Jersey, Le Gastelois did not return to the Écréhous and remained in Jersey from 1975 until his death in June 2012. He moved into a single room at the rear end of a cottage in Dumaresq Street, St. Helier owned by the States of Jersey. He mostly kept himself locked in. He suffered severe back pain which impaired his ability to walk very far. Having received no pension he was living in extreme poverty.

Later he lived at Victoria Cottage Homes for three years, then Guardian Nursing Home for another three years and then the last 18 months of his life at Palm Springs nursing home.

== Interviews and documentary ==
Le Gastelois gave an interview to Channel Television in 1964 and to the Jersey Evening Post in 1966. In 1998, he was the subject of an award-winning 24-minute documentary.

== Proposed compensation ==
In 1999, The States of Jersey debated a proposition brought by Senator J.S. Rothwell to pay Le Gastelois £20,000 in compensation as a token of support to redress the injustice that he had suffered. In a BBC interview, he was quoted as saying "What can you do? You can't rebuild my life, you can't rebuild me. I don't want much now, only want to be left in peace." He said of the proposed compensation: "It's a bit late in life but it will help."

The Finance and Economics Committee presented written comments to the States, expressing their sympathy for Le Gastelois' circumstances but in their opinion paying compensation could establish a precedent. After the States voted in favour of holding the debate in camera, Rothwell withdrew his proposition.

== Family ==
Le Gastelois never married, and he left no children. His nephew William Du Heaume and wife Valerie Du Heaume along with their family still live on the island. Valerie Du Heaume looked after him when his health failed. She has called for the States of Jersey to make a public apology, and for a memorial to him to be placed on the reef.

== Memorial ==
Amongst the many friends that attended his funeral were nine expert mariners from Normandy who had been amongst Le Gastelois' most frequent visitors during his exile, including Alain Blancheton, former harbourmaster of Carteret who gave the eulogy.

Shortly after Le Gastelois' death, a Facebook group was set up to gain public support for a suitable memorial. St Martin's honorary police also expressed interest. The Facebook group has suggested "Wrongly Accused; forgive us" as a suitable epitaph. A letter to the editor of the Jersey Evening Post suggested that Jersey Heritage which each year commissions a portrait of one of the Island's well known citizens should select Le Gastelois as its next subject.

== Theatrical performance ==
Andrea Earl has written a play about Le Gastelois' life. It was performed for the first time at Jersey Opera House on 28 October 2014, the month being the 100th anniversary of his birth.
