= Minquiers and Ecrehos case =

Minquiers and Ecrehos Case
- Court: International Court of Justice
- Full case name: Minquiers and Ecrehos (France/United Kingdom)
- Decided: 17 November 1953

France v United Kingdom [1953] ICJ 3 (also called the Minquiers and Ecrehos Case) was an International Court of Justice case concerning sovereignty over seas.

== Facts ==
The United Kingdom and France requested the ICJ to determine the country that held sovereignty over the islets and rocks in the Minquiers and Ecrehos groups. France claimed sovereignty because it fished in the waters and it had historic sovereignty over the area from the 11th century's Duchy of Normandy. The United Kingdom claimed that Jersey had historically exercised legal and administrative jurisdiction over them.

== Judgment ==
Initially requested in 1951, the ICJ decided on 17 November 1953 that sovereignty over the islands belonged to the United Kingdom. They based this decision on evidence that throughout the 19th Century, Jersey exercised various administrative measures on the islands. This included criminal prosecutions, taxation, coroner's inquests, boat registrations, and censusus.

The court found that France's claim based on Norman law was inconclusive, as ownership of the Minquiers and Ecrehos were never explicitly referenced in the historical treaties between France and England. Additionally, while France had frequently claimed the right for its citizens to fish in the area, the court found little evidence that France historically claimed ownership over the islands themselves.

== See also ==
- List of International Court of Justice cases
- Prescription (sovereignty transfer)
