= Minihi =

Breton term meaning a sacred space

Minihi (also Minihy, Minic'hi) is a Breton term meaning a sacred space. Its etymology is Latin, being derived from the term monachia, meaning "monastic territory".

== Toponymy ==
Minihi comes from Greek via the Latin word monachus, monk. In Breton, this developed to minihi, which at first meant "place sanctified by the presence of a saint" and later also "place of refuge".
