= Les Dirouilles =

Coordinates: 49.333°N 2.083°W

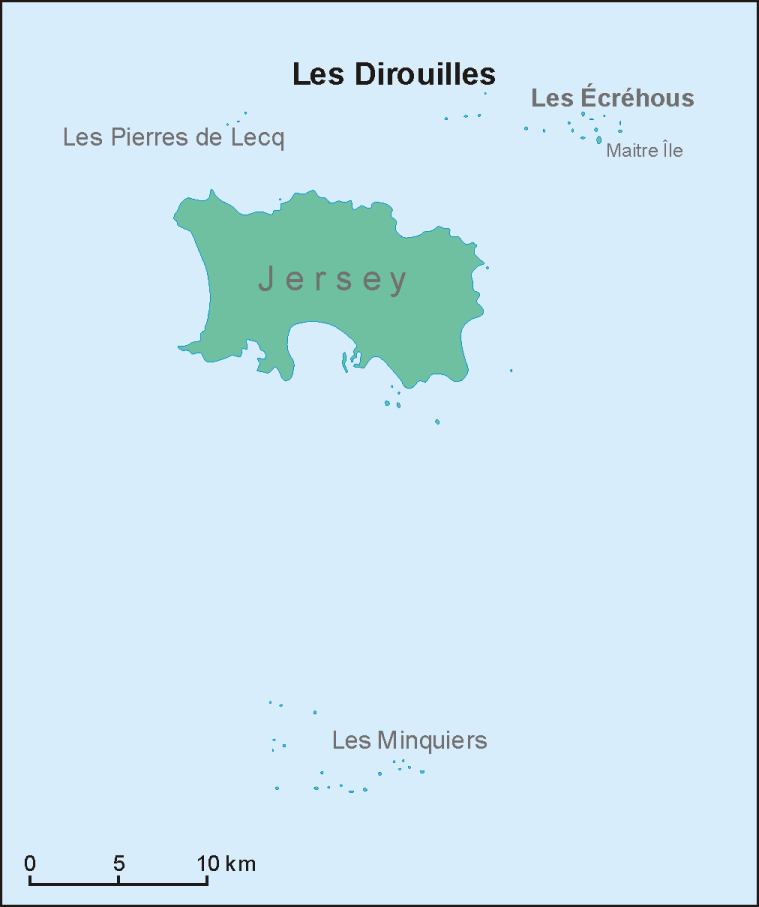
- Location of Les Dirouilles

Ramsar Wetland
- Official name: Les Écréhous & Les Dirouilles, Jersey
- Designated: 2 February 2005
- Reference no.: 1455

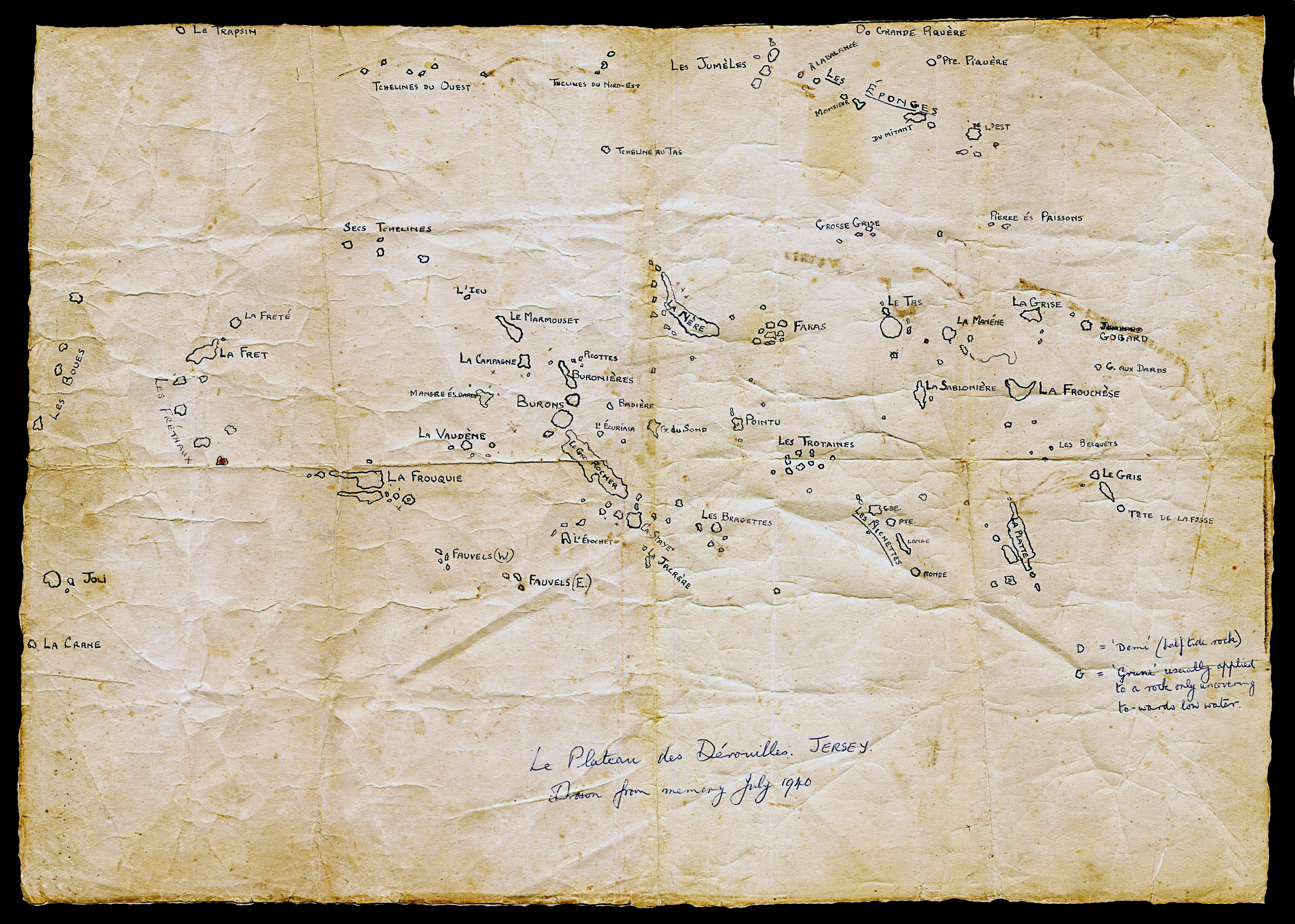
1940 hand-drawn map of Les Dirouilles

Les Dirouilles (French pronunciation: [le diʁuj]; Jèrriais: Les Dithouïl'yes) are a range of rocks to the North-East of Jersey. Historically and administratively, they belong to the parish of Saint Martin.

They have a large range of names, taken individually, and are also known as just Les Pièrres (the rocks).
