= Same-sex marriage in Guernsey =

Same-sex marriage is legal in all parts of the Bailiwick of Guernsey, a Crown Dependency of the United Kingdom. Legislation to open marriage to same-sex couples in Guernsey was passed 33–5 by the States of Guernsey on 21 September 2016, and took effect on 2 May 2017. Same-sex marriage laws took effect in Alderney on 14 June 2018, and Sark on 23 April 2020.

The Bailiwick of Guernsey has never recognised civil partnerships, and prior to 2017 was the sole region in the British Isles to not recognise same-sex couples in any form.

== Recognition of foreign unions ==
Laws regarding same-sex partnerships in Europe¹ Marriage Civil union Limited domestic recognition (cohabitation) Unrecognized Constitution limits marriage to opposite-sex couples ¹ May include recent laws or court decisions that have not yet entered into effect.

Civil partnerships performed in the United Kingdom under the Civil Partnership Act 2004 have been recognised in Guernsey for succession purposes since 2 April 2012, after approval of a bill allowing such recognition by the States of Guernsey on 29 June 2011. The bill received royal assent in the Privy Council on 16 November and was registered in the records of the island on 5 December 2011. On 10 December 2015, the States approved an ordinance to recognise same-sex marriages and civil partnerships performed abroad for the purposes of the Income Tax (Guernsey) Law, 1975. It took effect on 1 January 2017. On the same day, the States directed the preparation of legislation to amend the Inheritance (Guernsey) Law, 2011 to recognise foreign same-sex marriages for inheritance purposes. A bill to this effect was submitted on 22 January 2016, and was approved by the States on 2 March. It received royal assent in the Privy Council on 4 May and took effect on 16 May 2016.

On 17 June 2015, the States of Alderney unanimously approved the Inheritance (Alderney) Law, 2015, which includes provisions to recognise same-sex marriages and civil partnerships performed abroad. The bill received royal assent in the Privy Council on 8 October, was registered in the records of the island on 9 November 2015, and took effect on 1 January 2016.

== Same-sex marriage ==
=== Guernsey ===
In January 2014, it was announced that within the next twelve months deputies would debate whether to accept a state-recognised civil union proposal. The proposed law, titled Union Civile (French: [ynjɔ̃ sivil]; Guernésiais: parchounerie civile; Sercquiais: parchunnii civile), was said to be "the most forward-looking marriage law" in the world. The measure would have ended state-sanctioned marriages of any couple and instead replaced it with Union Civile. A consultation on the proposed law began on 1 June 2015 and lasted until 13 July. The law would only apply to the islands of Guernsey, Herm, Jethou and Lihou. On 14 July, the results of the consultation indicated that over 1,600 responses had been filed, with the majority supporting the introduction of a same-sex marriage law rather than a partnership law. On 30 October, the Policy Council of Guernsey dropped the Union Civile plans and released a report asking the States to agree on introducing a same-sex marriage law. The States approved the proposal on 10 December 2015 in a 37–7 vote. Amendments to introduce civil partnerships or Union Civile rather than same-sex marriage were rejected.

10 December 2015 vote in the States
Electoral district	Voted for	Voted against	Absent (Did not vote)
Castel	4: Mark Dorey; Darren Duquemin; Christopher Green; Sandra James	2: Hunter Adam; Barry Paint	1: Jonathan Le Tocq
Saint Peter Port North	7: Elis Bebb; Richard Conder; John Gollop; Michelle Le Clerc; Charles Parkinson; Lester Queripel; Peter Sherbourne	–	–
Saint Peter Port South	5: Barry Brehaut; Roger Domaille; Peter Harwood; Robert Jones; Allister Langlois	1: Jan Kuttelwascher	–
Saint Sampson	6: Peter Gillson; Paul Le Pelley; Scott Ogier; Kevin Stewart; Gavin St Pier; Lyndon Trott	–	–
South East	5: Michael Hadley; Paul Luxon; Francis Quin; Robert Sillars; Heidi Soulsby	1: Michael O'Hara	–
Vale	5: Garry Collins; Matthew Fallaize; Andrew Le Lièvre; Mary Lowe; Anthony Spruce	1: Laurie Queripel	1: David Jones
West	4: Alvord Brouard; Yvonne Burford; Arrun Wilkie	2: David de Lisle; Roger Perrot	1: David Inglis
Alderney	2: Louis Jean; Graham McKinley	–	–
Total	37	7	3
Total	78.7%	14.9%	6.4%

In February 2016, a working group, consisting of Chief Minister Jonathan Le Tocq and deputies Elis Bebb and Christopher Green, was established in order to prepare a draft bill. A same-sex marriage bill was approved by the States in a 33–5 vote on 21 September.

21 September 2016 vote in the States
Electoral district	Voted for	Voted against	Absent (Did not vote)
Castel	4: Mark Dorey; Richard Graham; Chris Green; Jonathan Le Tocq	1: Barry Paint	–
Saint Peter Port North	5: John Gollop; Marc Leadbeater; Michelle Le Clerc; Charles Parkinson; Lester Queripel	1: Joe Mooney	–
Saint Peter Port South	4: Barry Brehaut; Peter Ferbrache; Dawn Tindall; Rhian Tooley	1: Jan Kuttelwascher	–
Saint Sampson	6: Paul Le Pelley; Carl Meerveld; Jennifer Merrett; Jane Stephens; Gavin St Pier; Lyndon Trott	–	–
South East	5: Lindsay De Sausmarez; Victoria Oliver; Rob Prow; Peter Roffey; Heidi Soulsby	–	–
Vale	3: Matt Fallaize; Sarah Hansmann Rouxel; Mary Lowe	1: Laurie Queripel	1: Jeremy Smithies
West	4: Alvord Brouard; Andrea Dudley-Owen; Shane Langlois; Emilie Yerby	1: David de Lisle	–
Alderney	2: Louis Jean; Graham McKinley	–	–
Total (Note: The States only had 39 seats at the time due to David Jones' death in July 2016)	33	5	1
Total	84.6%	12.8%	2.6%

The Same-Sex Marriage (Guernsey) Law, 2016 received royal assent in the Privy Council on 14 December 2016. It was registered in the records of the island on 16 January 2017. On 21 February, the government announced that the law would take effect on 2 May, if the ordinances to commence it and make the necessary changes to other laws were approved by the States at its meeting on 26 April. On 26 April, the States approved both ordinances, and the law took effect on 2 May 2017. It applies to the jurisdiction of Guernsey, but not to Alderney and Sark. The law contains provisions stating that:

Marriage of same-sex couples is lawful. In the law of Guernsey, whether statutory, customary or otherwise, marriage has the same effect in relation to same-sex couples as it has in relation to opposite-sex couples.

The first same-sex marriage in Guernsey was performed on 14 July 2017 between Kirsty Davison and Paula Le Page in Saint Peter Port. The first same-sex couple to marry on Herm were Rebecca and Aletia Leong in August 2022.

=== Alderney ===
Alderney, one of the three constituent Channel Islands which form the Bailiwick of Guernsey, has full autonomy in most legal matters (except foreign affairs and other powers that have been transferred to the States of Guernsey), through the States of Alderney.

On 21 February 2017, the States' Policy and Finance Committee (PFC) approved a proposal from the Chief Executive, Victor Brownlees, to draft a bill to allow same-sex marriage on Alderney. LGBT advocacy group Liberate estimated that the entire process of legalisation could take 12 months. On 16 May, the PFC agreed to bring forward the proposed Same-Sex Marriage (Alderney) Law, 2017 to a meeting of the States on a date to be determined later. On 18 July, the PFC noted that the draft law was at an advanced stage, but that consequential amendments to other legislation was required before the bill could be presented to the States of Alderney. On 12 September, the PFC unanimously approved the bill. The legislation was approved by the States on 18 October by a vote of 9 to 0 with 1 abstention. The bill received royal assent in the Privy Council on 13 December and was registered in the records of the island on 15 January 2018. On 13 June, the States approved the ordinances to commence the law and make the necessary changes to other laws, all of which came into effect on 14 June 2018. The first same-sex marriage was performed on 16 June 2018 in Platte Saline near Saint Anne.

=== Sark ===
Sark is a constituent Channel Island which forms part of the Bailiwick of Guernsey. It has legislative autonomy and legislation passed by the States of Guernsey do not apply to Sark without approval of the Chief Pleas, resulting in same-sex marriages not being performed in Sark following the passage of Guernsey's legislation. On 2 October 2019, the Chief Pleas approved a proposition directing the Policy and Finance Committee to instruct the Law Officers to draft legislation to legalise same-sex marriage on the island. A bill mirroring the provisions of the Guernsey same-sex marriage law was approved by the Chief Pleas on 17 December, and received royal assent on 11 March 2020. The Same-Sex Marriage (Sark) Law, 2019 was registered in the records of the island on 6 April. On 22 April, the Chief Pleas approved, in a unanimous 14–0 vote, the ordinances to commence the law and make the necessary changes to other laws, all of which came into effect on 23 April 2020.

Sark equestrian Carl Hester praised the legalisation of same-sex marriage on the island.

=== Statistics ===
Liberate estimated that around 70 same-sex couples had married in Guernsey in the first year of legalisation.

=== Religious performance ===
In February 2023, the General Synod of the Church of England voted 250–181 to allow clergy to bless same-sex marriages. The measure took effect on 17 December 2023. Guernsey is part of the Diocese of Salisbury, whose bishop, Stephen Lake, voted in favour of blessing same-sex unions. The Dean of Guernsey, Tim Barker, also expressed support for the blessings. The Methodist Church of Great Britain has allowed its ministers to conduct same-sex marriages since 2021. The Methodist Conference voted 254 to 46 in favour of the move in June 2021. A freedom of conscience clause allows ministers with objections to opt out of performing same-sex weddings. In January 2022, the Methodist congregation in Sark announced it would be performing same-sex weddings in its local chapel. The smaller United Reformed Church has allowed its churches to perform same-sex marriages since 2016. Quakers formally expressed support for same-sex marriage in 2009.

== See also ==
- LGBTQ rights in Guernsey
- Same-sex marriage in the United Kingdom
- Recognition of same-sex unions in Europe
