= 2000 Guernsey general election =

← 1997	12 April 2000	2004 →

45 of the 47 seats in the States of Guernsey
- Turnout: 62%

The 2000 Guernsey general election was held on 12 April 2000 to elect 45 members of the States of Guernsey.

== Results ==
=== Castel ===
Castel district
Party	Candidate	Votes	%
Independent	Eric Walters	1,622	61.7%
Independent	John Langlois	1,417	53.9%
Independent	David Nussbaumer	1,298	49.4%
Independent	Bernard Flouquet	1,253	47.6%
Independent	Thomas Le Pelley	1,245	47.3%
Independent	Geoffrey Norman	1,136	43.2%
Independent	Jonathan Le Tocq	1,068	40.6%
Independent	Barry Paint	865	32.9%
Independent	Andrew Linehan	859	32.7%
Independent	Keith Tostevin	802	30.5%
Independent	Christopher Le Page	784	29.8%
Independent	Gordon Young	309	11.7%
Total valid votes		12,658	
Rejected ballots		69	
Turnout		2,630	61%

=== Forest ===
Forest district
Party	Candidate	Votes	%
Independent	Peter Sirett	Unopposed	

=== St Andrew ===
St Andrew district
Party	Candidate	Votes	%
Independent	Andrew Sauvarin	435	65.7%
Independent	David Barrett	340	51.4%
Independent	Godfrey Le Mesurier	338	51.1%
Total valid votes		1,113	
Rejected ballots		30	
Turnout		662	56%

=== St Martin ===
St Martin district
Party	Candidate	Votes	%
Independent	Francis Quinn	1,180	68.0%
Independent	Janine Le Sauvage	1,124	64.7%
Independent	Michael Torode	1,111	64.0%
Independent	Roger Berry	1,065	61.3%
Independent	William Bell	1,003	57.8%
Independent	Hilary Meacock	299	17.2%
Independent	Douglas Hulme	181	10.4%
Total valid votes		5,963	
Rejected ballots		69	
Turnout		1,736	61%

=== St Peter Port ===
St Peter Port district
Party	Candidate	Votes	%
Independent	John Gollop	2,023	63.3%
Independent	Brian Gabriel	1,664	52.0%
Independent	Judith Beaugeard	1,660	51.9%
Independent	Laurence Morgan	1,633	51.1%
Independent	Jean Pritchard	1,386	43.4%
Independent	Rhoderick Matthews	1,338	41.9%
Independent	Francis Roper	1,303	40.8%
Independent	Brian Russell	1,246	39.0%
Independent	Anthony Webber	1,216	38.0%
Independent	Roy Bisson	1,211	37.9%
Independent	Leon Gallienne	1,185	37.1%
Independent	Michael Burbridge	1,159	36.3%
Independent	Barry Brehaut	1,138	35.6%
Independent	Thomas Reynolds	697	21.8%
Independent	Mike Garrett	660	20.6%
Independent	Peter Wilson	659	20.6%
Independent	Dave Allen	651	20.4%
Independent	Madeleine Dawson	499	15.6%
Independent	Nigel Cann	459	14.4%
Independent	Kenneth Finch	335	10.5%
Total valid votes		22,122	
Rejected ballots		86	
Turnout		3,197	57%

=== St Pierre du Bois ===
St Pierre du Bois district
Party	Candidate	Votes	%
Independent	Martin Ozanne	470	58.7%
Independent	Claire Waite	456	56.9%
Independent	David De Lisle	432	53.9%
Total valid votes		1,358	
Rejected ballots		29	
Turnout		801	72%

=== St Sampson ===
St Sampson district
Party	Candidate	Votes	%
Independent	Kevin Prevel	1,760	69.0%
Independent	Lyndon Trott	1,691	66.3%
Independent	Ivan Rihoy	1,500	58.8%
Independent	Daniel Le Cheminant	1,394	54.7%
Independent	Peter Bougourd	1,105	43.4%
Independent	Peter Falla	972	38.1%
Independent	Scott Ogier	906	35.5%
Independent	Harold Allen	858	33.7%
Independent	John O'Neill	284	11.1%
Independent	Richard Meacock	272	10.7%
Total valid votes		10,742	
Rejected ballots		62	
Turnout		2,549	66%

=== St Saviour ===
St Saviour district
Party	Candidate	Votes	%
Independent	Michael Best	490	53.6%
Independent	Ann Robilliard	429	46.9%
Independent	Stanley Bichard	391	42.8%
Independent	Michael Bourgaize	268	29.3%
Total valid votes		1,578	
Rejected ballots		25	
Turnout		914	66%

=== Torteval ===
Torteval district
Party	Candidate	Votes	%
Independent	Patricia Robilliard	Unopposed	

=== Vale ===
Vale district
Party	Candidate	Votes	%
Independent	Peter Roffey	2,582	83.8%
Independent	Mary Lowe	1,819	59.1%
Independent	David Jones	1,507	48.9%
Independent	Rodney Collenette	1,480	48.1%
Independent	Owen Le Tissier	1,440	46.8%
Independent	Patricia Mellor	1,151	37.4%
Independent	Peter Derham	1,033	33.5%
Independent	George Domaille	1,023	33.2%
Independent	Peter Johns	441	14.3%
Total valid votes		12,476	
Rejected ballots		104	
Turnout		3,080	65%

== See also ==
- Politics of Guernsey
- Elections in Guernsey
