= 2008 Guernsey general election =

| ← 2004 | 23 April 2008 | 2012 → |

45 of the 47 seats in the States of Guernsey
- Registered: 33,253
- Turnout: 55.9%

The 2008 Guernsey general election was held on 23 April 2008 to elect 45 members of the States of Guernsey. 18,576 voters or 40.58% of the eligible population of 45,772 turned out and cast a total of 89,239 votes; there were 10 blank papers, 35 spoilt papers and on average 4.8 votes were cast. Of the 28 standing deputies all but two (Brian de Jersey and Wendy Morgan), were re-elected to the house; this means that 19 of the Deputies-Elect are new to the chamber. Five of the 12 candidates who had stood unsuccessfully in 2004 were elected in 2008.

The candidate who polled the most votes was first time candidate Matt Fallaize standing in the Vale, who received 2,322 and became the youngest member of the house at 26.

Election Ordinance

On 1 May, Lyndon Trott was elected as Chief Minister of Guernsey by the newly elected deputies, with Bernard Flouquet as Deputy Chief Minister.

== Results ==
Election results

=== Castel ===
Castel district
| Party | Candidate | Votes | % |
|---|---|---|---|
| Independent | Mark Dorey (incumbent) | 1,884 | 69.2% |
| Independent | Hunter Adam (incumbent) | 1,703 | 62.5% |
| Independent | Tom Le Pelley (incumbent) | 1,528 | 56.1% |
| Independent | Sean McManus | 1,478 | 54.3% |
| Independent | Barry Paint | 1,279 | 47.0% |
| Independent | Bernard Flouquet (incumbent) | 1,180 | 43.3% |
| Independent | Mike Garrett | 1,162 | 42.7% |
| Independent | Keith Tostevin | 1,056 | 38.8% |
| Independent | Jo Spinks | 874 | 32.1% |
| Independent | Gillian Tidd | 782 | 28.7% |
| Independent | Jean Knight | 501 | 18.4% |
| Independent | Gordon Young | 229 | 8.4% |
| Total valid votes | | 13,656 | |
| Rejected ballots | | 11 | |
| Turnout | | 2,723 | 54.49% |
| Registered electors | | 4,983 | |

=== South East ===
South East district
| Party | Candidate | Votes | % |
|---|---|---|---|
| Independent | Charles Parkinson (incumbent) | 2,256 | 78.7% |
| Independent | Francis Quin (incumbent) | 1,625 | 56.7% |
| Independent | Mike O'Hara (incumbent) | 1,576 | 55.0% |
| Independent | Robert Sillars | 1,477 | 51.5% |
| Independent | Janine Le Sauvage (incumbent) | 1,349 | 47.0% |
| Independent | Mike Hadley | 1,309 | 45.6% |
| Independent | Vanessa Crispini-Adams | 1,174 | 40.9% |
| Independent | Robert Gregson | 1,061 | 37.0% |
| Independent | Lorraine Marson | 770 | 26.8% |
| Independent | Ivan Roberts | 411 | 14.3% |
| Independent | Tony Corbin | 223 | 7.8% |
| Total valid votes | | 13,231 | |
| Rejected ballots | | 6 | |
| Turnout | | 2,868 | 57% |
| Registered electors | | 5,019 | |

=== St Peter Port North ===
St Peter Port North district
| Party | Candidate | Votes | % |
|---|---|---|---|
| Independent | John Gollop (incumbent) | 1,579 | 71.9% |
| Independent | Rhoderick Matthews (incumbent) | 1,204 | 54.8% |
| Independent | Carol Steere | 1,010 | 46.0% |
| Independent | Martin Storey | 999 | 45.5% |
| Independent | Jack Honeybill (incumbent) | 980 | 44.6% |
| Independent | Leon Gallienne (incumbent) | 976 | 44.4% |
| Independent | Mike Collins | 896 | 40.8% |
| Independent | Roy Bisson | 816 | 37.2% |
| Independent | Wendy Morgan (incumbent) | 763 | 34.7% |
| Independent | Lester Queripel | 582 | 26.5% |
| Independent | Peter Wilson | 570 | 26.0% |
| Independent | Anthony Walkington | 279 | 12.7% |
| Independent | Steve Le Prevost | 250 | 11.4% |
| Independent | Rosemary Henderson | 230 | 10.5% |
| Total valid votes | | 11,134 | |
| Rejected ballots | | 7 | |
| Turnout | | 2,196 | 49.16% |
| Registered electors | | 4,476 | |

=== St Peter Port South ===
St Peter Port South district
| Party | Candidate | Votes | % |
|---|---|---|---|
| Independent | Barry Brehaut (incumbent) | 989 | 58.3% |
| Independent | Carla McNulty Bauer (incumbent) | 935 | 55.1% |
| Independent | Jenny Tasker (incumbent) | 909 | 53.6% |
| Independent | Roger Domaille | 884 | 52.1% |
| Independent | Allister Langlois | 865 | 51.0% |
| Independent | Jan Kuttelwascher | 770 | 45.4% |
| Independent | Richard Whitford | 651 | 38.4% |
| Independent | Keith Wilen | 607 | 35.8% |
| Independent | Matt Waterman | 310 | 18.3% |
| Independent | Tony Webber | 241 | 14.2% |
| Independent | Steve Brooks | 224 | 13.2% |
| Independent | Peter Burtenshaw | 220 | 13.0% |
| Independent | Sue Cotterill | 107 | 6.3% |
| Independent | Christopher O'Doherty | 18 | 1.1% |
| Total valid votes | | 7,730 | |
| Rejected ballots | | 3 | |
| Turnout | | 1,697 | 50.47% |
| Registered electors | | 3,370 | |

=== St Sampson ===
St Sampson district
| Party | Candidate | Votes | % |
|---|---|---|---|
| Independent | Peter Gillson | 1,687 | 61.2% |
| Independent | Sam Maindonald (incumbent) | 1,386 | 50.3% |
| Independent | Scott Ogier (incumbent) | 1,375 | 49.9% |
| Independent | Ivan Rihoy (incumbent) | 1,337 | 48.5% |
| Independent | Lyndon Trott (incumbent) | 1,181 | 42.9% |
| Independent | Jane Stephens | 1,095 | 39.7% |
| Independent | Andy Bichard | 928 | 33.7% |
| Independent | John Duquemin | 861 | 31.3% |
| Independent | David Cranch | 846 | 30.7% |
| Independent | Brian Harris | 694 | 25.2% |
| Independent | Robert Broome | 612 | 22.2% |
| Independent | Andrew Barham | 535 | 19.4% |
| Independent | Glen Smith | 137 | 5.0% |
| Total valid votes | | 12,674 | |
| Rejected ballots | | 8 | |
| Turnout | | 2,755 | 55.97% |
| Registered electors | | 4,848 | |

=== Vale ===
Vale district
| Party | Candidate | Votes | % |
|---|---|---|---|
| Independent | Matt Fallaize | 2,322 | 68.5% |
| Independent | Geoff Mahy (incumbent) | 2,128 | 62.7% |
| Independent | Tony Spruce | 2,099 | 61.9% |
| Independent | Mary Lowe (incumbent) | 1,757 | 51.8% |
| Independent | Graham Guille (incumbent) | 1,741 | 51.3% |
| Independent | Dave Jones (incumbent) | 1,731 | 51.0% |
| Independent | Andrew Le Lievre | 1,342 | 39.6% |
| Independent | Brian De Jersey (incumbent) | 1,232 | 36.3% |
| Independent | Lee Van Katwyk | 1,047 | 30.9% |
| Independent | Peter Du Port | 902 | 26.6% |
| Independent | Laurie Queripel | 825 | 24.3% |
| Independent | Peter Leigh | 348 | 10.3% |
| Total valid votes | | 17,474 | |
| Rejected ballots | | 5 | |
| Turnout | | 3,392 | 60.06% |
| Registered electors | | 5,651 | |

=== West ===
West district
| Party | Candidate | Votes | % |
|---|---|---|---|
| Independent | Al Brouard (incumbent) | 2,202 | 74.8% |
| Independent | David de Lisle (incumbent) | 1,682 | 57.1% |
| Independent | Marc Laine | 1,645 | 55.9% |
| Independent | Shane Langlois | 1,300 | 44.1% |
| Independent | Peter Sirett (incumbent) | 1,265 | 43% |
| Independent | Gloria Dudley-Owen | 1,205 | 40.9% |
| Independent | Arrun Wilkie | 1,050 | 35.7% |
| Independent | David Gorvel | 1,007 | 34.2% |
| Independent | Paul Domaille | 932 | 31.6% |
| Independent | Mimi Byrom | 595 | 20.2% |
| Independent | Robert Plumley | 390 | 13.2% |
| Independent | Nara Le Noury | 67 | 2.3% |
| Total valid votes | | 13,340 | |
| Rejected ballots | | 5 | |
| Turnout | | 2,945 | 60.1% |
| Registered electors | | 4,906 | |

== See also ==
- Politics of Guernsey
- Elections in Guernsey
