= 2004 Guernsey general election =

← 2000	21 April 2004	2008 →

45 of the 47 seats in the States of Guernsey
- Turnout: 65%

The 2004 Guernsey general election was held on 21 April 2004 to elect 45 members of the States of Guernsey. All 45 elected members were independents.

The Elections Ordinance, 2004 came into force on 12 January.

There was a by-election in September 2005 to fill a vacancy in the district of St Peter Port South.

== Electoral system ==
The members of the States of Guernsey were elected via plurality-at-large voting in seven districts, with each district electing either six or seven members.

== Results ==
=== Castel ===
Castel district
Party	Candidate	Votes	%
Independent	Stuart Falla	2,219	74.2%
Independent	Mark Dorey	1,875	62.7%
Independent	Eric Walters (incumbent)	1,840	61.6%
Independent	Jonathan Le Tocq (incumbent)	1,602	53.6%
Independent	Bernard Flouquet (incumbent)	1,593	53.3%
Independent	Alexander Hunter Adam (incumbent)	1,462	48.9%
Independent	Thomas Le Pelley (incumbent)	1,081	36.2%
Independent	Gillian Tidd	976	32.7%
Independent	Michael Garrett	925	30.9%
Independent	Mark Bisson	560	18.7%
Total valid votes		14,133	
Rejected ballots		2	
Turnout		2,989	65.3%
Registered electors		4,594	

=== South East ===
South East district
Party	Candidate	Votes	%
Independent	Michael Torode (incumbent)	1,902	59.9%
Independent	Charles Parkinson	1,688	53.2%
Independent	William Bell (incumbent)	1,526	48.1%
Independent	Francis Quin (incumbent)	1,439	45.4%
Independent	Janine Le Sauvage (incumbent)	1,281	40.4%
Independent	Mike O'Hara (incumbent)	1,233	38.9%
Independent	Robert Gregson	1,209	38.1%
Independent	John Cleal (incumbent)	1,132	35.7%
Independent	Cynthia Cormack	1,027	32.4%
Independent	David Gorvel	839	26.4%
Independent	Aidan Matthews	804	25.3%
Independent	Hugh Bougourd	687	21.7%
Independent	John McQuaigue	501	15.8%
Total valid votes		15,268	
Rejected ballots		0	
Turnout		3,173	68.78%
Registered electors		4,619	

=== St Peter Port North ===
St Peter Port North district
Party	Candidate	Votes	%
Independent	Leon Gallienne (incumbent)	1,232	55.3%
Independent	Jack Honeybill	1,068	48.0%
Independent	Rhoderick Matthews (incumbent)	1,027	46.1%
Independent	Jean Pritchard (incumbent)	982	44.1%
Independent	Chris Brock	931	41.8%
Independent	Wendy Morgan	820	36.8%
Independent	Diane Lewis	804	36.1%
Independent	John Guilbert	760	34.1%
Independent	Peter Wilson	620	27.8%
Independent	Barry Cash	579	26.0%
Independent	Anthony Webber (incumbent)	542	24.3%
Independent	Sean McManus	530	23.8%
Independent	Thomas Reynolds	494	22.2%
Independent	Leigh Haines	322	14.5%
Independent	Philip Capper	139	6.2%
Total valid votes		10,850	
Rejected ballots		0	
Turnout		2,227	57.5%
Registered electors		3,873	

=== St Peter Port South ===
St Peter Port South district
Party	Candidate	Votes	%
Independent	Laurie Morgan (incumbent)	1,074	60.8%
Independent	Brian Gabriel (incumbent)	999	56.6%
Independent	John Gollop (incumbent)	974	55.2%
Independent	Carla McNaulty Bauer	854	48.4%
Independent	Barry Brehaut	759	43.0%
Independent	Michael Burbridge (incumbent)	758	42.9%
Independent	Roy Bisson (incumbent)	744	42.2%
Independent	Gloria Dudley-Owen	553	31.3%
Independent	Jan Kuttelwascher	468	26.5%
Independent	Alan Thoume	291	16.5%
Independent	Dave Allen	287	16.3%
Total valid votes		7,761	
Rejected ballots		4	
Turnout		1,765	59.27%
Registered electors		2,969	

=== St Sampson ===
St Sampson district
Party	Candidate	Votes	%
Independent	Lyndon Trott (incumbent)	1,707	60.4%
Independent	Daniel Le Cheminant (incumbent)	1,669	59.0%
Independent	Sam Maindonald (incumbent)	1,620	57.3%
Independent	Scott Ogier	1,439	50.9%
Independent	Ivan Rihoy (incumbent)	1,359	48.1%
Independent	Ron Le Moignan	1,212	42.9%
Independent	Michelle Levrier (incumbent)	1,120	39.6%
Independent	Peter Bougourd (incumbent)	980	34.7%
Independent	Harold Allen	680	24.1%
Independent	Keith Tostevin	650	23.0%
Independent	John O'Neill	355	12.6%
Total valid votes		12,791	
Rejected ballots		6	
Turnout		2,827	64.26%
Registered electors		4,405	

=== Vale ===
Vale district
Party	Candidate	Votes	%
Independent	Geoff Mahy	2,277	64.7%
Independent	Peter Roffey (incumbent)	2,073	58.9%
Independent	David Jones (incumbent)	2,008	57.0%
Independent	Mary Lowe (incumbent)	1,878	53.3%
Independent	Graham Guille (incumbent)	1,796	51.0%
Independent	Brian De Jersey (incumbent)	1,492	42.4%
Independent	Duncan Staples	1,448	41.1%
Independent	Peter Derham (incumbent)	1,302	37.0%
Independent	Paul Mees	1,259	35.8%
Independent	Richard Brache	1,243	35.3%
Independent	Peter Leigh	581	16.5%
Total valid votes		17,357	
Rejected ballots		1	
Turnout		3,521	67.7%
Registered electors		5,205	

=== West ===
West district
Party	Candidate	Votes	%
Independent	David Grut	1,860	65.2%
Independent	Martin Ozanne (incumbent)	1,780	62.4%
Independent	David De Lisle	1,581	55.4%
Independent	Claire Le Pelley (incumbent)	1,344	47.1%
Independent	Peter Sirett (incumbent)	1,239	43.4%
Independent	Al Brouard	1,230	43.1%
Independent	Michael Best (incumbent)	1,202	42.1%
Independent	Shane Langlois	1,095	38.4%
Independent	Susan Ephgrave (incumbent)	947	33.2%
Independent	Ann Robilliard (incumbent)	876	30.7%
Independent	Michael Bourgaize	510	17.9%
Total valid votes		13,664	
Rejected ballots		3	
Turnout		2,854	64%
Registered electors		4,470	

== See also ==
- Politics of Guernsey
- Elections in Guernsey
