= 2023 in Guernsey =

Events in the year 2023 in Guernsey.

== Incumbents ==
- Duke of Normandy: Charles III
- Lieutenant governor: Richard Cripwell
- Chief minister: Peter Ferbrache (until 13 December); Lyndon Trott onwards
- Bailiff: Richard McMahon

== Events ==
- July: The Guernsey Development Agency is established.

== Sports ==
- July: 2023 Island Games
