= 2015 St Peter Port North by-election =

← 2012	2 December 2015	2016 →

St Peter Port North district
- Registered: 3,220
- Turnout: 27%
Deputy before election
Martin Storey
Elected Deputy
Charles Parkinson

The 2015 St Peter Port North by-election was held in the States of Guernsey district of St Peter Port North on 2 December 2015 following the death of deputy Martin Storey in July 2015.

3,224 residents were eligible to vote, a reduction to 86% of those who had been eligible for the 2012 election. There was some controversy over holding a by-election as the cost is estimated at £51,100 to elect someone to sit as a deputy for just five months, especially when the number of deputies and therefore seats will be reduced in April 2016.

There were three by-election candidates, Mike Henderson, David Noakes, and Charles Parkinson. There were 3,220 registered voters and the turnout was 883 (27%). Parkinson won with 571 votes, Henderson received 184, and Noakes 109.

== Result ==
2015 St Peter Port North by-election
Party	Candidate	Votes	%
Independent	Charles Parkinson	571	64.7%
Independent	Michael Henderson	184	20.8%
Independent	David Noakes	109	12.3%
Majority		387	43.9%
Total valid votes		864	
Rejected ballots		19	
Turnout		883	27%
Registered electors		3,220	
