= 2003 St Sampson by-election =

← 2000	12 November 2003	2004 →

St Sampson district
- Turnout: 19.13%
Deputy before election
Peter Falla
Elected Deputy
Sam Maindonald

The 2003 St Sampson by-election was held in the States of Guernsey district of St Sampson on 12 November 2003, following the death of deputy Peter Falla in August 2003. Sam Maindonald was elected as the new deputy.

== Result ==
2003 St Sampson by-election
Party	Candidate	Votes	%
Independent	Sam Maindonald	432	60%
Independent	Keith Tostevin	288	40%
Majority		144	20%
Total valid votes		720	
Turnout			19.13%
