= 2003 Vale by-election =

← 2000	9 July 2003	2004 →

Vale district
- Registered: 4,665
- Turnout: 20%
Deputy before election
Rodney Collenette
Elected Deputy
Graham Guille

The 2003 Vale by-election was held in the States of Guernsey district of Vale on 9 July 2003, following the resignation of deputy Rodney Collenette due to ill health. Graham Guille was elected as the new deputy.

== Result ==
2003 Vale by-election
Party	Candidate	Votes	%
Independent	Graham Guille	420	43.2%
Independent	Richard Brache	252	25.9%
Independent	John McQuaigue	249	25.6%
Independent	Peter Falla	38	3.9%
Majority		168	17.3
Rejected ballots		14	
Turnout		973	20%
Registered electors		4,665	
