= Politics of Guernsey =

The politics of Guernsey takes place in a framework of a self-governing parliamentary representative democratic British Crown dependency.

The Bailiwick of Guernsey has an unwritten constitution arising from the Treaty of Paris (1259). When Henry III and the King of France came to terms over the Duchy of Normandy, the Norman mainland fell under the suzerainty of the King of France. The Channel Islands however remained loyal to the British crown due to the loyalties of its Seigneurs. But they were never absorbed into the Kingdom of England by any Act of Union and exist as "peculiars of the Crown".

== Offices ==
Main office-holders
| Office | Name | Party | Since |
|---|---|---|---|
| Lieutenant Governor | Lieutenant General Richard Cripwell | | 15 February 2022 |
| Bailiff | Richard McMahon | | 11 May 2020 |
| President of Policy and Resources Committee | Deputy Lindsay de Sausmarez | | 01 July 2025 |

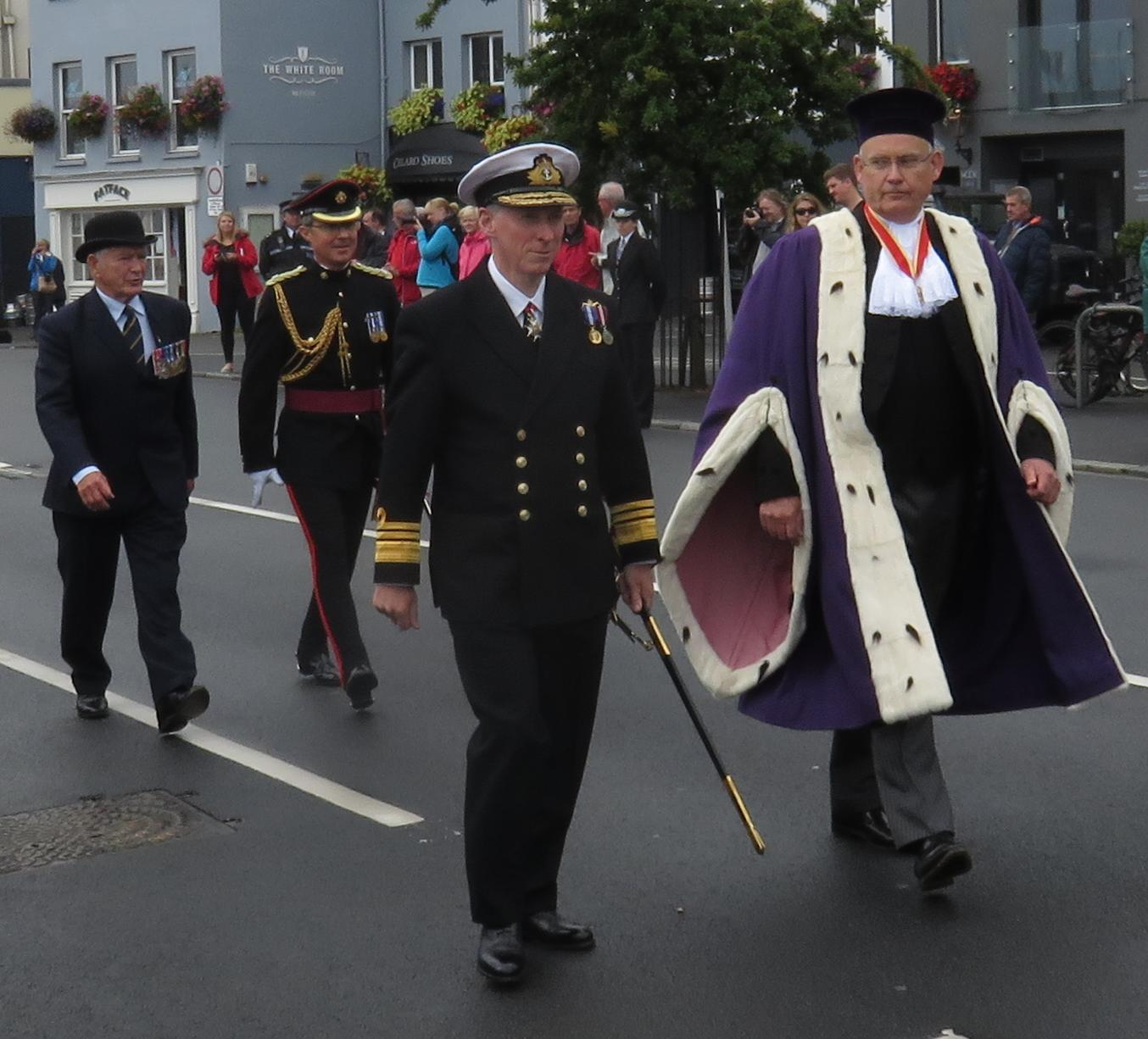
Lt. Governor Ian Corder (middle) and Bailiff Richard Collas (right) attending the Queen's birthday parade 2016 in St. Peter Port, Guernsey

The Lieutenant Governor is the appointed unelected representative of "the Crown in right of the république of the Bailiwick of Guernsey". The official residence of the Lieutenant Governor is Government House, Queens Road, St Peter Port. From 15 April 2011, the incumbent had been Peter Walker until his death on 6 September 2015.

The Bailiff is the first civil officer in the Bailiwick of Guernsey, serving as president of the legislature and the Royal Court. The Bailiff is appointed by the Crown, and generally holds office until retirement age (65). He presides at the Royal Court, and takes the opinions of the Jurats, elected lay judges; he also presides over States meetings, and represents the Crown in all civil matters.

The president of the Policy and Resources Committee, who can also be termed the Chief Minister is head of the political States of Deliberation.

== The States of Deliberation ==
The States of Guernsey, officially called the States of Deliberation, consists of 38 People's Deputies, elected from multi-member districts every four years. There are also two representatives from Alderney, a self-governing dependency within the Bailiwick, but Sark sends no representative. There are also two non-voting members - HM Procureur and HM Comptroller, appointed by the Crown.

Laws made by the States are known as Projet(s) de Loi before they are passed and Loi or Law(s) afterwards (e.g., The Human Rights (Bailiwick of Guernsey) Law 2000.

A Project de Loi is the equivalent of an English Bill, and a Law is the equivalent of an English Act of Parliament. Laws have no effect until Royal assent is promulgated as Orders-in-Council of the Crown. They are given the Royal Sanction at regular meetings of the Privy Council in London after, which they are returned to the Islands for formal registration at the Royal Court.

The States also make delegated legislation known as Ordinances (Ordonnances) and Orders (Ordres) which do not require Royal Assent. Commencement orders are usually in the form of Ordinances.

== Policy and Resources Committee ==
The Policy and Resources Committee is responsible for Guernsey's constitutional and external affairs, developing strategic and corporate policy and coordinating states business. It also examines proposals and reports placed before Guernsey's Parliament (the States of Deliberation) by departments and non states bodies. The president of the committee is the de facto head of government of Guernsey.

Prior to 2016 the job was undertaken by the Policy Council of Guernsey which was chaired by the Chief Minister.

== Political parties and elections ==
Guernsey has three political parties: the Alliance Party Guernsey, the Guernsey Party, and Forward Guernsey. The Alliance Party was registered in February 2020 and was the first party to be formed on the Island. A third registered party, the Guernsey Partnership of Independents, claims not to be a party in the conventional sense as its members are free to set their own manifestos which may differ from the party manifesto, and are not subject to the whip.

The 1948 Reform Law resulted in the 12 Jurats and 10 Parish Rectors no longer forming part of the States of Deliberation, their place being taken by 12 Conseillers holding office for 6 years, elected by the States of Election.

In 2000 there were 33 Deputies elected with three-year mandates, and 12 Conseillers representing the Bailiwick, serving terms of six years, with half being elected every three. The Conseiller system was scrapped for the 2004 election.

In the 2004, 2008 and 2012 elections there were 45 Deputy seats for election. From 2016 the number of Deputy seats was reduced to 38.

In addition there are two representatives of the States of Alderney in the States of Guernsey.

== Judicial branch ==
The legal system is derived from Norman French and English common law, justice being administered through a combination of Magistrates Court and the Royal Court. The Royal Court is presided over by the Bailiff (or Deputy Bailiff) and 12 Jurats (a permanent elected jury), the ultimate court of appeal being the Privy Council.

== Administrative divisions ==
There are ten parishes in Guernsey. Each parish is administered by a Douzaine. Douzeniers are elected for a six-year mandate, two Douzeniers being elected by parishioners at a Parish Meeting in November each year. The senior Douzenier is known as the Doyen. Two elected Constables carry out the decisions of the Douzaine, serving for between one and three years. The longest serving constable is known as the Senior Constable and the other constables are known as the Junior Constable.

Parishes: Castel, Forest, St Andrew, St Martin, St Peter, St Peter Port, St Sampson, St Saviour, Torteval and Vale

As regards General Elections, from 2020 Guernsey follows an island wide election system whereby 38 deputies are chosen by all registered voters, previously in 2004, Guernsey had seven following electoral districts, loosely based on the parish system:

== European Parliament ==
Unlike citizens of the British Overseas Territory of Gibraltar, who had a vote within the South West England constituency until Brexit in 2020, Guernsey, in common with other Crown dependencies, was never a part of the European Union and its citizens had no vote in the European Parliament.

== See also ==
- Elections in Guernsey
- Electoral firsts in Guernsey
- Policy Council of Guernsey
- Royal Commission on the Constitution (United Kingdom)
