= 2005 St Peter Port South by-election =

← 2004	21 September 2005	2008 →

St Peter Port South district
- Registered: 2,963
- Turnout: 32.5%
Deputy before election
Michael Burbridge
Elected Deputy
Jenny Tasker

The 2005 St Peter Port South by-election was held in the States of Guernsey district of St Peter Port South on 21 September 2005 following the death of deputy Michael Burbridge in June 2005. The deadline for nominations was 26 August.

There were eight candidates, Roy Bisson, Michael Bourgaize, Barry Cash, Gloria Dudley-Owen, Jan Kuttlewascher, Peter Leigh, Angus Perfitt, and Jenny Tasker. Perfitt withdrew in early September before the election, however, his name remained on the ballot. Tasker won with 306 votes.

== Result ==
2005 St Peter Port South by-election
Party	Candidate	Votes	%
Independent	Jenny Tasker	306	31.8%
Independent	Jan Kuttlewascher	204	21.2%
Independent	Barry Cash	N/A	N/A
Independent	Roy Bisson	125	13%
Independent	Gloria Dudley-Owen	N/A	N/A
Independent	Peter Leigh	58	6%
Independent	Michael Bourgaize	19	2%
Independent	Angus Perfitt	6	0.6%
Majority		102	10.6%
Turnout		963	32.5%
Registered electors		2,963	
