= 2012 Guernsey general election =

General election in Guernsey

- 18 April 2012

45 of the 47 seats in the States of Guernsey
- Registered: 29,745
- Turnout: 71.4%

The 2012 Guernsey general election was held on 18 April 2012 to elect 45 members of the States of Guernsey. 78 candidates stood for the 45 seats. A total of 29,745 people, or about two-thirds of the population of Guernsey and Herm, registered to vote. There were 20,459 voters, with 81 blank papers and 65 spoilt papers, amended to 71 blank and 72 spoilt after the two recounts. Only five women were elected in 2012.

There was a by-election in December 2015 to fill a vacancy in the district of St Peter Port North.

== Electoral system ==
The members of the States of Guernsey were elected via plurality-at-large voting in seven districts, with each district electing either six or seven members.

== Results ==
Results of the election were published by the BBC.

=== Castel ===
Castel district
Party	Candidate	Votes	%
Independent	Darren Duquemin	2,199	69%
Independent	Chris Green	2,189	69%
Independent	Mark Dorey (incumbent)	1,823	57%
Independent	Barry Paint (incumbent)	1,634	51%
Independent	Sandra James	1,575	50%
Independent	Jonathan Le Tocq (incumbent)	1,575	50%
Independent	Hunter Adam (incumbent)	1,345	42%
Independent	Sean McManus (incumbent)	1,236	39%
Independent	Mike Garrett (incumbent)	801	25%
Independent	Bernard Flouquet (incumbent)	778	24%
Independent	Martin MacIntyre	639	20%
Independent	Rolf Martin	455	14%
Independent	Dominic Mayer	330	10%
Total valid votes		16,579	
Rejected ballots		19	
Turnout		3,176	73.4%
Registered electors		4,329	

=== South East ===
South East district
Party	Candidate	Votes	%
Independent	Heidi Soulsby	2,061	68%
Independent	Robert Sillars (incumbent)	1,989	64%
Independent	Paul Luxon	1,865	62%
Independent	Mike O'Hara (incumbent)	1,609	54%
Independent	Francis Quin (incumbent)	1,168	39%
Independent	Mike Hadley (incumbent)	1,162	39%
Independent	Arthur Eldridge	1,027	34%
Independent	Martyn Mahe	937	31%
Independent	Janine Le Sauvage (incumbent)	913	30%
Independent	Aidan Matthews	881	29%
Independent	Margaret Talbot-Cull	82	3%
Total valid votes		13,694	
Rejected ballots		32	
Turnout		2,999	69.0%
Registered electors		4,346	

=== St Peter Port North ===
St Peter Port North district
Party	Candidate	Votes	%
Independent	Michelle Le Clerc	1,712	68%
Independent	John Gollop (incumbent)	1,455	58%
Independent	Peter Sherbourne	1,305	52%
Independent	Richard Conder	1,126	45%
Independent	Martin Storey (incumbent)	1,065	42%
Independent	Elis Bebb	944	37%
Independent	Lester Queripel	938	37%
Independent	Rhoderick Matthews (incumbent)	936	37%
Independent	Leon Gallienne (incumbent)	846	34%
Independent	Keith Fisher	564	22%
Independent	Mike Collins (incumbent)	555	22%
Independent	Matt Robert	472	19%
Independent	Joseph Irvin	384	15%
Independent	James Reiner	238	9%
Total valid votes		12,540	
Rejected ballots		13	
Turnout		2,522	69.0%
Registered electors		3,653	

=== St Peter Port South ===
St Peter Port South district
Party	Candidate	Votes	%
Independent	Peter Harwood	1,191	61%
Independent	Jan Kuttelwascher (incumbent)	1,072	54%
Independent	Barry Brehaut (incumbent)	938	48%
Independent	Roger Domaille (incumbent)	931	47%
Independent	Allister Langlois (incumbent)	929	47%
Independent	Rob Jones	695	35%
Independent	Jenny Tasker (incumbent)	684	35%
Independent	Hugh Bygott-Webb	683	35%
Independent	Neil Forman	577	29%
Independent	Richard Lord	553	28%
Total valid votes		8,253	
Rejected ballots		8	
Turnout		1,967	66.1%
Registered electors		2,976	

=== St Sampson ===
St Sampson district
Party	Candidate	Votes	%
Independent	Gavin St Pier	2,153	69%
Independent	Kevin Stewart	1,909	61%
Independent	Peter Gillson (incumbent)	1,469	47%
Independent	Paul Le Pelley	1,443	46%
Independent	Scott Ogier (incumbent)	1,418	45%
Independent	Lyndon Trott (incumbent)	1,370	44%
Independent	Jane Stephens (incumbent)	1,297	41%
Independent	Ivan Rihoy (incumbent)	1,168	37%
Independent	Caroline Bowker	963	31%
Independent	Sarah Breton	643	20%
Independent	Rob Broome	618	20%
Total valid votes		14,451	
Rejected ballots		35	
Turnout		3,137	73.1%
Registered electors		4,291	

=== Vale ===
Vale district
Party	Candidate	Votes	%
Independent	Matt Fallaize (incumbent)	2,909	83%
Independent	Dave Jones (incumbent)	2,430	69%
Independent	Laurie Queripel	2,345	67%
Independent	Mary Lowe (incumbent)	2,162	62%
Independent	Andrew Le Lievre (incumbent)	1,892	54%
Independent	Tony Spruce (incumbent)	1,889	54%
Independent	Garry Collins	1,275	36%
Independent	James Symons	1,232	35%
Independent	Tony Webber	358	10%
Total valid votes		16,492	
Rejected ballots		28	
Turnout		3,510	71.1%
Registered electors		4,291	

=== West ===
West district
Party	Candidate	Votes	%
Independent	Roger Perrot	2,266	71%
Independent	Al Brouard (incumbent)	1,710	54%
Independent	Arrun Wilkie	1,318	42%
Independent	David De Lisle (incumbent)	1,306	41%
Independent	Yvonne Burford	1,305	41%
Independent	David Inglis	1,292	41%
Independent	Paul Garlick	1,241	39%
Independent	Dave Gorvel	1,079	34%
Independent	Shane Langlois (incumbent)	1,058	34%
Independent	Gloria Dudley-Owen (incumbent)	1,053	33%
Total valid votes		13,628	
Rejected ballots		8	
Turnout		3,148	76.3%
Registered electors		4,126	

== See also ==
- Politics of Guernsey
- Elections in Guernsey
