= Policy Council =

Policy Council may refer to:

- Family policy council, organizations devoted to the advancement of children and family-related issues in the political sphere and society generally
- Monetary Policy Council, a body of the National Bank of Poland (NBP)
- Policy Council of Guernsey, the cabinet of ministers of Guernsey

== See also ==
- Foreign Policy Council
