= 2018 Alderney plebiscite election =

The 2018 Alderney plebiscite election was held on 17 December 2018 to elect 2 members to be nominated to represent Alderney in the States of Guernsey.

== Results ==
Candidate	Votes	%
Steve Roberts	275	19.23
Alexander Snowdon	229	16.01
David Earl	227	15.87
Graham McKinley	221	15.45
James Dent	216	15.10
Louis Jean	171	11.96
Mike Dean	91	6.36
Total	1,430	100.00
Valid votes	738	99.46
Invalid/blank votes	4	0.54
Total votes	742	100.00
Registered voters/turnout		50%
