= Saint Peter Port North =

Electoral district

- Former electoral district for the States of Guernsey
- Parish: Saint Peter Port
- Electorate: 4,059 (2016 election)

Former electoral district
- Created: 2004
- Abolished: 2020
- Seats: 6

Saint Peter Port North was an electoral district in Guernsey in the Channel Islands. It was created following the Machinery of Government changes which came into effect in 2004.

It consists of the northern part of the parish of St. Peter Port. It is divided from St. Peter Port South by the following roads: Rohais, Les Gravées, The Grange and St. Julian's Avenue.

Polling stations:

- Beau Sejour Leisure Centre, Amherst
- Princess Royal Performing Arts Centre, Les Ozouets

The district had six Deputies which represent its electorate in the States of Guernsey. In 2016 in line with the general reduction in the number of Deputies, it was reduced from seven to six.

== Members ==
Election	Member 1	Member 2	Member 3	Member 4	Member 5	Member 6	Member 7
2004	Leon Gallienne	Jack Honeybill	Rhoderick Matthews	Jean Pritchard	Wendy Morgan	Diane Lewis	Chris Brock
2008	Leon Gallienne	Jack Honeybill	Rhoderick Matthews	John Gollop	Martin Storey	Mike Collins	Carol Steere
2012	Michelle Le Clerc	Peter Sherbourne	Richard Conder	John Gollop	Martin Storey	Lester Queripel	Elis Bebb
2015 by-election	Michelle Le Clerc	Peter Sherbourne	Richard Conder	John Gollop	Charles Parkinson	Lester Queripel	Elis Bebb
2016	Michelle Le Clerc	Marc Leadbeater	Joe Mooney	John Gollop	Charles Parkinson	Lester Queripel	

== Election results ==
=== Elections in the 2010s ===
2016 Guernsey general election
Party	Candidate	Votes	%
Independent	John Gollop (incumbent)	1,472	55.8%
Independent	Charles Parkinson (incumbent)	1,379	52.3%
Independent	Lester Queripel (incumbent)	1,199	45.4%
Independent	Michelle Le Clerc (incumbent)	1,147	43.5%
Independent	Marc Leadbeater	855	32.4%
Independent	Joe Mooney	799	30.3%
Independent	Caroline McManus	765	29.0%
Independent	Timothy Bush	716	27.1%
Independent	Rhoderick Matthews	704	26.7%
Independent	Lucia Pagliarone	703	26.6%
Independent	Ivan Rihoy	698	26.4%
Independent	Michael Henderson	656	24.9%
Independent	Rob Harnish	605	22.9%
Independent	Lilita Kruze	560	21.2%
Total valid votes		12,258	
Rejected ballots		4	
Turnout		2,639	65%
Registered electors		4,059	

2015 St Peter Port North by-election
Party	Candidate	Votes	%
Independent	Charles Parkinson	571	64.7%
Independent	Michael Henderson	184	20.8%
Independent	David Noakes	109	12.3%
Majority		387	43.9%
Total valid votes		864	
Rejected ballots		19	
Turnout		883	27%
Registered electors		3,220	

2012 Guernsey general election
Party	Candidate	Votes	%
Independent	Michelle Le Clerc	1,712	68%
Independent	John Gollop (incumbent)	1,455	58%
Independent	Peter Sherbourne	1,305	52%
Independent	Richard Conder	1,126	45%
Independent	Martin Storey (incumbent)	1,065	42%
Independent	Elis Bebb	944	37%
Independent	Lester Queripel	938	37%
Independent	Rhoderick Matthews (incumbent)	936	37%
Independent	Leon Gallienne (incumbent)	846	34%
Independent	Keith Fisher	564	22%
Independent	Mike Collins (incumbent)	555	22%
Independent	Matt Robert	472	19%
Independent	Joseph Irvin	384	15%
Independent	James Reiner	238	9%
Total valid votes		12,540	
Rejected ballots		13	
Turnout		2,522	69.0%
Registered electors		3,653	

=== Elections in the 2000s ===
2008 Guernsey general election
Party	Candidate	Votes	%
Independent	John Gollop (incumbent)	1,579	71.9%
Independent	Rhoderick Matthews (incumbent)	1,204	54.8%
Independent	Carol Steere	1,010	46.0%
Independent	Martin Storey	999	45.5%
Independent	Jack Honeybill (incumbent)	980	44.6%
Independent	Leon Gallienne (incumbent)	976	44.4%
Independent	Mike Collins	896	40.8%
Independent	Roy Bisson	816	37.2%
Independent	Wendy Morgan (incumbent)	763	34.7%
Independent	Lester Queripel	582	26.5%
Independent	Peter Wilson	570	26.0%
Independent	Anthony Walkington	279	12.7%
Independent	Steve Le Prevost	250	11.4%
Independent	Rosemary Henderson	230	10.5%
Total valid votes		11,134	
Rejected ballots		7	
Turnout		2,196	49.16%
Registered electors		4,476	

2004 Guernsey general election
Party	Candidate	Votes	%
Independent	Leon Gallienne (incumbent)	1,232	55.3%
Independent	Jack Honeybill	1,068	48.0%
Independent	Rhoderick Matthews (incumbent)	1,027	46.1%
Independent	Jean Pritchard (incumbent)	982	44.1%
Independent	Chris Brock	931	41.8%
Independent	Wendy Morgan	820	36.8%
Independent	Diane Lewis	804	36.1%
Independent	John Guilbert	760	34.1%
Independent	Peter Wilson	620	27.8%
Independent	Barry Cash	579	26.0%
Independent	Anthony Webber (incumbent)	542	24.3%
Independent	Sean McManus	530	23.8%
Independent	Thomas Reynolds	494	22.2%
Independent	Leigh Haines	322	14.5%
Independent	Philip Capper	139	6.2%
Total valid votes		10,850	
Rejected ballots		0	
Turnout		2,227	57.5%
Registered electors		3,873	

== See also ==
- Elections in Guernsey
