= 2016 Alderney plebiscite election =

The 2016 Alderney plebiscite election was to be held on 10 December 2016 to elect 2 members to be nominated to represent Alderney in the States of Guernsey. Louis Jean and Graham McKinley were the only candidates, and thus were nominated unopposed.
