= Laurie Morgan =

Guernsey politician (1930–2018)

First Chief Minister of Guernsey
- In office 2004–2007
- Preceded by: Office established
- Succeeded by: Mike Torode

Personal details
- Born: 18 January 1930 London, England
- Died: 17 December 2018 (aged 88)

Laurie Morgan (17 December 1930 – 18 January 2018) was a Deputy of the States of Guernsey, the parliament of the Bailiwick of Guernsey. He was Guernsey's first Chief Minister and was elected to the post in May 2004. His term of office was due to expire in 2008, when the next General Election was due. It was announced on 31 January 2007 that the Chief Minister and the Policy Council were to resign. The resignation followed a highly critical report, after the Fallagate scandal, regarding why the lowest tender to build a new clinical block at the Princess Elizabeth Hospital was withdrawn.

Morgan was born in London. He was first elected as a Deputy on 29 June 1988, and then went on to serve as a Conseiller until the post was abolished in 2000. He was re-elected as a Deputy for St. Peter Port in 2000. In 2004, the electoral districts were redefined and Morgan was re-elected to represent the electoral district of St. Peter Port South.

Morgan's wife, Wendy Morgan, served as a Deputy for St. Peter Port North and as Deputy Minister for Education until 2008.

On 5 March 2007, Deputy Mike Torode was elected to succeed Morgan as Chief Minister.

Preceded by	Deputy; Later Conseiller; 1988–2000	Succeeded by (Post abolished)
Preceded by —	Deputy for St. Peter Port; 2000–2004	Succeeded by (Electoral districts redefined)
Preceded by —	Deputy for St. Peter Port South; 2004-2008	Succeeded by
Preceded by —	Chief Minister; 2004–2007	Succeeded by Mike Torode
