= 2014 Alderney plebiscite election =

The 2014 Alderney plebiscite election was held on 6 December 2014 to elect 2 members to be nominated to represent Alderney in the States of Guernsey.

== Results ==
Candidate	Votes	%
Louis Jean	443	34.75
Graham McKinley	382	29.96
Matt Birmingham	225	17.65
Chris Rowley	225	17.65
Total	1,275	100.00
Valid votes	617	100.00
Invalid/blank votes	0	0.00
Total votes	617	100.00
Registered voters/turnout		48%
