= Heidi Soulsby =

Politician from the island of Guernsey

Heidi Soulsby MBE

Vice-President of the Policy & Resources Committee
- In office 13 December 2023 – 30 June 2025
- President: Lyndon Trott
- Preceded by: Mark Helyar
- Succeeded by: Gavin St Pier
- In office 16 October 2020 – 29 November 2022
- President: Peter Ferbrache
- Preceded by: Office established
- Succeeded by: Mark Helyar

Member of the States of Guernsey
- In office 2012 – 30 June 2025
- Constituency: South East (2012–2020); Island-wide (2020–2025)

Personal details
- Born: Heidi JR Soulsby
- Party: Independent
- Website: www.heidisoulsby.com

Heidi Soulsby is a politician from the island of Guernsey. She has been a deputy of the States of Guernsey since the 2012 Guernsey general election and was the first female Deputy Chief Minister of Guernsey.

She was made a Member of the Most Excellent Order of the British Empire (MBE) in the 2021 New Year Honours.

== Education ==
Soulsby graduated with a BSc (Hons) in Geography from King's College London.

== Political career ==
She was elected to the States of Guernsey in 2012, coming top of the poll in the South East district, and in 2016, when she again came top of the poll.

She was appointed head of the Health & Social Care Committee in 2016, a position she kept until the next election in 2020. She was a founder of the Guernsey Partnership of Independents, along with Gavin St Pier and Lyndon Trott, in August 2000.

Soulsby received the second highest number of votes in the Island-wide 2020 Guernsey general election with 12,779 votes, representing 51.89% of voters. The Guernsey Partnership of Independents renamed itself Future Guernsey in 2021.

She was appointed Vice-President of the Policy & Resources Committee in 2020, a position from which she resigned in October 2022. She was elected back on to the Policy & Resources Committee in December 2023 as Vice-President.

== Personal life ==
Soulsby lives in Saint Martin with her husband Phil.
