= Wendy Morgan (politician) =

Wendy Morgan is a former Deputy in the States of Guernsey, the parliament of the Bailiwick of Guernsey in the Channel Islands.

Wendy Morgan was elected in 2004 and represented the electoral district of St. Peter Port North, but failed to gain a seat in the 2008 elections. She was the Deputy Minister of Education .

Her husband, Laurie Morgan, was the Chief Minister of Guernsey from 2004 until 2007.
