= Policy Council of Guernsey =

Former political committee of the Bailiwick of Guernse

- Coat of arms of Guernsey

Council overview
- Formed: 1 May 2004
- Dissolved: 1 May 2016
- Superseding council: Policy and Resources Committee
- Jurisdiction: States of Guernsey
- Employees: 11
- Council executive: Chief Minister of Guernsey; Deputy Chief Minister
- Website: www.gov.gg/policycouncil

The Bailiwick of Guernsey operates a system of government by committees and consensus. The States of Deliberation is both parliament and executive, but it delegates some of its executive functions to policy-specific committees, which are known as States Departments, each of which is run by five political members, all of whom have equal voting power.

Despite having explicitly rejected a proposal to adopt an executive/ministerial system of government in 2002, the head of each department was known as minister. They were, in effect, presidents or chairmen of their committees.

The Policy Council consisted of the ministers/presidents of each of the ten departments plus the chief minister, who chaired Policy Council and spoke for the island externally in political matters. The Policy Council's main functions were policy co-ordination and responsibility for external relations. The chief minister and all department heads are elected by all members of the States of Deliberation. There also existed the post of Deputy Chief Minister, which was held by one of the department heads and was also elected by all members of the States of Deliberation.

On 1 May 2016 the Policy Council of Guernsey ceased to exist and a new committee, the Policy and Resources Committee was created.

== Policy Council (March 2014 – April 2016) ==
Portfolio	Minister
Chief Minister	Deputy Jonathan Le Tocq
Deputy Chief Minister; Minister, Social Security Department	Deputy Allister Langlois
Minister, Treasury & Resources Department	Deputy Gavin St Pier
Minister, Home Department	Deputy Peter Gillson
Minister, Health & Social Services Department	Deputy Mark Dorey (until 29 October 2014); Deputy Paul Luxon (from 29 October 2014)
Minister, Education Department	Deputy Robert Sillars
Minister, Commerce & Employment Department	Deputy Kevin Stewart
Minister, Culture & Leisure Department	Deputy Mike O'Hara
Minister, Public Services Department	Deputy Paul Luxon (until 29 October 2014); Deputy Scott Ogier (from 26 November 2014)
Minister, Environment Department	Deputy Roger Domaille (until 28 May 2014); Deputy Yvonne Burford (from 28 May 2014)
Minister, Housing Department	Deputy Dave Jones

== Policy Council (May 2012 – March 2014) ==
Portfolio	Minister
Chief Minister	Deputy Peter Harwood
Deputy Chief Minister; Minister, Home Department	Deputy Jonathan Le Tocq
Minister, Treasury & Resources Department	Deputy Gavin St Pier
Minister, Health & Social Services Department	Deputy Hunter Adam (until 14 December 2012); Deputy Mark Dorey (from 14 December 2012)
Minister, Education Department	Deputy Robert Sillars
Minister, Commerce & Employment Department	Deputy Kevin Stewart
Minister, Culture & Leisure Department	Deputy Mike O'Hara
Minister, Public Services Department	Deputy Paul Luxon
Minister, Environment Department	Deputy Roger Domaille
Minister, Social Security Department	Deputy Allister Langlois
Minister, Housing Department	Deputy Dave Jones

== Policy Council (May 2008 – May 2012) ==
Portfolio	Minister
Chief Minister	Deputy Lyndon Trott
Deputy Chief Minister; Minister, Public Services Department	Deputy Bernard Flouquet
Minister, Treasury & Resources Department	Deputy Charles Parkinson
Minister, Home Department	Deputy Geoff Mahy
Minister, Health & Social Services Department	Deputy Hunter Adam
Minister, Education Department	Deputy Carol Steere (until 16 January 2012); Deputy Robert Sillars (from 25 January 2012)
Minister, Commerce & Employment Department	Deputy Carla McNulty Bauer
Minister, Environment Department	Deputy Peter Sirett
Minister, Culture & Leisure Department	Deputy Mike O'Hara
Minister, Social Security Department	Deputy Mark Dorey
Minister, Housing Department	Deputy Dave Jones

== Policy Council (March 2007 – May 2008) ==
Portfolio	Minister
Chief Minister	Deputy Mike Torode
Deputy Chief Minister; Minister, Commerce & Employment Department	Deputy Stuart Falla
Minister, Treasury & Resources Department	Deputy Lyndon Trott
Minister, Home Department	Deputy Geoff Mahy
Minister, Health & Social Services Department	Deputy Peter Roffey
Minister, Education Department	Deputy Martin Ozanne
Minister, Culture & Leisure Department	Deputy Peter Sirett
Minister, Public Services Department	Deputy Bill Bell
Minister, Environment Department	Deputy David De Lisle
Minister, Social Security Department	Deputy Diane Lewis
Minister, Housing Department	Deputy Dave Jones

== Policy Council (May 2004 – March 2007) ==
Portfolio	Minister
Chief Minister	Deputy Laurie Morgan
Deputy Chief Minister; Minister, Environment Department	Deputy Bernard Flouquet
Minister, Treasury & Resources Department	Deputy Lyndon Trott
Minister, Home Department	Deputy Mike Torode
Minister, Health & Social Services Department	Deputy Peter Roffey
Minister, Education Department	Deputy Martin Ozanne
Minister, Commerce & Employment Department	Deputy Stuart Falla
Minister, Culture & Leisure Department	Deputy Peter Sirett
Minister, Public Services Department	Deputy Bill Bell
Minister, Social Security Department	Deputy Mary Lowe
Minister, Housing Department	Deputy Dave Jones

== See also ==
- Politics of Guernsey
- Council of Ministers of the Isle of Man
- Council of Ministers of Jersey
