= David Noakes =

British businessman and politician

- Born: March 1953 (age 73)
- Occupations: Computer consultant, businessman and politician
- Known for: Founding Immuno Biotech Ltd. to promote the controversial use of GcMAF
- Criminal charges: Money laundering, manufacturing, supplying and selling an unlicensed medicine
- Criminal penalty: 15 months imprisonment

David Noakes (born March 1953) is a British computer consultant, businessman and politician, who founded Immuno Biotech Ltd. to promote the unproven therapy GcMAF and came last in the 2006 UKIP leadership election. He pleaded guilty to "money laundering and manufacturing, supplying and selling an unlicensed medicine" and was sentenced in November 2018 to 15 months' imprisonment.

== Business ==
Noakes was a computer consultant for a decade. In 2004, he designed an alphabetical keyboard layout. He says he has worked for several Cornish companies, including Holman Brothers, Mount Wellington Tin Mine, and Phillips Frith, and in several countries, including in Brussels and for JPMorgan Chase Bank in New York.

=== Immuno Biotech ===
Noakes is CEO and owner of Immuno Biotech Ltd. (trade name First Immune), a Guernsey company that promotes the use of the protein GcMAF, a blood product, as a cure for cancer, autism, HIV, multiple sclerosis, and other diseases, claiming to treat 10,000 patients worldwide with income of £1 million per month. Noakes began promoting GcMAF in 2010, and the company had laboratories in Oxford in 2012. Noakes has been on the board of governors of the National Health Federation (a lobbying group promoting alternative medicine ) since April 2016 and was on the long list for Guernsey Press Ambassador of the Year 2013. Noakes advised cancer patients to not take chemotherapy and promoted the treatment to the Guernsey Chamber of Commerce despite criticism from Cancer Research UK; doctors on Guernsey all declined an invite to a meeting about GcMAF.

In July 2014, NatWest bank closed the company's accounts. In 2015, the UK Medicines and Healthcare products Regulatory Agency (MHRA) took over 10,000 vials of GcMAF during an inspection of the company's unlicensed Milton, Cambridgeshire site and shut down production, after it found that the plasma the GcMAF was derived from was not for human use, and that the production site did not meet good manufacturing practice standards. Noakes' former personal assistant, who worked for him in 2012, said that sometimes Noakes' own blood was used. The company had been supplying GcMAF to around 100 Guernsey residents free of charge until imports were prohibited by the Guernsey Border Agency in February 2015. Noakes' company began supplying an alternative called Goleic in place of GcMAF.

Noakes said in March 2015 that the UK authorities were harassing him and his family. He was interviewed by the BBC's The One Show in May 2015, but stormed out and threatened to smash the camera. A complaint to the BBC Trust about the interview was dismissed. Later that summer, the Swiss regulator Swissmedic closed the First Immune clinic in Bussigny, after five deaths of patients since it opened in October 2013. Noakes worked with American autism doctor Jeff Bradstreet until the latter committed suicide in June 2015, following a federal government raid of his office in connection to his work on GcMAF. Noakes also worked with scientist Marco Ruggiero until Noakes' Swiss clinic was closed.

In November 2015, Noakes was found guilty by an employment tribunal of sex discrimination against his former personal assistant at Immuno Biotech, Lucia Pagliarone, and was made to pay £10,500. Pagliarone claimed she was asked to give injections as part of her role, despite not having medical training.

Despite a police search of the Immuno Biotech office and a home in January 2016, Noakes had predicted in November 2016 that the MHRA investigation would come to nothing and he would "take down" the regulator; however, Guernsey police again raided the Immuno Biotech office in Lower Pollet in February 2017 and arrested a man and a woman, which Noakes said was a "smear campaign". French gendarmes also raided three locations in Normandy in February 2017. Noakes also ran a company, Macro Innovations, that illegally manufactured GcMAF for patient use at a laboratory in Cambridgeshire. Noakes was charged with money laundering, and conspiracy to manufacture a medicinal product without a licence, by the Crown Prosecution Service's Specialist Fraud Division in July 2017. He stood trial at Southwark Crown Court in November 2018, along with Brian Hall, Emma Ward and his former wife Loraine Noakes. Two of his Guernsey staff appeared in court in January 2018, in connection with the inquiry into Noakes' suspected criminal conduct.

Noakes pleaded guilty in UK to "money laundering and manufacturing, supplying and selling an unlicensed medicine" and was sentenced in November 2018 to 15 months' imprisonment. He failed to report to police in December 2019 while on bail and was arrested in May 2020 in Truro. In June 2020, a confiscation order of £1,349,400.48 was made at Southwark Crown Court against Noakes and his company.

In April 2021 Noakes pleaded guilty in France to manufacturing and selling fake medicinal products and cosmetics by Internet and sentenced to 4 years of imprisonment.

== Politics ==
Noakes joined UKIP in 2003, and was its parliamentary candidate in Truro and St Austell in 2005, gaining 5.3% of the vote. Noakes came last of the four candidates in the 2006 UKIP leadership election, with 851 votes. During the election campaign he called the EU a "police state" and advocated UKIP forming a shadow cabinet; Nigel Farage won with 3,329 votes. Noakes left UKIP in February 2007, writing in a letter that the leadership had betrayed the membership; Mark Croucher said Noakes was "a swivel-eyed loon whose insane conspiracy theories make the rest of us look as mad as a box of frogs".

Noakes was an independent town councillor for Penwerris ward on Falmouth Town Council and a member of the planning committee from May 2007 until January 2010, when he resigned due to "work commitments". He was fourth on the list for the United Kingdom First Party in the East Midlands region for the 2009 European Parliament elections; UK First received 1.7% of the vote. He stood in the December 2015 Guernsey by-election in Saint Peter Port North on a platform of increased democracy in Guernsey and introducing a constitution, gaining 109 votes (12.3%).

Noakes runs the website EUTruth.org, and since 2007 has published the free monthly newspaper Westminster News.

== Personal life ==
Noakes was born in London, went to Truro School and has lived in Port Pendennis, Falmouth, Cornwall, Guernsey, and Waldershare in Kent, where he was living before being jailed in 2018.

He was married in 1989 to Loraine, with whom he has a son and a daughter. The two separated in 2007, but did not divorce until 2018. Noakes sailed a yacht called Moonlight out of Falmouth between 2005 and 2010, and holds a pilot's licence.
