= Saint Peter Port South =

- Former electoral district for the States of Guernsey
- Parish: Saint Peter Port
- Electorate: 3,267 (2016 election)

Former electoral district
- Created: 2004
- Abolished: 2020
- Seats: 5

St. Peter Port South was an electoral district in Guernsey in the Channel Islands. It was created following the Machinery of Government changes which came into effect in 2004.

It consisted of the southern part of the parish of St. Peter Port, Herm, and Jethou. It is divided from St. Peter Port North by the following roads: Rohais, Les Gravées, The Grange and St. Julian's Avenue.

Polling stations

- The Constables’ Office, Lefebvre Street
- St. Stephen's Community Centre, St. Stephen's Lane

The district had six Deputies until 2016 when it was reduced to five, which represent the electorate in the States of Guernsey.

== Election results ==
=== Elections in the 2010s ===
2016 Guernsey general election
| Party | Candidate | Votes | % |
|---|---|---|---|
| Independent | Peter Ferbrache | 1,314 | 63.5% |
| Independent | Jan Kuttelwascher (incumbent) | 1,109 | 53.6% |
| Independent | Dawn Tindall | 853 | 41.2% |
| Independent | Barry Brehaut (incumbent) | 839 | 40.6% |
| Independent | Rhian Tooley | 839 | 40.6% |
| Independent | John Halker | 706 | 34.1% |
| Independent | Neil Forman | 617 | 29.8% |
| Independent | Mike Garrett | 600 | 29.0% |
| Independent | Bernard Flouquet | 598 | 28.9% |
| Independent | Ray Marshall | 451 | 21.8% |
| Total valid votes | | 7,926 | |
| Rejected ballots | | 9 | |
| Turnout | | 2,068 | 63% |
| Registered electors | | 3,267 | |

2012 Guernsey general election
| Party | Candidate | Votes | % |
|---|---|---|---|
| Independent | Peter Harwood | 1,191 | 61% |
| Independent | Jan Kuttelwascher (incumbent) | 1,072 | 54% |
| Independent | Barry Brehaut (incumbent) | 938 | 48% |
| Independent | Roger Domaille (incumbent) | 931 | 47% |
| Independent | Allister Langlois (incumbent) | 929 | 47% |
| Independent | Rob Jones | 695 | 35% |
| Independent | Jenny Tasker (incumbent) | 684 | 35% |
| Independent | Hugh Bygott-Webb | 683 | 35% |
| Independent | Neil Forman | 577 | 29% |
| Independent | Richard Lord | 553 | 28% |
| Total valid votes | | 8,253 | |
| Rejected ballots | | 8 | |
| Turnout | | 1,967 | 66.1% |
| Registered electors | | 2,976 | |

=== Elections in the 2000s ===
2008 Guernsey general election
| Party | Candidate | Votes | % |
|---|---|---|---|
| Independent | Barry Brehaut (incumbent) | 989 | 58.3% |
| Independent | Carla McNulty Bauer (incumbent) | 935 | 55.1% |
| Independent | Jenny Tasker (incumbent) | 909 | 53.6% |
| Independent | Roger Domaille | 884 | 52.1% |
| Independent | Allister Langlois | 865 | 51.0% |
| Independent | Jan Kuttelwascher | 770 | 45.4% |
| Independent | Richard Whitford | 651 | 38.4% |
| Independent | Keith Wilen | 607 | 35.8% |
| Independent | Matt Waterman | 310 | 18.3% |
| Independent | Tony Webber | 241 | 14.2% |
| Independent | Steve Brooks | 224 | 13.2% |
| Independent | Peter Burtenshaw | 220 | 13.0% |
| Independent | Sue Cotterill | 107 | 6.3% |
| Independent | Christopher O'Doherty | 18 | 1.1% |
| Total valid votes | | 7,730 | |
| Rejected ballots | | 3 | |
| Turnout | | 1,697 | 50.47% |
| Registered electors | | 3,370 | |

2005 St Peter Port South by-election
| Party | Candidate | Votes | % |
|---|---|---|---|
| Independent | Jenny Tasker | 306 | 31.8% |
| Independent | Jan Kuttlewascher | 204 | 21.2% |
| Independent | Barry Cash | N/A | N/A |
| Independent | Roy Bisson | 125 | 13% |
| Independent | Gloria Dudley-Owen | N/A | N/A |
| Independent | Peter Leigh | 58 | 6% |
| Independent | Michael Bourgaize | 19 | 2% |
| Independent | Angus Perfitt | 6 | 0.6% |
| Majority | | 102 | 10.6% |
| Turnout | | 963 | 32.5% |
| Registered electors | | 2,963 | |

2004 Guernsey general election
| Party | Candidate | Votes | % |
|---|---|---|---|
| Independent | Laurie Morgan (incumbent) | 1,074 | 60.8% |
| Independent | Brian Gabriel (incumbent) | 999 | 56.6% |
| Independent | John Gollop (incumbent) | 974 | 55.2% |
| Independent | Carla McNaulty Bauer | 854 | 48.4% |
| Independent | Barry Brehaut | 759 | 43.0% |
| Independent | Michael Burbridge (incumbent) | 758 | 42.9% |
| Independent | Roy Bisson (incumbent) | 744 | 42.2% |
| Independent | Gloria Dudley-Owen | 553 | 31.3% |
| Independent | Jan Kuttelwascher | 468 | 26.5% |
| Independent | Alan Thoume | 291 | 16.5% |
| Independent | Dave Allen | 287 | 16.3% |
| Total valid votes | | 7,761 | |
| Rejected ballots | | 4 | |
| Turnout | | 1,765 | 59.27% |
| Registered electors | | 2,969 | |

== See also ==
- Elections in Guernsey
