= Diane Lewis (Guernsey legislator) =

Guernsey politician

Diane Lewis was the Social Security Minister of Guernsey from March 2007 to April 2008 and sat on the Policy Council.

She was elected a Deputy to the States of Guernsey in April 2004 and was voted in as Social Security Minister in March 2007 following the Fallagate scandal. The vote was close and she beat the incumbent Mary Lowe, who attributed her election loss to the Fallgate scandal.

Deputy Lewis represented the St. Peter Port North electoral district until 2008.
