= Health in Guernsey =

The States of Guernsey established a Committee for Health & Social Care with effect from 1 May 2016. Its remit is to protect, promote and improve the health and wellbeing of individuals and the community.

Guernsey's Medical Officer of Health and Director of Public Health is responsible for all health matters in the Bailiwick of Guernsey.

== Healthcare ==
Guernsey residents registered for the payment of income-related Social Security contributions are covered by the ‘Specialist Health Insurance Scheme’ provided by the Medical Specialist Group consultants. Primary care is provided on a private basis by three General Practice partnerships whilst some secondary care and specialist services are free. The ambulance service is provided by Guernsey Ambulance and Rescue Service, a charitable company. This includes the non-emergency patient transport service.

=== Hospitals ===
The Princess Elizabeth Hospital, located on the outskirts of Town, provides the Islands with medical treatment and care. Opened in 1949, it has been expanded over time and currently has 12 wards and various departments designed to deal with the health needs of a population of 65,000. Undergoing an upgrade in 2023 to improve the critical care unit and post anesthetic care unit.

Alderney is served by the 22 bed Mignot Memorial Hospital.

=== Mental health ===
A purpose built Mental Health and Wellbeing Centre opened in 2015, adjacent to the Princess Elizabeth Hospital, enabling all mental health services to be located in one building.

A review in 2018 of Guernsey's mental health services reported that overall "Guernsey has good mental health services, which in many ways are as good as or better than those in most countries in the world".

The proportion of islanders saying that they were suffering with mental health issues increased from 14% in 2019 to 29% in 2021.

== Primary care providers ==
Apart from services provided at the hospital, primary care providers include:

=== Medical groups ===
- Medical Specialist Group - a private practice of specialist consultants with expertise in certain areas of medicine.
- Healthcare Group - Primary care surgeries and facilities
- IslandHealth - Primary care surgeries and facilities
- Queen’s Road Medical Practice - Primary care surgeries and facilities

There is also the Island Medical Centre in Alderney.

=== Dental services ===
A number of Dental surgeries operate in Guernsey and Alderney

=== Holistic Practitioners ===
Holistic practitioners provide acupuncture, osteopathy and reflexology, meditation and yoga

== Other health services ==
- Community Health and Social Care provide nursing and social support in the homes of adults in Guernsey
- Residential care for the elderly
- Hospice care
- Off Island health services for specialist needs include Southampton General Hospital, Great Ormond Street Hospital and Guy's and St Thomas' NHS Foundation Trust in the UK.

== General developments ==
The annual Medical Officers report in 2022 reported that from 2017 there had been free contraception for under 21's, Covid-19 resulted in the deaths of over 50 people in Guernsey in 2019-2022 and the law on abortion was to be amended to modernise it and remove anomalies.

The Health & Social Care committee made a 15-year contract with IMS MAXIMS to provide an Electronic Patient Record System, the My eHealth record, for acute hospital and mental health services in 2022. This will replace the existing TRAKCare 2012 system.

In May 2022 the committee proposed a plan to consider legalisation of cannabis.

From 1st January 2023, there is a reciprocal health agreement between Guernsey and the UK enabling residents to access medically necessary healthcare free of charge whilst they are visiting the other jurisdiction.
