= Guernsey Development Agency =

Government agency

Agency overview
- Formed: July 2023
- Jurisdiction: States of Guernsey
- Website: gda.gg

The Guernsey Development Agency is a government agency of the States of Guernsey that oversees the development of the eastern coast of Guernsey.

== History ==
The Guernsey Development Agency was established by the States of Guernsey in July 2023 to oversee the development of the eastern coast of Guernsey.

In April 2023, the agency's budget was cut from £500,000 to £100,000.

A survey conducted by the agency in October 2023 received 3,650 comments from 1,120 people and found that 70% of respondents felt the east coast needed to change.

As of August 2024, the agency is considering reclaiming land on the north side of St Sampson's Harbour.
