= 2016 Guernsey general election =

← 2012	27 April 2016	2020 →

38 of the 40 seats in the States of Guernsey
- Registered: 30,320
- Turnout: 71.91% (▲~0.5pp)
	First party
Party	Independents
Seats won	38
Popular vote	93,085
Percentage	100%
Chief Minister before election
Jonathan Le Tocq
President of the Policy and Resources Committee after election
Gavin St Pier

The 2016 Guernsey general election was held on 27 April 2016 to elect 38 members of the States of Guernsey, serving until 2020.

There was a by-election in October 2016 to fill a vacancy in the district of Vale.

== Electoral system ==
Following the 2012 general election, it was decided to reduce the number of seats from 45 to 38. This resulted in reductions to the number of seats in most electoral districts, although the districts themselves remained unchanged. The members of the States of Guernsey were elected via plurality-at-large voting in seven districts, with each district electing either five or six members.

A new electoral roll was drawn up, with 22,408 people registered to vote by 4 November 2015. The total passed 25,000 by 7 January 2016 and rose to 27,000 on 15 February, before reaching 30,320 when registration closed, higher than the 29,745 who registered for the 2012 elections.

== Campaign ==
Prospective candidates started to register by filing their nominations at the Bailiff's Chambers on 21 March and had until 31 March 2016 to file nomination forms. There are no political parties; all candidates stood as non-partisans. Candidates could apply for a grant of up to £600 for the production and distribution of manifestos. A total of 81 candidates stood for the 38 seats.

Hustings meetings took place at a number of locations on various dates in April.

== Results ==
20 deputies kept their seats, 4 former deputies were re-elected and 14 new deputies were elected. 10 deputies, including 4 ministers, lost their seats.

26 men and 12 women were elected as deputies. The previous assembly had just 5 women deputies.

21,803 voted (up from 20,459), representing 71.9% (up from 71.4%) of those who had registered to vote; 93,085 votes were cast (down from 95,612) due to fewer seats.

=== Castel ===
Castel district
Party	Candidate	Votes	%
Independent	Richard Graham	2,321	71.2%
Independent	Chris Green (incumbent)	1,868	57.3%
Independent	Barry Paint (incumbent)	1,720	52.7%
Independent	Mark Dorey (incumbent)	1,495	45.8%
Independent	Jonathan Le Tocq (incumbent)	1,342	41.1%
Independent	Darren Duquemin (incumbent)	1,025	31.4%
Independent	Ross Le Brun	834	25.6%
Independent	Sandra James	827	25.4%
Independent	Hunter Adam	719	22.0%
Independent	Leon Gallienne	619	19.0%
Independent	Neil Shepherd	601	18.4%
Independent	Russell Le Conte	241	7.4%
Total valid votes		13,612	
Rejected ballots		15	
Turnout		3,262	73%
Registered electors		4,469	

=== South East ===
South East district
Party	Candidate	Votes	%
Independent	Heidi Soulsby (incumbent)	1,925	57.2%
Independent	Lindsay De Sausmarez	1,808	53.8%
Independent	Peter Roffey	1,727	51.4%
Independent	Rob Prow	1,531	45.5%
Independent	Victoria Oliver	1,261	37.5%
Independent	Mike O'Hara (incumbent)	1,141	33.9%
Independent	Robert Sillars (incumbent)	953	28.3%
Independent	Robin Le Prevost	889	26.4%
Independent	Mike Hadley (incumbent)	799	23.8%
Independent	Greg Archer	755	22.5%
Independent	Stephen Prout	722	21.5%
Independent	John Titmuss	515	15.3%
Independent	Brian Breban	216	6.4%
Total valid votes		14,242	
Rejected ballots		20	
Turnout		3,363	73%
Registered electors		4,605	

=== St Peter Port North ===
St Peter Port North district
Party	Candidate	Votes	%
Independent	John Gollop (incumbent)	1,472	55.8%
Independent	Charles Parkinson (incumbent)	1,379	52.3%
Independent	Lester Queripel (incumbent)	1,199	45.4%
Independent	Michelle Le Clerc (incumbent)	1,147	43.5%
Independent	Marc Leadbeater	855	32.4%
Independent	Joe Mooney	799	30.3%
Independent	Caroline McManus	765	29.0%
Independent	Timothy Bush	716	27.1%
Independent	Rhoderick Matthews	704	26.7%
Independent	Lucia Pagliarone	703	26.6%
Independent	Ivan Rihoy	698	26.4%
Independent	Michael Henderson	656	24.9%
Independent	Rob Harnish	605	22.9%
Independent	Lilita Kruze	560	21.2%
Total valid votes		12,258	
Rejected ballots		4	
Turnout		2,639	65%
Registered electors		4,059	

=== St Peter Port South ===
St Peter Port South district
Party	Candidate	Votes	%
Independent	Peter Ferbrache	1,314	63.5%
Independent	Jan Kuttelwascher (incumbent)	1,109	53.6%
Independent	Dawn Tindall	853	41.2%
Independent	Barry Brehaut (incumbent)	839	40.6%
Independent	Rhian Tooley	839	40.6%
Independent	John Halker	706	34.1%
Independent	Neil Forman	617	29.8%
Independent	Mike Garrett	600	29.0%
Independent	Bernard Flouquet	598	28.9%
Independent	Ray Marshall	451	21.8%
Total valid votes		7,926	
Rejected ballots		9	
Turnout		2,068	63%
Registered electors		3,267	

=== St Sampson ===
St Sampson district
Party	Candidate	Votes	%
Independent	Lyndon Trott (incumbent)	2,014	57.4%
Independent	Paul Le Pelley (incumbent)	1,875	53.4%
Independent	Jennifer Merrett	1,664	47.4%
Independent	Gavin St Pier (incumbent)	1,543	44.0%
Independent	Jane Stephens	1,400	39.9%
Independent	Carl Meerveld	1,377	39.2%
Independent	Martyn Roussel	1,167	33.3%
Independent	Sam Maindonald	1,088	31.0%
Independent	Kevin Stewart (incumbent)	927	26.4%
Independent	Karen Solway	843	24.0%
Independent	Michael Beaumont	795	22.7%
Independent	Tony Webber	528	15.0%
Total valid votes		15,221	
Rejected ballots		12	
Turnout		3,509	78%
Registered electors		4,503	

=== Vale ===
Vale district
Party	Candidate	Votes	%
Independent	Matt Fallaize (incumbent)	2,758	73.1%
Independent	Dave Jones (incumbent)	2,511	66.5%
Independent	Mary Lowe (incumbent)	2,507	66.4%
Independent	Laurie Queripel (incumbent)	2,150	57.0%
Independent	Jeremy Smithies	1,684	44.6%
Independent	Sarah Hansmann Rouxel	1,653	43.8%
Independent	Garry Collins (incumbent)	1,362	36.1%
Independent	Neil Inder	1,332	35.3%
Independent	Simon De La Mare	685	18.2%
Independent	Trevor Hockey	615	16.3%
Independent	William Newman	86	2.3%
Total valid votes		17,343	
Rejected ballots		15	
Turnout		3,774	74%
Registered electors		5,125	

=== West ===
West district
Party	Candidate	Votes	%
Independent	Al Brouard (incumbent)	2,104	66.0%
Independent	Andrea Dudley-Owen	1,940	60.9%
Independent	Emilie Yerby	1,680	52.7%
Independent	David de Lisle (incumbent)	1,550	48.6%
Independent	Shane Langlois	1,214	38.1%
Independent	Rick Lowe	1,188	37.3%
Independent	Arrun Wilkie (incumbent)	1,157	36.3%
Independent	Yvonne Burford (incumbent)	1,033	32.4%
Independent	Martin Petit	617	19.4%
Total valid votes		12,483	
Rejected ballots		11	
Turnout		3,188	74%
Registered electors		4,292	

== Post-election controversy ==
Six male candidates who had failed to be elected filed a letter of complaint, alleging that the election was illegal as the States of Guernsey had provided funding to encourage more women to stand for election and to provide them with assistance by running a course. The complaint was rejected on the basis that the funds had been provided and spent before any candidates had put their names forward for the election, therefore they did not assist any 'candidates'. They subsequently asked the UK government to investigate the election.
