= Peter Ferbrache =

Former Guernsey politician (born 1951)

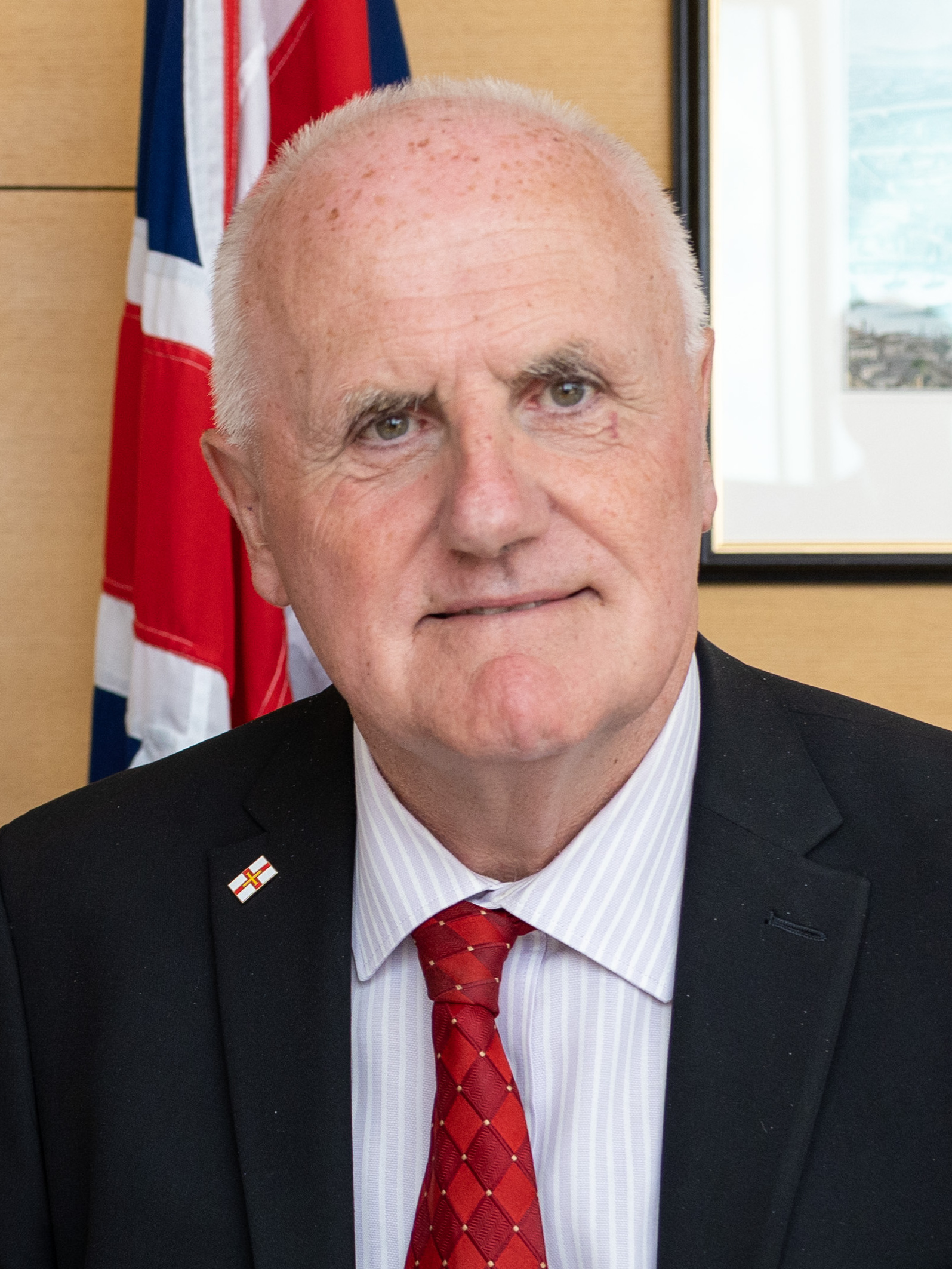
- Ferbrache in 2022

President of the Policy and Resources Committee of Guernsey
- In office 16 October 2020 – 13 December 2023
- Monarchs: Elizabeth II; Charles III
- Vice President: Heidi Soulsby
- Preceded by: Gavin St Pier
- Succeeded by: Lyndon Trott

Minister of Economic Development Committee
- In office 11 May 2016 – November 2017

Member of the States of Guernsey
- In office May 2016 – June 2025
- In office 1994 – April 2000

Personal details
- Born: Peter Terence Richard Ferbrache; January 1951 (age 75) Guernsey
- Party: Independent
- Profession: Barrister, Advocate
- Website: www.peterferbrache.gg

Peter Terence Richard Ferbrache (born 1951) is a former Deputy in the States of Guernsey, the parliament of Guernsey in the Channel Islands, and former president of the Policy and Resources Committee.

== Early life and education ==
Ferbrache was born in Guernsey where he was educated at Elizabeth College before going to a law school in England. He qualified as a barrister in England in 1972.

== Career ==
He returned to Guernsey in 1980 and was called to the bar as an advocate in March 1981, later becoming senior partner of Mourant Ozannes. Alongside his political career he remains a consultant and notary public at Ferbrache & Farrell LLP.

== Political career ==
He was first elected in 1994 as a deputy for the Castel district before being elected in 1997 as an island wide conseiller, becoming president of the Board of Industry between 1997 and 2000. He did not stand for re-election in 2000.

Returning to politics, Ferbrache was elected at the general election on 27 April 2016 as a deputy for the Saint Peter Port South district, then standing for, but not getting after two drawn votes, the position of Policy & Resources Committee president.

Voted as President of the States of Guernsey's Economic Development Committee he held the position until resigning in November 2017 as a result of accusations of a conflict of interest with a law firm that was provided with a government contract. In February 2018 he was cleared of any wrongdoing.

In November 2018 he became a founding member and chairman of The 2020 Association.

Standing again, he was re-elected at the 2020 general election and then in a secret ballot of deputies on 16 October 2020 he beat the incumbent to become president of the Policy and Resources Committee.

On 13 December 2023 Ferbrache lost a vote of no confidence resulting in his removal as president of the Policy and Resources Committee.

He was unsuccessful in securing re-election at the 2025 general election held on 18 June 2025, ending his second period of service in the States of Guernsey.

== Personal life ==
He is married with four children.

Political offices
Preceded by Gavin St Pier	President of the Policy and Resources Committee; 2020–2023	Succeeded by Lyndon Trott
