= Marie Randall =

Guernsey politician

Member of the States of Guernsey
- In office 1924–1955

Personal details
- Born: 1881
- Died: 1965 (aged 83–84)

Marie Louise Mansell Randall MBE (1881–1965) was a politician in Guernsey. In 1924 she was elected to the States of Deliberation, the parliament and government of Guernsey, becoming its first female member.

== Biography ==
Randall was born in 1881, the second daughter of Robert Randall, the owner of Randalls Brewery. During World War I she volunteered as a nurse, initially serving with the Voluntary Aid Detachment in Rouen, before moving to the First London General Hospital in Camberwell.

Randall contested the 1924 elections and was elected to the States of Guernsey , becoming its first female member. She remained a deputy until 1955. While a member of the States, she served on the Education Council. She was awarded an MBE in the 1954 Birthday Honours.

She died in 1965.

== Recognition ==
Randall features on the 'Notable Women of Guernsey' walking trail and a blue plaque for her was unveiled in 2024.
