= Lindsay de Sausmarez =

Guernsey politician

President of the Policy and Resources Committee of Guernsey
- Incumbent
- Assumed office 1 July 2025
- Preceded by: Lyndon Trott

Member of the States of Guernsey
- Incumbent
- Assumed office May 2016

Personal details
- Born: H. Lindsay Henderson; 1977 or 1978
- Party: Independent
- Education: Durham University; University of New South Wales

Lindsay de Sausmarez (English pronunciation: /dəˈsʌməreɪ/ də SUM-ə-ray) (born 1977 or 1978) is a Guernsey politician serving as the President of the Policy and Resources Committee (the head of government) since 1 July 2025.

Her maiden name was H. Lindsay Henderson.

== Early life and education ==
De Sausmarez is the daughter of Tim Henderson, a retired executive of HSBC Bank. Born in 1977, by her own account she was born in Asia. Her father is from Guernsey while her mother is from Scotland, and as she grew up she spent time in many countries, while living in Guernsey during the summer. She lived for five years in Sri Lanka, attending an international school there, where her father was chief executive of HSBC Sri Lanka, then returned to Europe to attend Ardvreck School at Crieff. Her parents moved to Guernsey full-time when she was 16, when her father became chief executive of the Leopold Joseph (Channel Islands) Bank, and at this time she was still studying in Scotland. She attended Durham University from 1996 to 1999, graduating with a bachelor's degree in English literature. She later moved to Australia, where in 2002 she was writing film reviews in Sydney, noting that at Durham she had developed a particular interest in French and Italian films. She attended the University of New South Wales from 2003 to 2004, graduating with a master's degree in theatre.

De Sausmarez lived in Australia for five years and worked for several film companies, as well as on a farm. However, she said they were low-paying jobs and that "I would often hold down two or three jobs at a time to make ends meet". She struggled to pay high rent and said that "At times I was living on nothing but apples and reduced-for-quick-sale bread"; at one point she became homeless when her landlord terminated her tenancy, and she then lived with friends. She later moved back to Guernsey and became a freelance writer and a producer for Specsavers. In August 2007 her short film Dolly, about a shop window mannequin, was shown at the Cannes Film Festival.

== Political career ==
In the 2016 general election, de Sausmarez ran as an independent candidate and won a seat to the States of Guernsey, receiving 1,808 votes (53.8%). She ran for re-election in 2020, retaining her seat with 8,645 votes (35.1%). In the States of Guernsey, she served as President of the Committee for the Environment & Infrastructure and Vice President of the Committee for Employment & Social Security. She was re-elected again in the 2025 general election with 10,721 votes (54%), more than 1,300 votes over the second-placed candidate.

On 1 July 2025, she was elected by the States to be President of the Policy and Resources Committee of Guernsey – a position also known as the chief minister, and effectively Guernsey's head of government – becoming the first woman to hold the position. She had decided to stand for election less than a week beforehand.

== Personal life ==
Lindsay Henderson and Rollo de Sausmarez both played touch rugby for Guernsey. In 2007, they were engaged and living in Guernsey. They later married, and now have four children together. They live in Saint Martin.
