= Gavin St Pier =

Guernsey politician (born 1967)

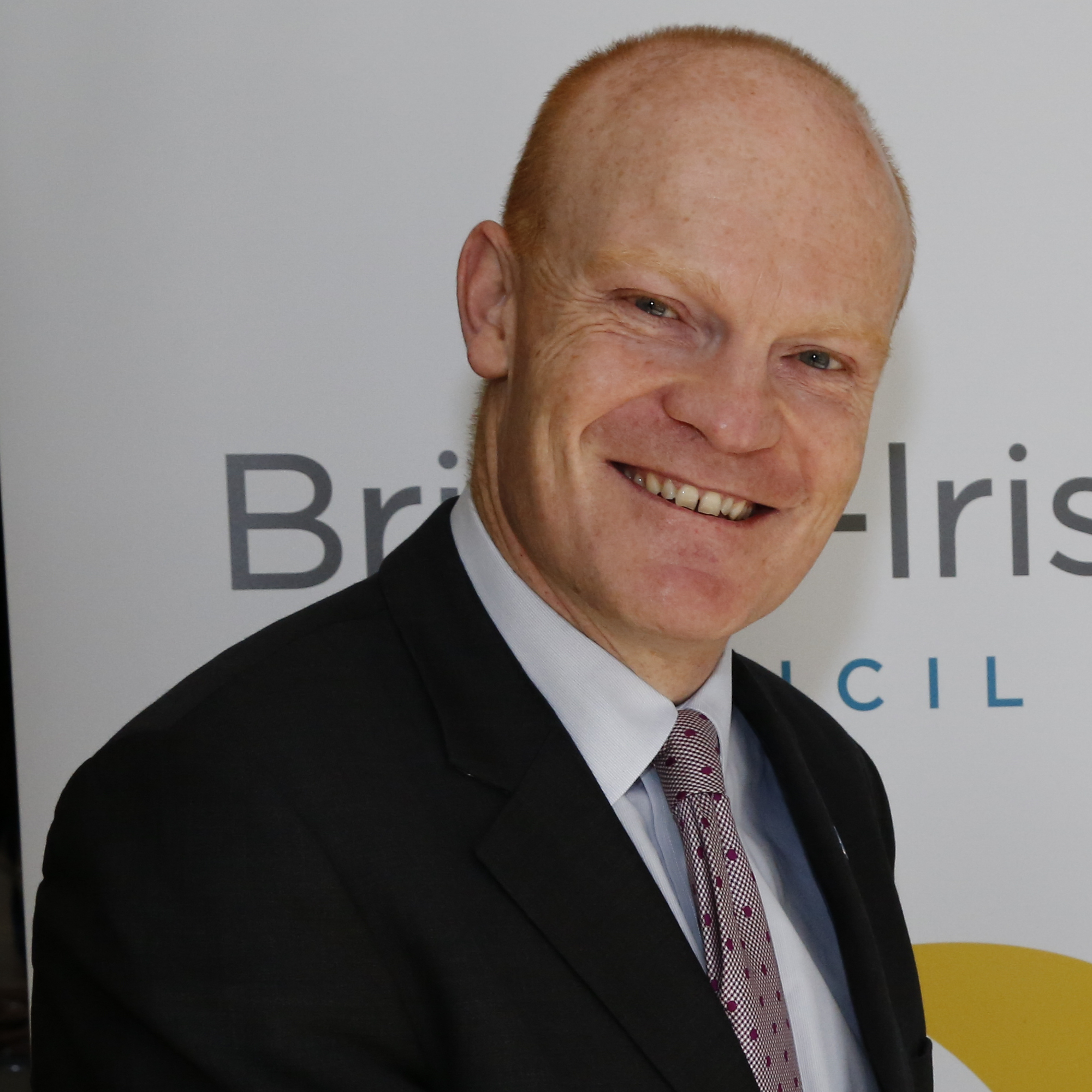

Member of the States of Guernsey
- Incumbent
- Assumed office 1 May 2012

Minister of Treasury and Resources
- In office 8 May 2012 – May 2016

President of the Policy and Resources Committee of Guernsey
- In office 4 May 2016 – 16 October 2020
- Preceded by: Jonathan Le Tocq (as Chief Minister of Guernsey)
- Succeeded by: Peter Ferbrache

Leader of Forward Guernsey
- Incumbent
- Assumed office 11 April 2025

Political Adviser for Future Guernsey
- In office 28 November 2024 – April 2025

Personal details
- Born: Gavin Anthony St Pier; January 1967 (age 59)
- Other political affiliations: Independent (2012–2020); Guernsey Partnership of Independents (2020–2021); Future Guernsey (2021, 2024–2025)
- Spouse: Married
- Children: 3
- Education: University of Southampton
- Profession: Accountant, tax advisor
- Website: gavinstpier.gg

Gavin Anthony St Pier (born January 1967) is an elected deputy in the States of Guernsey and former president of the Policy and Resources Committee. He has been a prominent figure in Guernsey politics since 2012 and is currently the leader of the Forward Guernsey political party.

== Early life and education ==
St Pier was born in January 1967. He attended the University of Southampton.

== Professional career ==
St Pier qualified as a Chartered Accountant, Chartered Tax Adviser, and barrister. He worked in the financial services sector before entering politics.

== Political career ==
=== Early political career ===
St Pier was first elected to the States of Guernsey at the general election on 18 April 2012 as a deputy for St Sampson's District.

He served as minister of treasury and resources from May 2012 to May 2016, overseeing the island's public finances during a challenging economic period.

=== President of Policy and Resources Committee ===
St Pier was re-elected at the 2016 general election, though with a reduced vote. After the third secret ballot he was elected in May 2016 as president of the Policy and Resources Committee, effectively becoming the island's Chief Minister.

During his tenure as president from 2016 to 2020, St Pier led the States' response to various challenges, including fiscal pressures and later the COVID-19 pandemic. He was known for his direct communication style, particularly during the pandemic when he delivered regular public statements about lockdown measures and government responses.

St Pier lost his position as president in October 2020 following the 2020 general election, when Peter Ferbrache was elected to succeed him.

=== Political party involvement ===
In August 2020, St Pier formed the Guernsey Partnership of Independents party with Heidi Soulsby and Lyndon Trott. The party won 10 seats in the 2020 election, making it the largest group in the States Assembly, though it later dissolved.

=== Future Guernsey and Forward Guernsey ===
In December 2021, St Pier launched Future Guernsey as a successor political movement, describing it as "fiscally and environmentally responsible and socially liberal". This first iteration was later de-registered as a political party.

In November 2024, St Pier relaunched Future Guernsey as a policy-focused organisation, serving as Political Adviser alongside former ITN chief executive John Hardie as chairman and communications consultant Lindsey Freeman as CEO. Future Guernsey developed a comprehensive manifesto focusing on six core policy areas but was deliberately structured as an unregistered movement, meaning it could not legally endorse candidates under Guernsey electoral law.

=== Electoral law workaround ===
To circumvent the legal limitations faced by Future Guernsey, St Pier launched Forward Guernsey on 11 April 2025 as a completely separate registered political party for the upcoming 2025 Guernsey general election. Forward Guernsey adopted the Future Guernsey manifesto "in its entirety", effectively transferring the policy development work to an electoral vehicle that could legally contest elections.

St Pier explained the separation was necessary because "Future Guernsey is not permitted by its constitution or electoral law to endorse and support candidates", requiring the creation of Forward Guernsey as a distinct legal entity. Upon launching Forward Guernsey, St Pier resigned his role as Political Adviser to Future Guernsey to become the new party's leader, maintaining the organizations as legally separate entities.

=== 2025 election campaign ===
Forward Guernsey launched with four initial candidates: St Pier, Tom Rylatt, Rhona Humphreys and Ryan Courtney. The party's structure represents what St Pier described as "nothing like this or as comprehensive as this has ever been tried before in Guernsey", designed to provide policy coherence while working within electoral law constraints.

St Pier has been critical of what he describes as the "endemic inertia and indecision" of independent-dominated assemblies, advocating for policy-based party politics as a solution to governmental dysfunction.

== Personal life ==
St Pier is married with three children and has lived in Saint Sampson, Guernsey, since 1997. He continues to work as a trust professional alongside his political career.

Political offices
Preceded by Jonathan Le Tocq as Chief Minister of Guernsey	President of the Policy and Resources Committee; 2016–2020	Succeeded by Peter Ferbrache
