= Lyndon Trott =

Guernsey politician (born 1964)

Lyndon Trott OBE
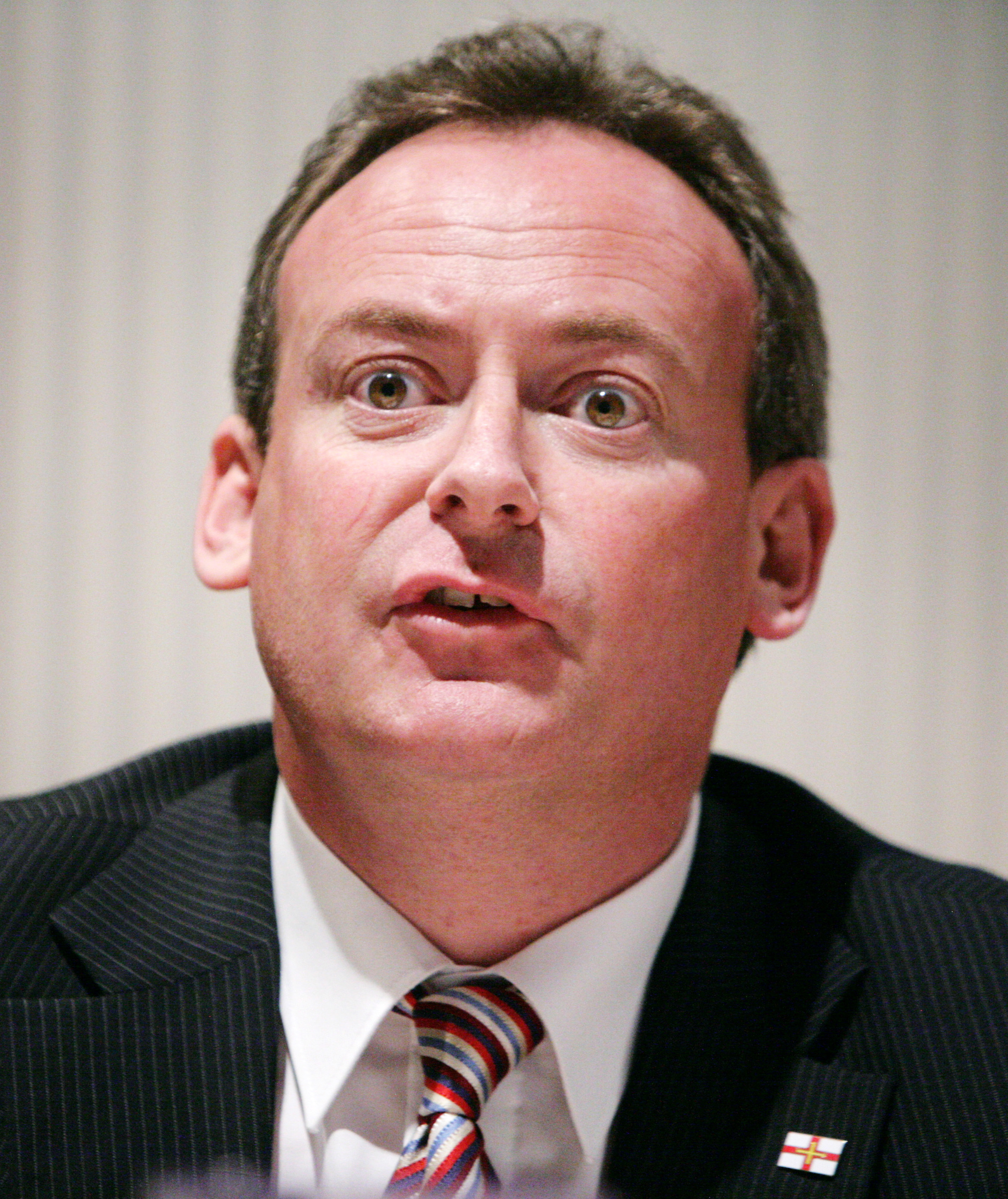

President of the Policy and Resources Committee
- In office 13 December 2023 – 1 July 2025
- Monarch: Charles III
- Governor: Richard Cripwell
- Preceded by: Peter Ferbrache
- Succeeded by: Lindsay de Sausmarez

Chief Minister of Guernsey
- In office 1 May 2008 – 1 May 2012
- Monarch: Elizabeth II
- Governor: Fabian Malbon; Peter Walker
- Preceded by: Mike Torode
- Succeeded by: Peter Harwood

Personal details
- Born: 17 July 1964 (age 62) Saint Sampson, Guernsey

Lyndon Sean Trott (born 17 July 1964, St. Sampson, Guernsey) is an elected Deputy in the States of Guernsey who served as the Chief Minister of Guernsey from 2008 to 2012 and has served as President of the Policy and Resources Committee of Guernsey from 2023 to 2025.

== Political appointments ==
Deputy Trott has been a deputy in the States of Guernsey, the parliament of Guernsey in the Channel Islands, since 2000. He was re-elected in 2004 and again in 2008.

From 2004 until 2008 he was the Treasury and Resources Minister before being elected Chief Minister of Guernsey on 1 May 2008. His term of office expired on 30 April 2012. He succeeded Mike Torode as Guernsey's third Chief Minister following the creation of the post in 2004.

He was re-elected as a Deputy for the electoral district of St. Sampson in the General Election of 2012 and again in 2016, being elected as Vice President of the Policy and Resources Committee, the Senior Committee of the States of Guernsey following the 2016 changes.

In August 2020, Trott formed the Guernsey Partnership of Independents party with Heidi Soulsby and Gavin St Pier.

He was appointed President of the Policy and Resources Committee of Guernsey, assuming office on 13 December 2023.

He is married & has a daughter named Jodie.

Political offices
Preceded by Peter Ferbrache	President of the Policy and Resources Committee; 2023–2025	Succeeded by Lindsay de Sausmarez

Political offices
Preceded by Mike Torode	Chief Minister of Guernsey; 2008–2012	Succeeded by Peter Harwood
