= Policy & Resources Committee =

Committee in Guernsey

Policy and Resources Committee of Guernsey

Committee overview
- Formed: 1 May 2016; 10 years ago
- Preceding committee: Policy Council
- Jurisdiction: States of Guernsey
- Headquarters: Sir Charles Frossard House, La Charroterie, St. Peter Port, GY1 1FH
- Employees: 5
- Committee executives: Lindsay de Sausmarez, President; Yvonne Buford, Vice-President
- Website: Policy and Resources Committee

The Policy & Resources Committee is the Senior Committee of the system of government in the Bailiwick of Guernsey. It was created on 1 May 2016 to replace the Policy Council of Guernsey.

Guernsey generally operates a system of government by committees and consensus. There were no registered political parties until 2020. The States of Deliberation is both parliament and executive, but it delegates most of its executive functions to policy-specific committees, which are known as the six principal committees, each of which is run by five political members, all of whom have equal voting power.

== Objectives ==
To provide advice for the States of Guernsey, to develop policies and programmes and to implement such policies when approved relating to:

- Leadership and co-ordination of the work of the States
- Fiscal policy, economic affairs and the financial and other resources of the States
- External relations and international and constitutional affairs
- Other matters which have been delegated to the Committee

== Committee ==
The committee is elected by States Deputies until the next general election. The next election will be in June 2025.

The current committee comprises a president and four members.

The president of the committee is the de facto head of government of Guernsey and may be given the title Chief Minister. The vice president may also use the title Deputy Chief Minister.

One person in the committee is nominated as Lead Person for External Affairs; the title Minister for External Affairs is sometimes used.

Portfolio	Deputy	Appointed	Title	Notes
President	Lindsay de Sausmarez	1 July 2025	Chief Minister	
Vice President	Yvonne Buford	26 May 2026	Deputy Chief Minister	
Head of the Treasury	Charles Parkinson	2 July 2025		
Head of External Affairs	Steve Falla	2 July 2025		
Member	Andrew Niles	20 May 2026		

=== Election ===
The 40 States Deputies hold an election to determine the President, with successive rounds of voting continuing until an outright winner is elected. All candidates having to be proposed and seconded.

Shortly afterwards, the newly elected president may name his preferred committee members, however it is the votes of the States Deputies that elect the remaining four committee members. All candidates having to be proposed and seconded.

A lost vote to a motion of "no confidence" in the committee results in the immediate resignation of the President and Members of the Policy & Resources Committee, the States of Deliberation having no confidence in the said Committee and will result in an immediate election of first a new President and then the new committee members.

=== Avoidance of conflict of interest ===
No person on the Committee may be a president or member of the six principal committees, or of the Scrutiny Management Committee, the Development & Planning Authority, or the Transport Licensing Authority.

=== Six principal committees ===
- Committee for Economic Development
- Committee for Health & Social Care
- Committee for Education, Sport & Culture
- Committee for Employment & Social Security
- Committee for the Environment & Infrastructure
- Committee for Home Affairs

== Civil servants ==
The Policy and Resources Committee is assisted by key civil servants:

- Chief Executive
- Chief Strategy and Policy Officer
- Chief Operating Officer
- States Treasurer
- Chief Information Officer

== See also ==
- Politics of Guernsey
- List of current heads of government in the United Kingdom and dependencies
- Council of Ministers of the Isle of Man
- Council of Ministers of Jersey
