= Martin Storey (politician) =

Martin Storey (died July 22, 2015) was a Channel Islander politician who served as a deputy in the States of Guernsey from 2008 until his death on July 22, 2015, representing the St Peter Port North constituency. He also served as Deputy Minister of the Health and Social Services Department, a member of the Housing and Commerce and Employment Departments and on the Public Accounts Committee.
