= Elections in Guernsey =

Guernsey elects a legislature at the national level. The islands of Alderney and Sark also elect their own parliaments.

== Guernsey ==
The Guernsey legislature, the States of Deliberation, consists of 38 elected members (known as Deputies) and two representatives of Alderney, with the Bailiff (or his Deputy) acting as Presiding Officer with neither a casting nor original vote. In addition the Law Officers of the Crown are members of the States of Deliberation but they may not vote and by convention only address the assembly when answering questions or offering legal advice on matters under debate. Guernsey is a state in which political parties have not historically played an important role.

Islanders also vote for their Parish officials.

Voters are eligible to be inscribed on the electoral roll of Guernsey if they are:

- 15 or over (being able to vote from the age 16);
- have been resident in Guernsey for 5 years (with or without breaks) or 2 years continuously;
- are ordinarily resident in Guernsey;
- are not subject to a legal disability.

=== Guernsey States of Deliberation elections ===
Held every 4 years. The Guernsey States of Deliberation consists of 38 elected members (known as Deputies) and two representatives of Alderney, with the Bailiff (or his Deputy) acting as Presiding Officer with neither a casting nor original vote. Prior to 2016, the number of elected members was 45+2.

Composition of States of Deliberation 2020

In 2020 voting moved to an island-wide system; prior to that there were seven election districts from 2004.

Deputies are elected from a single island-wide constituency by plurality-at-large voting, with voters being able to cast up to 38 votes.

=== Political parties ===
A free association of persons wishing to support or endorse a candidate for election must register their party with the Guernsey Greffier.

Guernsey political parties include:

- Alliance Party Guernsey
- The Guernsey Party
- Forward Guernsey

=== Administrative divisions – Parishes ===
Each parish in Guernsey is administered by a Douzaine. Douzeniers are elected for a six-year mandate, two Douzeniers being elected by parishioners at a Parish Meeting in November each year. The senior Douzenier is known as the Doyen.

Two elected Constables carry out the decisions of the Douzaine, serving for between one and three years. The longest serving Constable is known as the Senior Constable and his or her colleague as the Junior Constable.

Each of Douzaine nominates between one and nine of their number (depending upon the population in the parish) (34 in total) to represent their parish in the States of Election for a new Jurat.

== Alderney ==
Alderney elects its own parliament, as well as two representatives to the bailiwick assembly. States Members hold office for four years and in alternate years there is an "Ordinary Election" at which five of the sitting members may offer themselves for re-election. The President of the States of Alderney is elected for a four-year term of office.

== Sark ==
Sark elects its own parliament.

Voters are eligible to be inscribed on the electoral roll of Sark if they are:

- 15 or over (being able to vote from the age 16);
- have been ordinarily resident in Sark for 24 months since the age of 13;
- are ordinarily resident in Sark;
- are not subject to a legal disability.

== See also ==
- Electoral calendar
- Electoral system
- Politics of Guernsey
- 2012 Guernsey general election
- 2016 Guernsey general election
- 2020 Guernsey general election
