= David Jones (Guernsey politician) =

Dave Jones (1949 – 5 July 2016) was a member of the States of Guernsey and president of the States Trading Supervisory Board.

Born in 1949, he was found in a cellar in Golders Green, London with his sister Kathleen. They were both suffering from malnutrition and influenza. David was taken into the care of Barnardo's where he remained until the age of 15 when he started work. He left England as a young man and settled in Guernsey in 1970, worked in the heavy plant industry, and was one of the island's government ministers. Married in 1978, he has two grown children and three grandchildren.

He supported Guernsey's self-governance and independence. He was a member of the External Relations Group, supported island-wide voting, parish schools, tougher sentencing for criminal damage, tidal power, and the continuation of the social housebuilding programme. Jones was a member of UKIP. He wrote several articles on the failings of the European Union, and on the breakdown of the family unit, feral youngsters and the lack of parental control or accountability for the actions of their children. He was in his fifth term of office as a states deputy.

It was announced in a statement released by policy and resources on 5 July 2016 that Jones had died from cancer.
