= Chief Minister of Guernsey =

Former head of the government of Guernsey

- Flag of Guernsey
- Member of: Policy Council; British–Irish Council
- Appointer: States of Guernsey
- Term length: Four years
- Precursor: Bailiff of Guernsey
- Formation: 1 May 2004
- First holder: Laurie Morgan
- Final holder: Jonathan Le Tocq
- Abolished: 4 May 2016
- Deputy: Deputy Chief Minister

The Chief Minister of Guernsey chaired the Policy Council, which consists of the heads of each of the ten departments of the States of Guernsey. Guernsey operates a system of consensus, committees-based government. The Policy Council is explicitly not a cabinet and has relatively little executive authority compared to a cabinet; instead, its main function is policy co-ordination. The Chief Minister also spoke for the island externally in political matters.

This post was created following the Machinery of Government review which came into effect on 1 May 2004. The rules for selection of the Chief Minister were amended in 2012 immediately prior to the election of a new Chief Minister; prior to this change candidates for the post needed to have served four or more of the last eight years as a deputy to qualify for the role. Deputy Harwood would have been unable to stand for the role of Chief Minister under the previous rules.

The position and title Chief Minister was abolished from 1 May 2016, along with the ministerial government system. It has been replaced by a senior committee Policy and Resources Committee.

== List of heads of government of Guernsey ==
#	Name	Term of office	
Chief Ministers
1	Laurie Morgan	1 May 2004	5 March 2007
2	Mike Torode	5 March 2007	1 May 2008
3	Lyndon Trott	1 May 2008	1 May 2012
4	Peter Harwood	1 May 2012	12 March 2014
5	Jonathan Le Tocq	12 March 2014	4 May 2016

== Election of 2004 ==
The first post holder was Deputy Laurie Morgan who was elected by the States in their first meeting of May 2004 and beat Deputy Bernard Flouquet, who was elected Deputy Chief Minister, and Deputy Mike Torode.

It was announced 31 January 2007, 'that the Chief' Minister and the Policy Council were to resign following an independent audit into the tender process for a hospital block.

== Election of 2007 ==
The election of a new Chief Minister to replace Laurie Morgan took place at a meeting of the States on 5 March 2007. Laurie Morgan announced that he would not be seeking re-election. Four candidates contested the position: Deputies Jonathan Le Tocq, Bernard Flouquet, Mike Torode and Peter Roffey.

In the final round of voting, Deputy Mike Torode beat Deputy Peter Roffey by 24 votes to 22.

Deputy Torode did not seek reelection in 2008, and Deputy Lyndon Trott was elected by the States to the post of Chief Minister, defeating the following other candidates: Bernard Flouquet, Al Brouard, Hunter Adam, Carla McNulty Bauer and David de Lisle.

== Election of 2012 ==
The election of a new Chief Minister to replace Lyndon Trott took place at a meeting of the States on 1 May 2012. Lyndon Trott, Jonathan Le Tocq and Peter Harwood all expressed interest in the position, but only Deputies Harwood and Le Tocq were nominated.

In the final round of voting, Deputy Peter Harwood beat Deputy Jonathan Le Tocq by 27 votes to 20.

== Election of 2014 ==
The resignation of Deputy Peter Harwood as Chief Minister on 25 February caused an election that was held on 12 March 2014. Nominations opened at 9am on 27 February and closed at 5pm on 6 March. Jonathan Le Tocq was elected.

The position of Chief Minister was abolished from 1 May 2016.

== Deputies ==
Heidi Soulsby became the first female Deputy Chief Minister of Guernsey in October 2020.
