= Mary Lowe (Guernsey politician) =

Guernsey politician

Mary May Lowe is a politician in the Bailiwick of Guernsey. She served in the island's legislature for 26 years, becoming Guernsey's longest-serving politician, before leaving office after the 2020 general election.

== Political career ==
Lowe was first elected as a representative of the parish of Vale in the States of Guernsey, the bailiwick's legislature, in 1994. She was consistently reelected over the next two decades. Beginning in 2004 she served as social security minister on the States of Guernsey's Policy Council. She lost the ministerial position in 2007 to Diane Lewis, with Lowe attributing her election loss to the Fallgate scandal.

After a long career in the legislature, Lowe became the first person to hold the title of "Mother of the House." In this role, she served as acting presiding officer when the parliament's bailiff or deputy bailiff were unavailable. She also led the States of Guernsey's Committee for Home Affairs, which is responsible for managing the bailiwick's emergency services, judicial system, and prison, from 2013 to 2020.

In 2017, Lowe faced complaints that she had made discriminatory comments about a fellow politician, Marc Leadbeater, suggesting that he would be unfit to serve in the legislature because he has a close relative with disabilities. She denied any wrongdoing and dismissed the complaints as "totally unwarranted." Then, in 2019, Lowe faced pressure to step down from her position in the legislature amid allegations that she bullied staff. After a government report accused Lowe of "harassing or bullying" staff on the Committee for Home Affairs, Lowe argued there was a "woeful lack of evidence" and declined to leave office, although two other committee members stepped down in anticipation of the report's release.

The 2020 Guernsey general election, which was delayed by the COVID-19 pandemic, marked a major restructure of Guernsey's electoral system, with political parties introduced for the first time and candidates running in an all-island vote rather than separate parishes. Lowe ran as an independent. She lost her spot in the legislature, with 20.4% support in the plurality-at-large vote. On leaving office, Lowe was the island's longest-serving politician.
