= Jonathan Le Tocq =

Guernsey politician

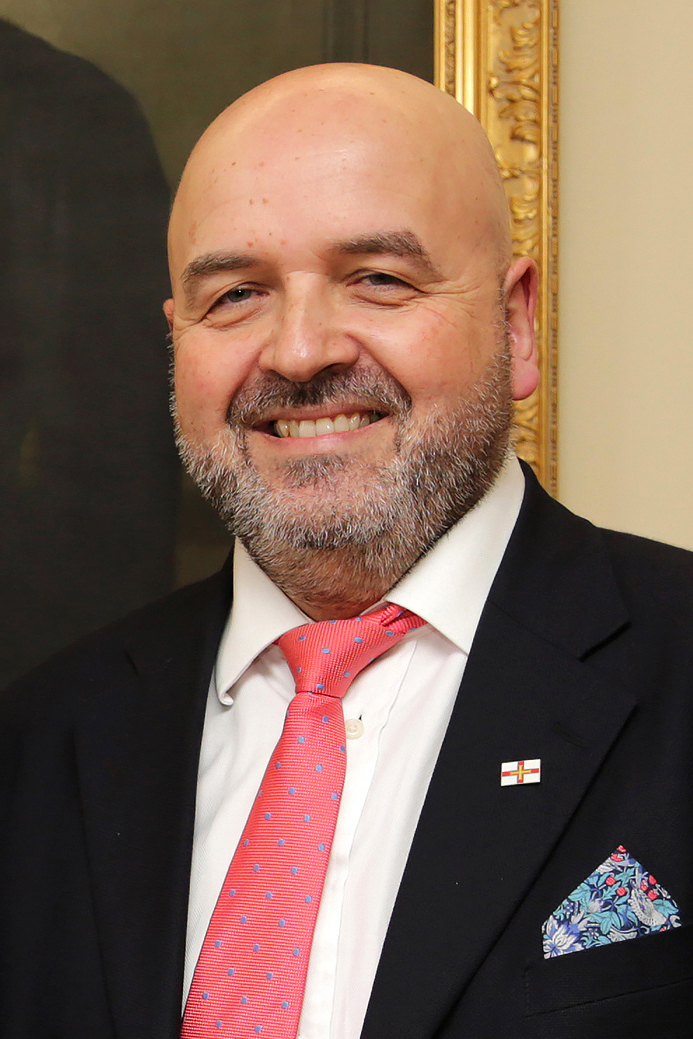
- Jonathan Le Tocq in 2019

Chief Minister of Guernsey
- In office 12 March 2014 – 4 May 2016
- Preceded by: Peter Harwood
- Succeeded by: Gavin St Pier as President of the Policy and Resources Committee

Personal details
- Born: 4 March 1964 (age 62) Guernsey

Jonathan Paul Le Tocq (born 4 March 1964) is a former politician in Guernsey, Channel Islands, who served as the Chief Minister of Guernsey from 2014 to 2016. He is currently serving a sentence of 9 years imprisonment.

== Early life and career ==
He was adopted in Guernsey.

After working in London, he was ordained into the Christian ministry, before returning to Guernsey, where he became Senior Pastor of Church on the Rock in 1989.

== Political career ==
=== Deputy Chief Minister ===
In April 2012 he was nominated to become Guernsey's chief minister. To qualify, nominees need to have served in the States for four of the previous eight years. He became the sole candidate after Deputy Lyndon Trott withdrew. After the length of service qualification was relaxed, he became the Deputy Chief Minister after losing to Peter Harwood by 20-27 votes.

During his tenure as a deputy he sat on the Board of Education and served as President of Overseas Aid and Deputy Minister for the Treasury & Resources Department. From May 2012 to March 2014, he was Guernsey's Home Minister.

In August 2020, Le Tocq joined the Guernsey Partnership of Independents party, formed by Gavin St Pier, Lyndon Trott, and Heidi Soulsby.

=== Chief Minister ===
Peter Harwood resigned as Chief Minister on 25 February 2014 and Le Tocq was elected Chief Minister of Guernsey on 12 March 2014.

In June 2014, Le Tocq hosted a meeting of the British–Irish Council at a hotel in Guernsey. The UK's Deputy Prime Minister Nick Clegg, Taoiseach of Ireland Enda Kenny, First Minister of Northern Ireland Peter Robinson and Deputy First Minister of Northern Ireland Martin McGuinness were among those attending. In January 2015, Le Tocq, and the Chief Minister of Jersey, Senator Ian Gorst, signed an agreement with La Manche and Lower Normandy to develop new links and strengthen existing relationships. Le Tocq and Gorst later paid a joint visit to Brussels on 5–7 May 2015, meeting with two EU Commissioners; Pierre Moscovici, the Commissioner for Economic and Financial Affairs, Taxation and Customs, and Lord Hill, the Commissioner for Financial Stability, Financial Markets and Customs Union.

He lost the position on 4 May 2016, when it was won by Gavin St Pier.

=== Post Chief Minister ===
Le Tocq received 8,002 votes in the June 2025 general election, finishing ninth. In July 2025, following his arrest, the Policy and Resources Committee voted to stop him taking part in any committee business.

== Criminal charges ==
Le Tocq was arrested on 21 July 2025 and released on bail. In August 2025, he was charged with the misuse of telecommunications, indecent images of children and extreme pornography. He was later remanded in custody "for his own protection".

On 4 December 2025, Le Tocq plead guilty to 15 counts related to making and distributing more than 2,400 indecent images of children, including charges of creating no fewer than 13 Category A images depicting real children, and 230 Category A "pseudo-indecent images" Following his plea, he was remanded back into custody by Judge Catherine Fooks while awaiting sentencing. He also resigned as a deputy.

On 26 January 2026, he was sentenced to nine years imprisonment, which he is serving in Guernsey's Les Nicolles prison.

Political offices
Preceded by Peter Harwood	Chief Minister of Guernsey; 2014–2016	Succeeded by Gavin St Pier
