= States of Guernsey =

Governing body of the British Crown dependency of Guernsey

Coordinates: 49.456502°N 2.537997°W

States of Guernsey États de Guernesey
- Coat of arms of Guernsey

Type
- Type: Unicameral

Leadership
- Bailiff: Richard McMahon since May 2020
- President of the Policy and Resources Committee: Lindsay de Sausmarez since 1 July 2025

Structure
- Seats: 40
- Political groups: Independent (35); Forward Guernsey (3); Alderney representatives (2)
- Committees: Policy and Resources; Economic Development; Education, Sport and Culture; Employment and Social Security; Environment and Infrastructure; Health and Social Care; Home Affairs; Housing

Elections
- Last election: 18 June 2025
- Next election: 2030

Meeting place
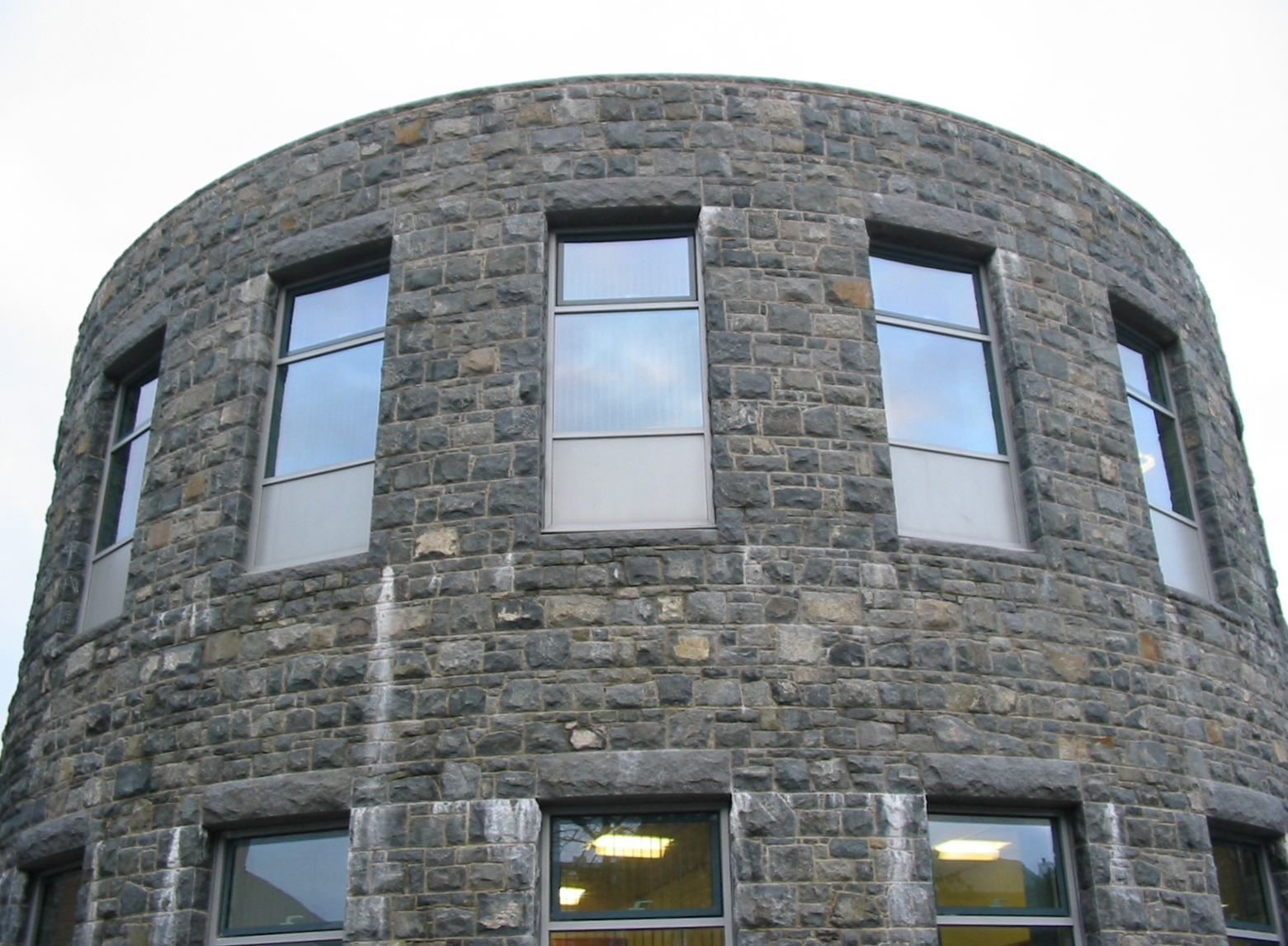
- Royal Court, Saint Peter Port, Guernsey

Website
- parliament.gg

The States of Guernsey (French: États de Guernesey), officially the States of Deliberation and sometimes referred to as the Government of Guernsey, (Note: For example, in the Guernsey–UK Customs Agreement.) is the parliament and government of the British Crown dependency of Guernsey. Some laws and ordinances approved by the States of Guernsey also apply to Alderney and Sark (the other component parts of the Bailiwick of Guernsey, along with Herm) as "Bailiwick-wide legislation" with the consent of the governments of those islands. All enactments of the States of Guernsey apply to Herm as well as Guernsey, since Herm is directly administered by the Bailiwick of Guernsey.

When constituted as a legislature, it is officially called the States of Deliberation. When constituted as an electoral college, it is officially called the States of Election.

The executive functions of the States are carried out using a committee system, comprising one Senior Committee, seven Principal Committees and several other Committees Boards, Authorities and Commissions.

Legislation passed by the States is termed Laws (Loi), which take effect in the island by Order-in-Council. Minor and secondary legislation does not require the assent of the King-in-Council and are known as Ordinances (Ordonnances).

== History ==
The legislature derives its name from the estates (French: états) of the Crown, the Church and the people from whom the assembly was originally summoned. The Jurats, representing the Crown, and the representatives of the Church of England were replaced in the constitutional reforms following the Second World War, when the office of Conseiller was introduced.

Until 2000, there were 33 Deputies elected with three year mandates, and 12 Conseillers representing the Bailiwick, serving terms of six years, with half being elected every three. The Conseillers were not originally directly elected by the people (although latterly directly elected by Bailiwick-wide vote), and the office was abolished before the General Election held that year. The 10 Douzaine representatives (representing parish authorities) were removed from the States in the 2004 constitutional reform and the total of elected deputies rose to the 45 total. In 2016 the number of deputies was reduced to 38.

Following a 2018 referendum, the whole island now forms a single constituency, rather than voting for separate parishes previously, returning 38 members by plurality-at-large voting, beginning with the 2020 election.

=== Firsts ===
First female member of the States

- Marie Randall

First female Chief Minister of Guernsey

- Lindsay de Sausmarez

First female Deputy Chief Minister of Guernsey

- Heidi Soulsby

== Composition ==
The States of Deliberation consists of 38 People's Deputies, elected every four years from a single island-wide constituency by plurality-at-large voting, each voter being allowed to cast up to 38 votes. Before the 2020 election, the electoral system was multi-member districts by plurality block voting, in which each voter can vote for as many candidates as there are seats in the district. Two Alderney Deputies are appointed by the States of Alderney to represent Alderney's interest in matters delegated by Alderney to Guernsey under the 1948 Agreement. The Alderney Representatives are full members of the States of Deliberation, and are chosen from the 10 members of the States of Alderney after an Alderney-wide plebiscite.

There are also two non-voting members being the Law Officers of the Crown - the Procureur (Attorney General) and the Comptroller (Solicitor General) both appointed by the monarch. The Bailiff presides over the States.

== Committee system ==
Guernsey's government operates on a committee system. A similar system used to be used in the neighbouring bailiwick, Jersey; however, this was abolished and replaced with a ministerial government in 2005.

The Senior Committee is known as the Policy & Resources Committee. It is the leading body and in charge of co-ordination of policy and other States work. It oversees the functioning of the States and also has responsibilities for external affairs. The President of the Committee is often termed "Chief Minister" by the local media, as they are perceived to represent the island's government, especially abroad. They are elected by States Members and hold a term of office expiring at the next general election. The next election will be in June 2025.

Name	President	Responsibilities	Note
Policy & Resources Committee	Lindsay de Sausmarez	Co-ordination of policy and other States work. Oversees functioning of the States and responsibilities for external affairs	

The remaining Principal Committees are listed below:

Name	President	Responsibilities
Economic Development	Deputy Sasha Kazantseva-Miller	Promotion and development of the economy, competition and regulation, broadcasting and media etc.
Education, Sport & Culture	Deputy Paul Montague	Education, sport, leisure, libraries, museums, the arts, Island archives and civic celebrations
Employment & Social Security	Deputy Tina Bury	Social Insurance & pensions, social housing, income support, health and safety (workplace), legal aid and industrial relations
Environment & Infrastructure	Deputy Adrian Gabriel	Land use, agriculture, roads, public transport, energy, waste, environmental policy
Health & Social Care	Deputy George Oswald	Adult social care, children and young people, elder care, physical and mental health
Home Affairs	Deputy Marc Leadbeater	Crime, justice, population management, prison, fire and rescue, civil defence, emergency planning, gambling and electoral roll
Housing	Deputy Steve Williams	Housing

The remaining committees, all chaired by States Members, are the Development and Planning Authority, Transport Licensing Authority, Overseas Aid & Development Commission, States' Trading Supervisory Board, States Assembly & Constitution Committee, Scrutiny Management Committee and the Civil Contingencies Authority.

== Recent elections ==
The last general election was on 18 June 2025.

- 2025 results
- 2020 results
- 2016 results
- 2012 results
- 2008 results

== Current deputies and representatives ==
Constitution of the States of Deliberation as of June 2025: Deputies

- Lindsay De Sausmarez
- Yvonne Burford
- Charles Parkinson
- Steve Falla
- Paul Montague
- Sasha Kazantseva-Miller
- Gavin St Pier
- Tina Bury
- Jonathan Le Tocq
- Chris Blin
- George Oswald
- Marc Laine
- Aidan Matthews
- Marc Leadbeater
- Andy Cameron
- Sally Rochester
- Adrian Gabriel
- Lee Van Katwyk
- Liam McKenna
- Mark Helyar
- Steve Williams
- John Gollop
- David Goy
- Tom Rylatt
- Jennifer Strachan
- Simon Vermeulen
- Munazza Malik
- Jayne Ozanne
- Andy Sloan
- Bruno Kay-Mouat
- Haley Camp
- Garry Collins
- Andrew Niles
- Rob Curgenven
- Neil Inder
- David Dorrity
- Rhona Humphreys
- Sarah Hansmann Rouxel

Alderney representatives

- Steve Roberts
- Alex Snowdon

== See also ==
- States of Jersey
- The States
- List of Laws of Guernsey
