= Politics of Alderney =

Political system of the British Crown Dependencies of Alderney

Politics of Alderney takes place in a framework of a parliamentary representative democratic British Crown dependency, whereby the President of the States of Alderney is the head of government. Alderney is part of the Bailiwick of Guernsey but is largely self-governing.

== History ==
Before the 1949 reforms, Alderney's legislature had no political affiliation as all positions in the States of Alderney (French: États d'Aurigny) were appointed. It consisted of the Governor of Alderney, until the holder in 1825 sold it back to the Crown and no further appointments were made, the Judge of Alderney, six Jurats, Alderney's court officers, a Douzainier-Delegate and four Douzainiers appointed by the Alderney ratepayers. In 1923, the first democratically elected members were created with three People's Deputies being added to the States of Alderney.

Until the reform of 1948, the States of Alderney consisted of:

- Governor of Alderney (vacant from 1825)
- the Judge (appointed by the Crown, equivalent of the Bailiff in Guernsey and Jersey)
- 6 Jurats (appointed by the Crown)
- the officers of the Court of Alderney
- 4 Douzainiers (elected annually by the ratepayers)
- a Douzainier-Delegate (appointed by the Douzaine)
- 3 People's Deputies (elected by the voters for a three-year mandate; added in 1923)

=== 1949 constitution ===
In 1949, a new constitution for Alderney was instituted with Alderney becoming part of the Bailiwick of Guernsey. The States of Alderney's membership was changed because of the law.

The States of Alderney was made up of the President of the States of Alderney and nine elected members. Two members of the States of Alderney are also selected to represent Alderney in the States of Guernsey.

=== Autonomy ===
While Alderney enjoys full autonomy in law (except in matters of foreign affairs and defence, as the other Channel Islands and the Isle of Man), under the provisions of a formal agreement (known as "the 1948 Agreement") entered into between the Government of Alderney and the Government of Guernsey, certain matters have been delegated to Guernsey. These are known as 'the transferred services'.

Transferred services include policing, customs and excise, airport operations, health, education, social services, childcare and adoption. (The States of Alderney retains policy control of aviation to and from the Island).

In return for the cost of providing the transferred services, Guernsey levies various taxes and duties on Alderney.

== Current office holders ==
The States of Alderney now consists of:

- President, directly elected every four years

The President of the States of Alderney is William Tate; who was elected in 2019 and re-elected in 2020.

- Ten States Members, half elected every two years for a four-year mandate. The whole island is a single constituency.

Elected in 2018	Note [2]	Elected in 2020	Note [3]
Annie Burgess		Alex Snowdon	[1]
Christian Harris		Ian Carter	
Steve Roberts	[1]	Kevin Gentle	
Graham McKinley		Rhys Jenkins	
Bill Abel	[4]	Boyd Kelly	

Notes:

Note [1] Alderney representatives to the States of Guernsey

Note [2] The members elected in 2018 hold office until 2022

Note [3] The members elected in 2020 hold office until 2024

Note [4] Elected in 2020 Alderney by-election to hold office until 2022

=== Future elections ===
A 2022 general election will be held to elect 5 members.

in 2024 a general election will be held to elect 5 members and to elect the president.

=== Political parties ===
There are no political parties in Alderney mirroring a similar situation in fellow Channel Islands, Jersey and Guernsey where all people standing for election are non-affiliated. In 2005, the President Sir Norman Browse made a call for members not to become affiliated with "pressure groups and single issue causes".

== See also ==
- Elections in Alderney
- President of the States of Alderney
- States of Alderney Member
- Leader of Alderney
