= 2008 Alderney general election =

General elections to the States were held in Alderney on 6 December 2008 in accordance with the rules governing elections in Alderney. All five elected members were independents. The results were complicated by the first ever tie in Alderney's electoral history, between John Beaman and Don Oakden, both with 294 votes. After the drawing of a name from the ballot box by the returning officer, Beaman was elected in fifth place.

== Results ==
Summary of the 6 December 2008 States of Alderney election results
Candidates	Votes
Peter Allen (Elected)	520
Boyd Kelly (Elected)	409
Geoffrey Sargent (Elected)	376
Bill Walden (Elected)	312
John Beaman (Elected)	294
Don Oakden	294
Barry Pengilley	220
Lin Maurice	201
Lois FitzGerald	199
Martin Hunt	98
