= 2016 Alderney general election =

← 2014	26 November 2016	2018 →

5 of the 10 seats in the States of Alderney

General elections were held in Alderney on 26 November 2016 to elect five members of the States of Alderney to serve until 2020. Prospective candidates were required to be formally nominated before 15 November.

== Results ==
Candidate	Votes	%	Notes
James Dent	624	66.38	Elected
Louis Jean	527	56.06	Elected
Alex Snowdon	480	51.06	Elected
Mike Dean	381	40.53	Elected
Tony Barnes	294	31.28	Elected
Paul Clark	266	28.30	
Neil Harvey	251	26.70	
Tony Haywood	242	25.74	
Debbie Lewis	222	23.62	
Christopher Rowley	195	20.74	
Lin Maurice	164	17.45	
Francis Simonet	146	15.53	
Simon Wild	117	12.45	
Total	3,909	100.00	
Valid votes	940	100.00	
Invalid/blank votes	0	0.00	
Total votes	940	100.00	
Source: States of Alderney
