= Leader of Alderney =

The Leader of Alderney is the civil leader of Alderney. Alderney is a dependency of the Bailiwick of Guernsey. Its leader has traditionally been appointed by the British Crown and has been known by various titles including Lord of Alderney, Governor of Alderney, and the current President of the States of Alderney. The President of the States of Alderney is directly elected every four years and there is no constitutional limit to the number of terms served. The current president, William Tate has held the post since 2019.

== Current function ==
The Leader of Alderney is the highest civil figure in Alderney. The President as leader currently is elected by all of Alderney for a four-year term. The President is also the chairman of the States of Alderney and entitled to vote; however, this is usually only done in the event of a tied vote, where he has the deciding vote.

== Historical role ==
Alderney was initially part of the Duchy of Normandy from 933 AD. In 1042, possession of Alderney passed to Mont Saint Michel Abbey and from there, passed to the Bishop of Coutances. In 1182, the first individual leader of Alderney was William L'Ingenieur who was ennobled as Lord of Alderney. During L'Ingenieur's time as Lord of Alderney, possession was granted to him as a fief. As a result of this, Alderney was invaded and occupied by the French twice in 1204 and 1205 before being reclaimed by England each time. Under his successor as Lord of Alderney, Peter L'Ingenieur, ownership of Alderney was divided between the King of England (as the Duke of Normandy) and the Bishop of Coutances. In 1228, the title of the Lord of Alderney became extinct as Peter L'Ingenieur had no lawfully begotten male heirs. During this time France invaded Alderney again before being expelled by English forces, with King Henry III of England stripping the Bishop of the rights to Alderney and taking sole ownership as a result of the French actions. Under the Treaty of Brétigny in 1260, the Bishop's rights in Alderney were restored.

In 1559, George Chamberlain was appointed as the Lieutenant-Governor of Alderney and later bought the title and lease of Alderney from the Crown. In 1586 Queen Elizabeth I of England ordered the Bishop of Coutances surrender the rights to Alderney to the Bishop of Winchester, which was done shortly after the leadership of Alderney had passed to Robert Devereux, 2nd Earl of Essex despite the Earl of Essex never visiting Alderney. During the English Civil War and the Commonwealth of England, leadership of Alderney changed hands several times between the Royalists and Parliamentarians with Nicholas Ling being appointed as the Lieutenant-Governor of Alderney by Oliver Cromwell. In 1660, during the Restoration of the Monarchy, Edward de Carteret was granted the title of Governor of Alderney by King Charles II of England as a reward for loyalty to the Crown and became the leader of Alderney as a result, with Ling remaining as Lieutenant-Governor. Alderney was also separated from Guernsey as a result of the creation of the governorship. The governorship went into abeyance after the death of his son, Edward de Carteret, before being sold to Sir Edmund Andros by de Carteret's widow. Andros then was granted the governorship on a 99-year lease from the Crown in exchange for an annual 13 shillings payment of rent to the Crown. The Governor of Alderney became a hereditary position and later passed to the Le Mesurier family through marriage with the Andros family. The lease was later extended by King George III of Great Britain. In 1825 the governor, John Le Mesurier III, resigned the grant of the island and returned it to the Crown in exchange for an annual pension of £700 (approximately £51,300). This agreement eventually expired in 1862.

After the office of Governor of Alderney was abolished, the Judge of Alderney assumed the role of leader of Alderney as the highest ranking appointed representative of the Crown on the island. The Judge of Alderney was the leader of Alderney as well as the head of Alderney's judiciary. This lasted until the Second World War when Alderney and the rest of the Channel Islands were occupied by Nazi Germany and the leadership of Alderney was assumed by German officials. Most of Alderney's population had been evacuated and the Nazis used Alderney as a base to build the Atlantic Wall and the Alderney camps. Thus during the war, the concentration camp commandants and administrators took over as leaders of Alderney.

When the Channel Islands were liberated, the Judge of Alderney regained leadership of Alderney. However, by 1947 less than 50% of Alderney's population had returned to the island. This led to the Parliament of the United Kingdom discussing what to do with Alderney as land ownership markers and official papers had been destroyed in the war and Alderney's economy was stagnating as a result of more than half of the islanders not returning. The United Kingdom's Home Secretary, Chuter Ede recommended "Guernseyfication" of Alderney. In 1948 His Majesty's Privy Council decided that Alderney would become a part of the Bailiwick of Guernsey again. Later in the year, both the States of Alderney and the States of Guernsey voted through the Alderney (Application of Legislation) Law which gave powers to the States of Guernsey in respect of certain "transferred services" in 1949. The law also provided for a democratically elected President of the States of Alderney to be the Leader of Alderney as the Judge of Alderney had been superseded as the representative of the Crown on Alderney by the Lieutenant Governor of Guernsey.

== List of Leaders of Alderney ==
Ruler	Reigns of rulers
Lord of Alderney
William L'Ingenieur	1182–c. 1222
Peter L'Ingenieur and Mayn L'Ingenieur	c. 1222–1238
Vacant	1238–1290
Guardian
Raoul Eudes (Guardian)	1290–1302 or after
Vacant	1302 or after–1376
Governor
Thomas Porteman	1376–1379
Vacant	1379–1546
Marshal
Robert de Turberville	1546–1559
Lieutenant governor
George Chamberlaine, Baron of Guernsey	1559–1584
John Chamberlain of Longcombe, Baron Oxfordshire	29 May 1584 – 30 September 1585
Vacant	30 September 1585 – 26 March 1590
Robert Devereux, 2nd Earl of Essex	26 March 1590 – 25 February 1601
Vacant	25 February 1601 – 1604
Robert Devereux, 3rd Earl of Essex	1604–1607
William Chamberlain I	1607–1608
John Chamberlain I	1608
William Chamberlain II	1608 – c. November 1615
John Chamberlain II	1615 – c. March 1618
Chamberlain	1618–1630s
Mary Colles (1st time)	1630s–1639
John Colles	3 March 1639 – 27 October 1639
William Colles	27 October 1639 – 1642
Mary Colles (2nd time)	1642–1646
Peter Le Febvre, surier de L'Epine (pretender)	3 November 1643 – 1646
Peter de Beauvoir de Bosq	25 March 1646 – 1648
Benjamin Lemprière	11 March 1648 – 1651
George Mishaw (1st time)	June 1651 – 1651
John Ring	1651–1654
George Mishaw (2nd time)	23 June 1654 – 1650s
Sir William Essex	1650s–1658
Nicholas Ling	21 May 1658 – 1659
William Andros	13 July 1659 – 1660
Governor
Edward de Carteret	5 May 1660 – 1660
Sir George Carteret	1660 – 14 January 1679
Nicholas Ling (interim for Carteret)	16 August 1661 – 6 January 1679
George Mishaw (interim for Carteret)	6 January 1679 – 14 January 1680
Elizabeth de Carteret	14 January 1680 – 1682
Edward Le Breton (1st time) (interim for de Carteret to 1682)	1682 – 29 August 1683
Sir Edmund Andros	29 August 1683 – 24 February 1714
Edward Le Breton (2nd time) (interim for Andros)	29 August 1683 – 3 March 1684
Thomas Le Mesurier (1st time) (interim for Andros)	31 March 1684 – 1 September 1690
Thomas Le Marchant (interim for Andros)	1 September 1690 – 1 September 1696
Charles Le Marchant (interim for Andros)	1 September 1696 – 21 July 1703
Thomas Le Mesurier (2nd time) (interim for Andros)	21 July 1703 – 1714
George Andros	1714
Thomas Le Mesurier (interim) (3rd time)	1713 – 22 July 1714
John Le Mesurier I (interim) (1st time)	22 July 1714 – 1714
Ann Andros	February 1714–1721
John Le Mesurier I (2nd time) (interim [for Andros to 1721])	1714–1722
Anne Le Mesurier	1722–1729
Nicholas Reserson (interim for Ann Le Mesurier)	17 February 1728 – 1729
Thomas Le Cocq (pretender until 1729)	26 March 1726 – 1730
Henry Le Mesurier	6 February 1730 – 1744
John Le Mesurier II	1744 – 12 March 1793
John Le Cocq (acting for Le Mesurier)	2 November 1745 – 1763
Peter Le Mesurier (3 December 1770 – 16 March 1793 acting for John Le Mesurier)	16 March 1793 – 9 January 1803
John Le Mesurier III	21 January 1803 – 13 April 1825
Judge
Pierre Gauvin	1 August 1807 – 2 April 1836
Jean Gauvain (interim)	2 April 1836 – 11 April 1836
Thomas Le Cocq (interim)	11 April 1836 – 28 April 1836
Nicholas Barbenson (1st time) (interim)	28 April 1836 – 26 November 1836
Jean Gaudion	26 November 1836 – 21 September 1856
Nicholas Barbenson (2nd time) (interim)	29 November 1836 – 15 December 1856
Thomas Clucas	15 December 1856 – 30 April 1876
Jean Pezet (interim)	1 May 1876 – 9 October 1876
Thomas Nicholas Barbenson	9 October 1876 – October 1892
Peter Herivel (interim)	October 1892 – 17 December 1892
John A. Le Cocq	17 December 1892 – May 1897
Nicholas Peter Barbenson	5 June 1897 – 1912
Robert Walter Mellish	12 April 1913 – 15 March 1938
A.C. Tourgis (interim)	March 1938 – 16 July 1938
Frederick G. French	16 July 1938 – November 1947
Inselkommandant Alderney (Military)
Hauptmann Karl Hoffman	27 July 1941 – December 1941
Gleden	December 1941 – January 1942
Oberstleutnant Rohde	January 1942
Oberst Zuske	February 1942 – November 1943
Oberstleutnant Schwalm	November 1943 – May 1945
Sonderführer von Alderney (Civil)
Schmidt	2 July 1940 – 1940
Koch	1940–1941
Heinz Herzog	1941 – April 1942
Hans Spann	April 1942 – March 1944
Wilhelm Richter	March 1944 – 16 May 1945
Judge
Daniel Le Cocq (interim)	November 1947 – 15 December 1947
Sir Frank Henry Cafande Wiltshire	15 December 1947 – 31 December 1948
President of Alderney
Sydney Peck Herivel	1 January 1949 – 26 August 1970
George William Baron (1st time)	1970–1977
Jon Kay-Mouat (1st time)	1977–1994
George William Baron (2nd time)	1994–1997
Jon Kay-Mouat (2nd time)	1997 – 19 January 2002
Sir Norman Browse	19 January 2002 – 22 June 2011
Stuart Trought	22 June 2011 – 15 May 2019
James Dent - Interim President	15 May 2019 - 28 June 2019
William Tate	28 June 2019 – present

== See also ==
- President of the States of Alderney

== Books ==
- Clarke, Louisa L. (1851). The Island of Alderney; Its Early History, Antiquities, Present State, Scenery, Customs, and Trade. Longman, Brown, Green, & Longmans.
- Sanders, Paul (2005). The British Channel Islands Under German Occupation 1940 – 1945. Jersey Heritage Trust. p. 192. ISBN 0-9538858-3-6.
