= 2014 Alderney general election =

General elections were held in Alderney on 22 November 2014 in accordance with the rules governing elections in Alderney. Five of the ten seats in the States were up for election.

== Results ==
Candidate	Votes	%	Notes
Ian Tugby	467	13.25	Elected
Matt Birmingham	446	12.66	Elected
Graham McKinley	410	11.63	Elected
Norma Paris	401	11.38	Elected
Steve Roberts	360	10.22	Elected
Tony Haywood	356	10.10	
Lin Maurice	240	6.81	
Tony Barnes	220	6.24	
Anthony Llewellyn	193	5.48	
Colly Coleman	172	4.88	
Geoff Le Prevost	134	3.80	
Caroline Ely	125	3.55	
Invalid/blank votes	0	–	–
Total			–
Registered voters/turnout	1,267	69.4	–
Source: States

== See also ==
- States of Alderney Member
