= John Beaman =

British politician (born 1951)

States of Alderney Member John Beaman
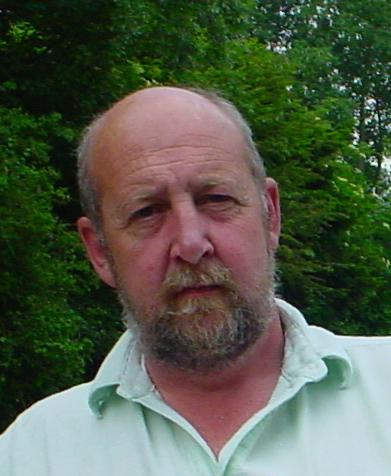
- In office 1 January 2009 – 31 December 2013

States Member for Tourism, Agriculture, Open Areas, The Environment, Wildlife and Burhou

Personal details
- Born: 5 October 1951 (age 74) Castleford, Yorkshire, UK
- Spouse: Anne Beaman

John Richard Beaman (born 5 October 1951) was formerly one of the ten States of Alderney Members, and he became the Chairman of the influential Policy and Finance Committee in January 2011. Prior to this, he was the Island’s Representative for Tourism. As well as chairman of the Policy and Finance Committee, Beaman was a member of the committees on Employment Legislation, and General Services, and the representative for agriculture, open areas, environment, wildlife, and the island of Burhou. Beaman's term of office ended in 2013.

== Early life ==
Born in Castleford, Beaman was educated at The King's School, Pontefract. He attended the University of Bradford, before moving to Madeley in Staffordshire to train as a mathematics teacher. From 1976 to 1985, Beaman worked as a teacher, first in schools, and later with children in care. From 1985 to 2005, Beaman worked for Staffordshire and then for Stoke-on-Trent in the Looked-after-children (LAC) department.

== Political career ==
Beaman was elected as a member of the States of Alderney in December 2008 after a controversial election in which he gained the same number of votes (294) as Don Oakden, who was not elected. This was the first tie in the island’s electoral history, and was resolved by the returning officer picking Beaman’s name from a ballot box, which led to his selection as the fifth member. Beaman was announced as States Representative for Tourism on 18 February 2009. In his acceptance interview he declared an awareness of the island’s shortcomings as a tourist destination and pledged to work with local groups to improve the island’s standing. He also drew attention for his refusal to vote for an increase in pay for States Members and for being the only States Member to vote against the setting-up of a housing association.

On 12 January 2011 Beaman was elected as the chairman of the island's Policy and Finance (P&F) committee, the States' main decision-making body. He polled five votes, narrowly beating fellow states member Ian Tugby. In his post-election speech, Beaman said that he intended to involve all states members in the island's decision-making process, announcing "Each member has got something to offer and I want to include everybody".

== Personal life ==
In 1976 John married Anne, a schoolteacher, and they have a son named Robert. They both work in their spare time at the Alderney Lighthouse as tour guides. He is a fan of rugby league supporting Castleford Tigers, and was head coach of Derby City RLFC from 2000 until 2001. He has also written a guide book, Eight Walks on Alderney, which has been translated into French.
