= Longis =

Longis is a settlement in the south-east of Alderney in the Channel Islands, United Kingdom. It has a beach, an island fort, a nature reserve, and remains of German, Roman and prehistoric occupation.

== Roman fort ==
In Longis, there is a small Roman fort, dating back to the 4th century AD. It is known locally as The Nunnery. Though it was originally suspected to be a Roman fort, this assertion was not proved until 2011 when an archaeological dig affirmed the presence of Roman architecture. After the Romans left Alderney, the nunnery had no evidence of use again until the Middle Ages through to the Tudor period. It later became home to the Governors of Alderney. After the excavations, it became an Alderney visitors centre. During the German occupation of the Channel Islands, the Nazis used The Nunnery as a barracks for German soldiers.

== Occupation ==
During the Nazi occupation, an anti-tank wall was constructed at Longis on the beach. The site at Longis provides evidence of forced labour under German rule during World War II, with several slave labourers being buried in mass graves underneath Longis Common. The graves were under threat following a plan to link the electric grids of the United Kingdom, France and Alderney that would pass through the gravesite. The licences for the project were approved by the States of Guernsey, however the States of Alderney refused planning permission on the grounds that it would disturb the graves.
