= 2000 Alderney general election =

General elections were held in Alderney on 9 December 2000. Five of the ten seats in the States were up for election.

== Results ==
Candidate	Votes	%
Colin Williams	625	18.00
Ralph Burridge	527	15.18
Bill Walden	479	13.80
Edwin Sebire	408	11.75
Chris Main	384	11.06
Barry Pengilley	347	9.99
John Russell	282	8.12
Colin Murfitt	227	6.54
Paul Southcott	128	3.69
Louis Jean	65	1.87
Total	3,472	100.00
Valid votes	850	99.42
Invalid/blank votes	5	0.58
Total votes	855	100.00
Registered voters/turnout	1,309	65.32
