= Elections in Alderney =

Elections in Alderney are held for the positions both of President and Member of the States of Alderney. The President of the States of Alderney is directly elected every four years. Half of the ten States Members are elected every two years for a four-year mandate. In 2014 1,267 people were registered to vote. The whole island is a single constituency.

== States Members ==
=== Pre-1948 ===
Prior to The Government of Alderney Law 1948, the States of Alderney consisted of the Lieutenant Governor of Guernsey, the Judge of Alderney, six jurats, the officers of the Court of Alderney, four Douzainiers, one Douzainier-Delegate, and three People's Deputies. Ratepayers elected the Douzainiers each year, the People's Deputies were elected by popular vote every three years, and the Jurats were elected by popular vote.

=== Post-1948 ===
The Government of Alderney Law 1948 introduced the modern structure of the States of Alderney. This law set the number of members at nine and the term of office at three years, with elections for one-third of the states every year using an island-wide constituency and plurality block voting. The 1987 law increased the number of members to twelve, keeping the method of election the same.

The 2004 law set the number of States members at ten (taking effect at the 2008 election) and the current cycle of four year terms, with half of the States elected every second year from an island-wide constituency using plurality block voting. The most recent of these elections was held in 2024. The age of suffrage has been 16 since the 2022 election.

In January 2026, The Policy and Finance Committee of the States of Alderney supported reducing the number of elected representatives to eight by the time of the 2028 election.

== States of Guernsey Members ==
Under The Reform (Guernsey) Law 1948, two seats of the States of Guernsey are reserved for members of the States of Alderney. Additionally, until 1993, Alderney was entitled to four seats in the States of Election when electing Conseillers.

Since 2006, following each ordinary election, a plebiscite is held to determine which members of the States of Alderney shall also sit in the States of Guernsey, with the first and second candidates selected as representatives and the third and fourth candidates selected as alternate representatives. This is non-binding - the States of Alderney still select the representatives - though the States of Alderney have selected the winners of the plebiscite on every occasion.

A consultation began in February 2026 to review the future of the plebiscite.

== President ==
The Government of Alderney Law 1948 provided for a directly elected President of the States of Alderney, which was first elected in 1949. This act set the term of office at three years, though the 2004 law extended the term in office to four years. The president is elected using a first-past-the-post system across the entire island. The most recent presidential election was held in 2024.

== Voters ==
Voters are eligible to be inscribed on the electoral roll of Alderney if they are:

- 15 or over (being able to vote from the age 16);
- have been ordinarily resident in Alderney for 12 months up to 15 October of the year in which inscription is requested;
- are ordinarily resident in Alderney;
- are not subject to a legal disability.

Absent voters may use a "Postal" or "Proxy" vote.

== See also ==
- Politics of Alderney
- States of Alderney Member
