= Sweetnam =

Sweetnam is a surname. Notable people with the surname include:

- Darren Sweetnam (born 1993), Irish rugby union player
- Nancy Sweetnam (born 1973), Canadian former competition swimmer
- Rodney Sweetnam (1927–2013), British orthopaedic surgeon
- Skye Sweetnam (born 1988), Canadian singer-songwriter
- James Sweetnam (born 1982), British racing driver
