= 2024 in Guernsey =

Events in the year 2024 in Guernsey.

== Incumbents ==
- Duke of Normandy: Charles III
- Lieutenant governor: Richard Cripwell
- Chief minister: Lyndon Trott
- Bailiff: Richard McMahon

== Events ==
- 16 November: 2024 Alderney general election

== Sports ==
- 21 April: 2024 World Bowls Indoor Championships
