= 2004 Alderney general election =

The 2004 Alderney general election was held on 11 December 2004 to elect 5 of the 10 members of the States of Alderney. Barbara Benfield, Lin Maurice, Bill Walden, Chris Main and Barry Pengilley were elected. Debbie Burgess, Ralph Burridge, Susan Allan, Gill Lowe, Lois Fitzgerald and Liz Bennett failed to get elected.
