= Judge of Alderney =

The Judge of Alderney is the senior judicial officer in Alderney, ranking above the six Jurats. The holder was until 1949 entitled to a seat in the States of Alderney, and between 1825 and 1949 was Leader of Alderney.

== History ==
The Judge of Alderney is a legally qualified person appointed by the Crown to be chief judge of Alderney, sitting with the Jurats (lay judges) in cases heard there. The position is equivalent to that of a judge of the King’s Bench Division of the High Court of Justice of England and Wales. Appeals from decisions of the court may be made to the Judicial Committee of the Privy Council.

In 1825, the hereditary Governor of Alderney, John Le Mesurier III, returned his family's fiefdom over Alderney to the Crown in exchange for an annual pension. That office of governor being thus in effect abolished, the Judge of Alderney, as highest Crown appointment there, assumed the role of leader.

During the Second World War, the Channel Islands were occupied by Nazi Germany, and the Judge, who had gone to England, was effectively replaced as leader of Alderney by Island Commandant Inselkommandant Alderney and a designated Sonderführer von Alderney.

After the war, less than 50% of Alderney's population returned, which led to the United Kingdom government proposing that Alderney become part of the Bailiwick of Guernsey. In 1948, the States of Alderney and the States of Guernsey passed laws under which Alderney gave up sovereignty to Guernsey. It was also provided that the Judge of Alderney be replaced as Leader of Alderney by the democratically elected President of the States of Alderney, the role of Representative of the Crown being fulfilled by the Lieutenant-Governor of Guernsey. Further, the Judge's right to sit in the States of Alderney was removed, judiciary and legislature now being more separated.

== See also ==
- Leader of Alderney
