= Sarah Kelly (advocate) =

Lawyer

Sarah Elizabeth Kelly
- Born: London, England
- Education: University of Caen Normandy
- Occupation: Lawyer
- Known for: Greffier to the Jurats of Alderney

Sarah Elizabeth Kelly is a legal professional who was appointed Greffier to the Jurats of Alderney in 2005 – the first female to hold the position in the Island's history. She remained in the post until 2015.

== Career ==
Born in London, Sarah Kelly studied Norman French law at Caen University in Normandy, France. She was admitted a solicitor with the English Law Society in November 1997, and practised in England before moving to Alderney in 1999. Kelly then became the island's first female Clerk to the Court, a role which included her being Registrar of Births, Deaths and Marriages, Company Registrar and Land Registrar. In 2005, she became the first woman to be appointed Greffier to the island's Jurats, which entails providing legal and procedural advice to the six senior justices. She left the post in 2015 and was succeeded by Jonathan Anderson. She has subsequently been at the Alderney Gambling Control Commission.

== Personal life ==
Her estranged husband, Boyd Kelly, is a retired West Midlands Police officer who has been a member of the States of Alderney.
