= 2018 Alderney general election =

General election held in Alderney

← 2016	1 December 2018	2020 →

5 of the 10 seats in the States of Alderney

The 2018 Alderney general election was held on 1 December 2018 to elect 5 members of the States of Alderney who will serve until 2022.

== Results ==
Candidate	Votes	%	Notes
Annie Burgess	665	15.6	Elected
Christian Harris	664	15.6	Elected
Steve Roberts	658	15.5	Elected
Graham McKinley	445	10.5	Elected
David Earl	435	10.2	Elected
Kevin Gentle	329	7.7	
Hilary Bentley	286	6.7	
Bill Walden	249	5.8	
Victor Levine	209	4.9	
Paul Clark	130	3.0	
Sally Pond	117	2.7	
Chris Bennett	70	1.6	
Total	4,257	100	
Valid votes		100	
Invalid/blank votes	0	0.0	
Total		100	
Registered voters/turnout		~66	
Source: Government of Alderney

== 2018 By-election ==
After Tony Barnes resigned, a by-election was held on 17 December 2018. The winner will serve until December 2020.

Candidate	Votes	%
Kevin Gentle	366	49.73
Hilary Bentley	176	23.91
Nick Winder	135	18.34
Susan McDowall	59	8.02
Total	736	100.00
Valid votes	749	99.87
Invalid/blank votes	1	0.13
Total votes	750	100.00
Registered voters/turnout		50%

== 2020 by-election ==
A by-election was held on 10 October 2020 to replace David Earl, who had resigned in August 2020. Two candidates stood for election, the winner will serve until December 2022.

Candidate	Votes	%	Notes
Bill Abel	321	60.1	Elected
Hilary Bentley	205	39.9	
Total	526	100	
Valid votes	534	100	
Invalid/blank votes	8	0.0	
Total	542	100	
Registered voters/turnout		~36	
Source: Government of Alderney
