= St Anne's Church, Alderney =

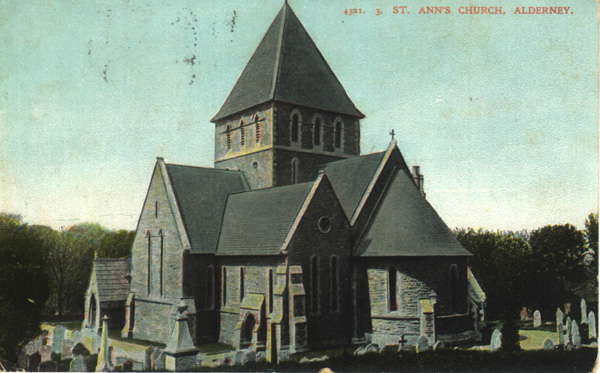
- 49°42′56″N 2°12′18″W

The St Anne's Church, dedicated to St Anne, Mother of the Blessed Virgin Mary, is centrally located in the St Anne town on the side of a hill between Victoria Street (from which it is approached through the Albert Gate) and La Vallee. It is surrounded by a churchyard which dates back to at least the 7th century and once had a contemporaneous chapel on the site. During the 12th or 13th centuries the chapel was replaced with a new one on the same site, with subsequent additions to the building in 1561 and 1767. The present church was designed by George Gilbert Scott, a renowned architect of Victorian buildings. Renovation of the old church involved the demolition of an ancient medieval building in the old churchyard, next to the present day island museum. The clock tower of the old church and the cemetery were retained, however. The renovation was completed and consecration held in 1850. Reverend Canon John Le Mesurier, son of the last Hereditary Governor of Alderney, built it in memory of his parents and fully met the cost of renovation, then estimated at £8,000.

The main church, cruciform in the “transitional style from Norman to Early English with a clear French influence”, is an ornate structure built of local granite with Caen stone dressings, with a high altar with solid round pillars and the nave supporting towering arches. It became an archetype model for six other churches built by the same architect. The original six Victorian bells were removed during the German invasion; four were taken to Cherbourg to be melted for making munitions, and two were found in Alderney. All six bells were recast by Taylor's of Loughborough in 1953.

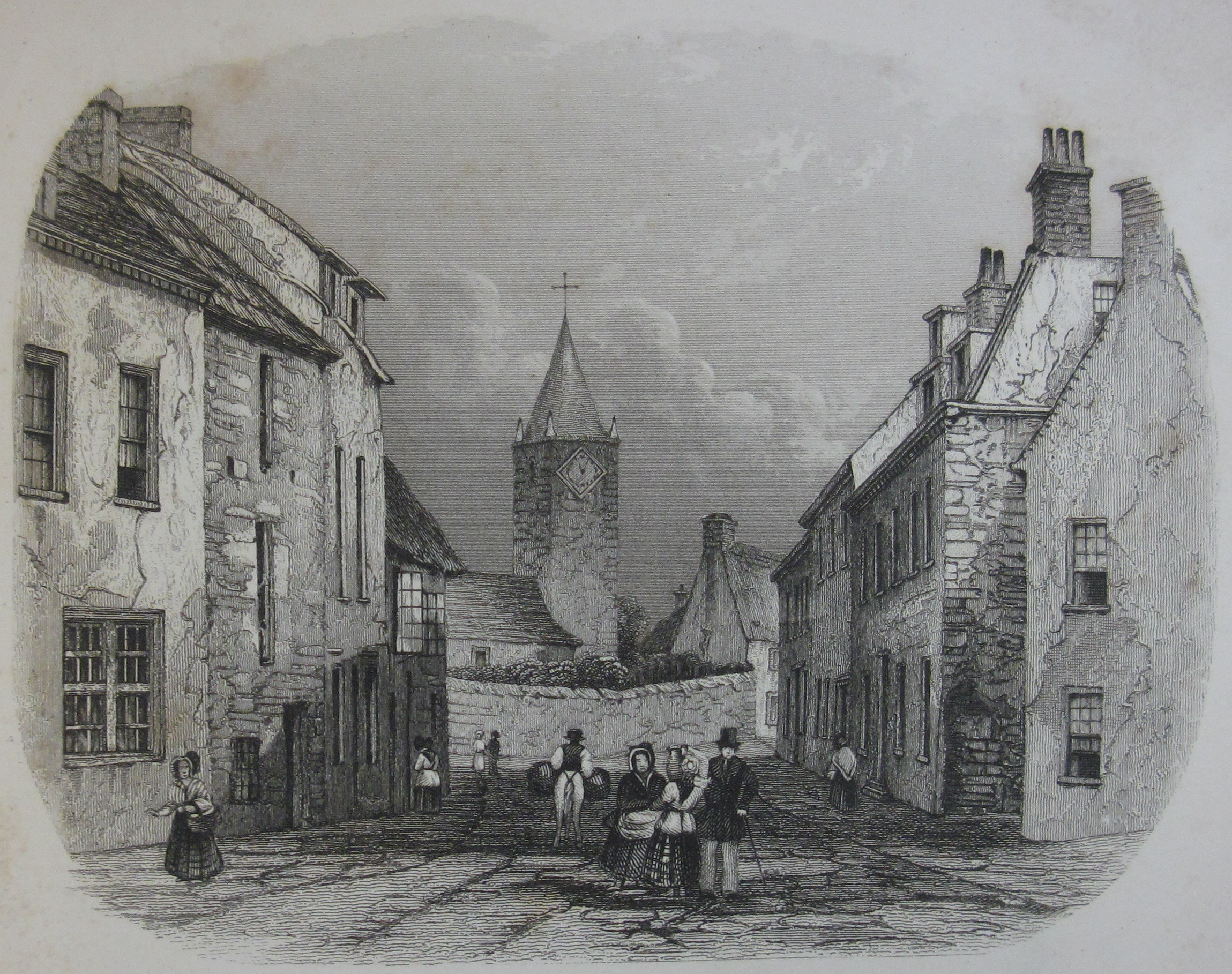
Historical view of Saint Anne, church in background

During the Second World War, when the town was under German occupation and all its citizens had vacated the town, the church was used as a store, and its premises were damaged. A machine-gun post was set up then in the belfry, and still-visible graffiti on the stone work left by soldiers bears mute witness to the occupation. Pews had been removed from the church premises. After the war, the church figured in substantial restoration work in the town, completed in 1953. The Bishop of Winchester rededicated the church on 11 June of that year. A redeeming event recorded in 1998 was the restoration of an old Bible dated 1683 and bound in with a copy of the Book of Common Prayer and a Metrical Psalter dated 1679. It was partially damaged by dampness but had been substituted with manuscript sheets exquisitely engraved in small copper plates. The Bible was restored to the church by the widow of a soldier who had taken it from there and had stored it in his library in Germany.

In view of its large size, the church is called the “Cathedral of the Channel Islands.” It was intended to serve not only as a parish church but also as a fortified garrison for the defence forces stationed in the island. Approach to the present church is through the Albert Memorial Entrance, which is a granite arch with wrought iron gates, opposite to Oliver Street.
