= 2024 Alderney general election =

General election held in Alderney

- 16 November 2024; 30 November 2024; 7 December 2024

5 of the 10 seats in the States of Alderney President of the States 2 representatives in the States of Guernsey

Elections were held in Alderney in 2024. Elections for 5 of the 10 seats of the States were held on 16 November. An election for the President of the States was held on 30 November. Finally, a plebiscite election to choose the two members of the States to represent Alderney in the States of Guernsey was held on 7 December.

== Dates of the Election ==
=== Timetable ===
Key dates
| Date | Event |
|---|---|
| 13 May | The Policy and Finance Committee propose the election dates of dates of 16 November (States), 30 November (Presidency of the States), and 7 December (Representatives of Alderney in the Guernsey States). |
| 10 July | The States unanimously approve the aforementioned dates of the elections. |
| 15 October | Deadline to register to vote. |
| 24 October | Nominations to stand as a States Member opens. |
| 1 November | Nominations to stand as States Member close. |
| 7 November | Nominations to stand as president open. |
| 15 November | Nominations to stand as president close. |
| 16 November | Election for 5 of the 10 members of the States who will serve until 2028. |
| 30 November | Election for the President of the States for a term of 4 years ending 2028. |
| 7 December | Plebiscite election to decide the two representatives of Alderney in the Guernsey States. |

== States election ==
2024 Alderney states election
- 16 November 2024

5 of the 10 seats in the States of Alderney
- Turnout: 63%

| Candidate | Votes | % |
|---|---|---|
| Edward Hill | 569 | 64.08 |
| Iain MacFarlane | 538 | 60.59 |
| Alex Snowdon | 520 | 58.56 |
| Stuart Clark | 498 | 56.08 |
| Kevin Gentle | 331 | 37.27 |
| Rosemary Hanbury | 315 | 35.47 |
| Haydn Bateman | 279 | 31.42 |
| Boyd Kelly | 266 | 29.95 |
| Lin Maurice | 198 | 22.30 |
| Total | 3,514 | 100.00 |
| Valid votes | 888 | 98.56 |
| Invalid/blank votes | 13 | 1.44 |
| Total votes | 901 | 100.00 |
| Registered voters/turnout | | 63 |

== President of the States ==
2024 President of the States election
- 30 November 2024
| | First party | Second party |
|---|---|---|
| Candidate | William Tate | Mark Smith |
| Party | Independent | Independent |
| Popular vote | 467 | 256 |
| Percentage | 64.59% | 35.41% |
President of the States before election
William Tate
Elected President of the States
William Tate

| Candidate | Votes | % |
|---|---|---|
| William Tate | 467 | 64.59 |
| Mark Smith | 256 | 35.41 |
| Total | 723 | 100.00 |
| Valid votes | 723 | 98.64 |
| Invalid/blank votes | 10 | 1.36 |
| Total votes | 733 | 100.00 |
| Registered voters/turnout | | 51 |

== Representatives of Alderney in the States of Guernsey ==
2024 Alderney representatives in the States of Guernsey plebiscite
- 7 December 2024

2 representatives of Alderney in the States of Guernsey

| Candidate | Votes | % |
|---|---|---|
| Edward Hill | 321 | 26.86 |
| Alex Snowdon | 317 | 26.53 |
| Stuart Clark | 260 | 21.76 |
| Iain MacFarlane | 193 | 16.15 |
| Steve Roberts | 82 | 6.86 |
| Bruce Woodhead | 22 | 1.84 |
| Total | 1,195 | 100.00 |
| Valid votes | 613 | 99.19 |
| Invalid/blank votes | 5 | 0.81 |
| Total votes | 618 | 100.00 |
| Registered voters/turnout | | 43 |
