= Tourism in Alderney =

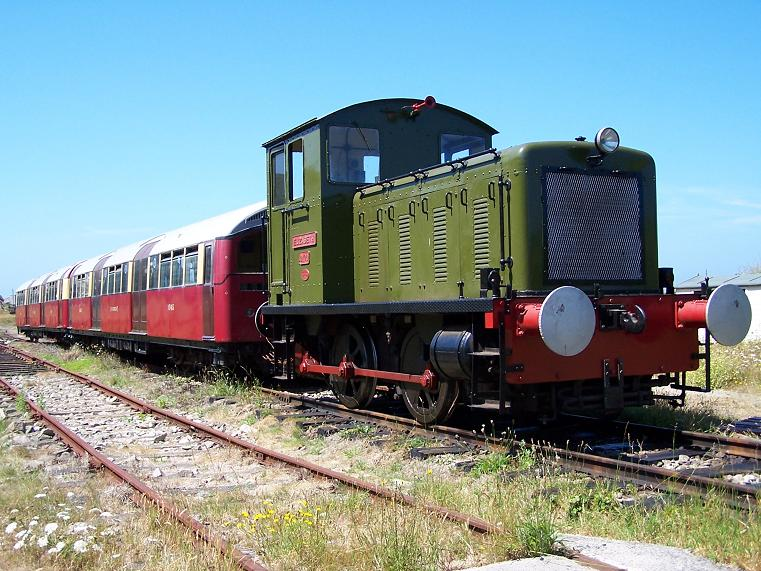
Elizabeth and London tube carriages on the Alderney Railway. Photo taken in 2007.

Tourism in Alderney is promoted by Alderney Tourism.

== Attractions ==
The island is home to the only working railway in the Channel Islands. The railway, which was opened by Queen Victoria in 1847, runs a diesel engine pulling decommissioned London Underground carriages and draws a number of railway enthusiasts from all over the world. The island is also home to the Alderney Lighthouse, constructed in 1912. Birdwatching is a popular activity among visitors to Alderney, and the island's bird hides, positioned near the Longis and Mannez ponds, attract 2,500 visitors a year. Alderney is also home to a number of beaches.

The island also has a nine-hole golf course with alternate tees. The course is said to be one of the most difficult in the Channel Islands because of the wind and a number of scenic bays.

== Statistics ==
8,099 people arrived in Alderney by commercial aircraft in September 2007. This is an increase of 16 per cent from September 2006, when the figure was 6,978. 190 private aircraft landed in Alderney in September 2007, as did 1,550 by private yacht. 604 passengers arrived in Alderney on the Manche Iles Express boat in September 2007 - although this is a decrease in passengers of 73 per cent, this was mostly due to a temporary cut in the number of sailings to the island. The Government of Alderney believed that the increase in visits to Alderney in September 2007 was due to the increased publicity given to the island on mainland United Kingdom television - shows such as The Nature of Britain and Coast had a heavy focus on the island's natural and social history.
