= QUAY-FM =

Coordinates: 49°43′24″N 2°12′1″W

QUAY-FM 107.1
- Alderney; United Kingdom
- Broadcast area: Channel Islands and surrounding waters
- Frequencies: FM: 107.1 MHz; DAB

Programming
- Format: Community radio, soft adult contemporary

Ownership
- Owner: Alderney Broadcasting Company Limited

History
- First air date: 28 July 2000
- Former frequencies: 87.7 MHz

Technical information
- ERP: 50 watts

Links
- Webcast: stream.quayfm.gg:1071/live
- Website: www.quayfm.gg

QUAY-FM is a VHF-FM broadcasting station on the island of Alderney. It holds the only community radio licence in the Channel Islands which was granted in February 2014 to the Alderney Broadcasting Company, a registered charity in Guernsey.

The scheme under which community radio stations were established in the United Kingdom by Ofcom originally did not apply to the Channel Islands, each of which has separate legal systems. Further legislation was needed in order to enable the establishment of community radio stations in the islands.

After representations from the QUAY-FM volunteers who had been operating an twice-yearly restricted service licence (RSL) and from the government of Alderney, this was enabled by the extension, by Order-in-Council of the relevant parts of the UK's Communications Act 2003 to the Bailiwick of Guernsey.

Applications were invited by Ofcom in December 2013 and closed in March the following year. This application round resulted in a licence being granted to ABC, which is incorporated in Alderney as a company limited by guarantee (company number 1899). It was the only applicant within the bailiwick, no applications having been received from either Guernsey or Sark. Its charitable status was recognised in 2023 under the Charities etc. (Guernsey and Alderney) Ordinance.

In late 2024 it was awarded a five-year licence extension by Ofcom until February 2030.

== History ==
The station was founded in the summer of 2000 by a number of volunteers, several of whom had backgrounds in BBC Radio, Independent Local Radio (ILR) in the UK, and university radio., including professional broadcasters Johnnie Fielder and Colin Mason. Presenters on the original RSL service included local hotelier Steve Collins and former University Radio Essex presenter Nigel Roberts.

The station was originally authorised to transmit on 87.7 MHz FM under a restricted service licence (RSL) issued by the then UK Radio Authority. It broadcast only for one month, during the peak summer vacation period, to cover Alderney Week. In 2004, a regular Christmas broadcast period was added.

The station equipment was kept available for possible use in times of civil emergency and was activated during the extreme weather conditions of the winter of 2010 (it was nicknamed "SNOW FM" locally, although the familiar QUAY-FM identity was used on-air).

Since early 2015, the station has broadcast year-round under a community radio licence issued by Ofcom (the successor licensing body to the Radio Authority).

Live, year-round transmissions were commenced at 7:00 a.m. on 12 February 2015 with the first transmission being made by Tim Butler, one of the original presenters of the RSL broadcasts in 2000, as presenter of the Early Morning Show. He became Station Manager in January 2023 and served in that position until his death on holiday in Egypt in March 2024

During the COVID-19 lockdown period, QUAY-FM once again became a vitally important part of the island's emergency planning measures, with President Wm Tate (President of the States of Alderney) making daily broadcasts to update islanders on the situation during the emergency powers lockdown and in the period following during which restrictions were gradually eased.

QUAY-FM started broadcasting on the Channel Island DAB+ local multiplex on 1 August 2021, and by this means DAB coverage of Sark, Guernsey and Jersey was added in addition to the FM service from Alderney. The new digital service was, shortly afterwards, complemented by a local Alderney DAB+ transmitter operated by Alderney Broadcasting on behalf of the licensee which broadcasts the whole of Channel Island multiplex to Alderney. Alderney's DAB transmissions are delivered as part of a joint project between Alderney Broadcasting and Tindle Radio.
