= Stuart Trought =

President of Alderney
- In office 22 June 2011 – 15 May 2019
- Preceded by: Norman Browse
- Succeeded by: William Tate

Personal details
- Education: Oakham School
- Occupation: Politician

Walter Stuart Trought MBE is the former President of the States of Alderney. Elected on 11 June 2011 to replace Sir Norman Browse on a turnout of 65% on 31 December 2012, he was re-elected unopposed in 2016 to serve until 31 December 2020.

On 12 April 2019, Trought announced his intention to resign after a meeting of the States in May 2019. He was replaced by William Tate on 28 June 2019.

== Biography ==
Trought was educated at Oakham School and pursued a marine career from 1967 until 1985, rising to master and superintendent. He holds a master's degree in marine transport from the University of Plymouth. He served as Director of the Group Operating Board of Lamnalco from 1985 to 2000, DGM of the Abu Dhabi Petroleum Ports Authority from 2002 to 2004, and chairman of Alderney Renewable Energy from 2006 to 2010. He has been the chairman of the Alderney branch of the RNLI since 2000, of the Alderney Maritime Trust and (as the ex-officio chairman) of the Alderney branch of The Commonwealth Parliamentary Association since 2011, and as guardian of the Alderney Foundation since 2016. He is a member of the Honourable Company of Master Mariners and the Nautical Institute. He speaks English, French and some Arabic. He was made an MBE 2020.

== President ==
As President of the States of Alderney, Trought is not directly responsible for political matters. He undertook official visits to Saint-Lô in October 2011, and to Jersey in December 2014 where a delegation from Alderney met Ian Gorst, Sir Michael Birt and Sir John McColl, and in March 2018 when he again met Gorst, as well as Sir Philip Bailhache, Lyndon Farnham and others. Additionally, he welcomed official visits from TRH Charles, Prince of Wales and Camilla, Duchess of Cornwall in July 2012, from Prince Edward, Duke of Kent in October 2018, and from various MPs and French officials. On 2 March 2017, Trought was invited to give evidence to the House of Commons Justice Select Committee on Alderney's interests after Brexit.

== Elections ==
Trought was re-elected unopposed in 2012 and 2016.

Alderney presidential election, 2011
Party	Candidate	Votes	%	±%
Independent	W Stuart Trought	487	58.6	N/A
Independent	Bill Simpson	239	28.7	N/A
Independent	Paul Arditti	105	12.6	N/A
Turnout		831	65.0	N/A
Stuart Trought gain from Norman Browse		Swing	N/A	

Political offices
Preceded by Norman Browse	President of the States of Alderney; 2011–2019	Succeeded by William Tate
