= Demographics of Alderney =

Study of human characteristics in the states of Alderney

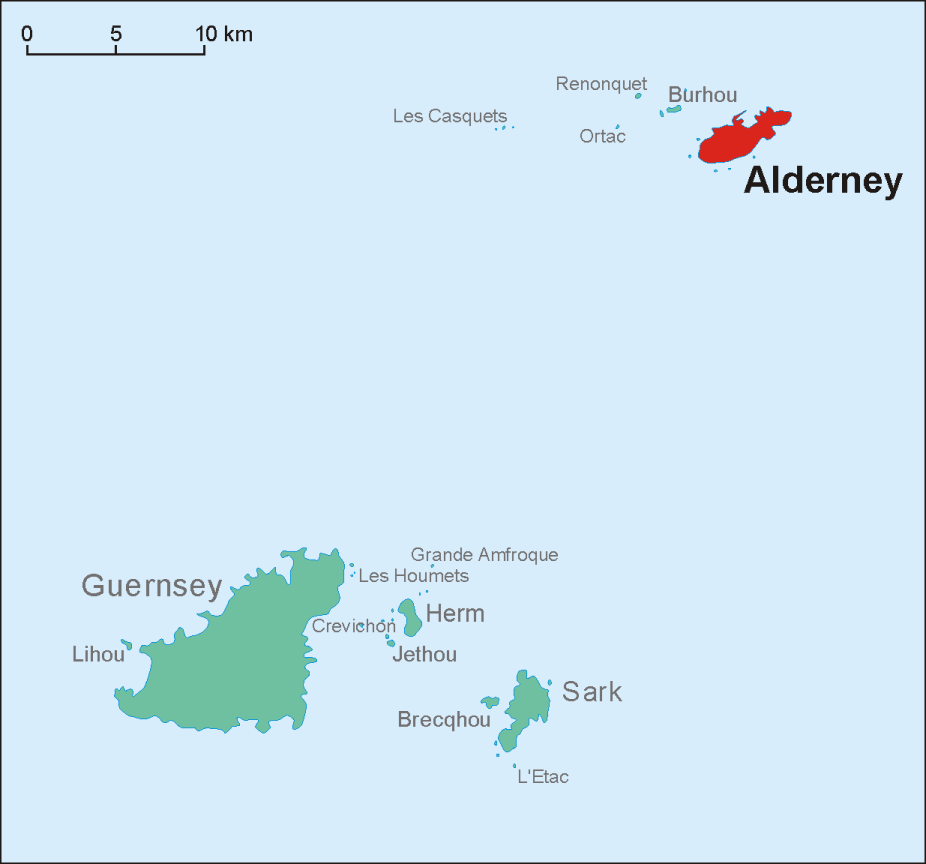
Island of Alderney

The demography of Alderney is analysed by the States of Alderney and produced in Census reports. A Census was lasted held in 2013 however more recently eCensus demographics are compiled annually using various Bailiwick of Guernsey databases.

== Population ==
As of 2017 the population of the island was estimated via the eCensus to be 1,985 with a seasonal population of over 3,000 during the summer because of tourism.

eCensus
Year	Population
2017	1,985
2016	2,000
2015	1,982
2014	1,979
2013	2,080
2013	1,903
2012	2,090
2011	2,111

Census
Year	Population
2013	1,903
2001	2,294
1991	2,297
1981	2,086
1971	1,686
1961	1,472
1951	1,328

== Gender ==
Gender disparity on the island is calculated by the Social Security Department and published in the annual eCensus report. Since 2008 Alderney has had a majority female population which has fluctuated between 50.5% and 51.4%.
