= Peter Allen (Alderney politician) =

Alderney politician

States of Alderney Member Peter Allen
- In office 1 January 2009 – 31 December 2013

States Member

Peter Allen (born 3 July 1965) is a former States of Alderney Member. He gained the highest total number of votes in the Ordinary Election on 6 December 2008, with a total of 520.

Peter Allen was born and went to school in Alderney, after doing an apprenticeship in as an electrician, and then joined the British Army and served for seven years. Whilst serving he met and married Diane, with whom he has three children. Allen is also member of the Alderney Lifeboat crew.
