= 2022 Alderney general election =

General election held in Alderney

← 2020	26 November 2022	2024 →

5 of the 10 seats in the States of Alderney
- Turnout: 0%

The 2022 Alderney general election was to have been held on 26 November 2022 to elect 5 members of the States of Alderney who will serve until 2026.

With only 4 candidates for 5 seats, the four candidates are elected unopposed to serve until 31 December 2026. One seat remains vacant.

== Results ==
Results of the 2022 Alderney general election
Party	Candidate	Votes	%
Independent	Bill Abel	n/a	0%
Independent	Steve Roberts	n/a	0%
Independent	Nigel Vooght	n/a	0%
Independent	Bruce Woodhead	n/a	0%
Total valid votes		n/a	
Rejected ballots		n/a	
Turnout		n/a	n/a

== 2023 By-election ==
On 18 February 2023 a by-election was held to fill the remaining vacant seat to serve until 31 December 2026.

Results of the 2023 Alderney general by-election
Party	Candidate	Votes	%
Independent	Derwent Smithurst	280	60.2%
Independent	Frederick George Fisher III	185	39.8%
Total valid votes		465	
Rejected ballots		5	
Turnout		470	35%
