= Norman Browse =

British surgeon (1931–2019)

Sir Norman Browse FRCS FRCP FKC

President of the States of Alderney
- In office 19 January 2002 – 22 June 2011
- Preceded by: Jon Kay-Mouat
- Succeeded by: Stuart Trought

Personal details
- Born: Norman Leslie Browse; 1 December 1931
- Died: 12 September 2019 (aged 87) Alderney, Channel Islands

Sir Norman Leslie Browse FRCS FRCP FKC (1 December 1931 – 12 September 2019) was a British surgeon and President of the States of Alderney from 2002 to 2011.

== Early life and education ==
Browse grew up in East Ham and attended East Ham Grammar School on a scholarship.

== Professional life ==
Between 1965 and 1996, Browse was Professor of Surgery and a Consultant Surgeon at St. Thomas's Hospital, London. From 1992 until 1995 he was President of the Royal College of Surgeons of England. Browse was chair of the British Atherosclerosis Discussion Group in the late 1980s; this group was the forerunner to the British Atherosclerosis Society.

Browse received a knighthood in the 1994 Birthday Honours having the honour bestowed on 20 July 1994

== President ==
Sir Norman was elected for the first time in 2002. He was re-elected unopposed in 2004 for a further four-year term. In his capacity as President, he was chair of all meetings of the States of Alderney.

== Notes and references ==
Academic offices
Preceded by Sir Terence English	President of the Royal College of Surgeons of England; 1992–1995	Succeeded by Sir Rodney Sweetnam
