= 2020 Alderney general election =

General election held in Alderney

| ← 2018 | 28 November 2020 | 2022 → |

5 of the 10 seats in the States of Alderney
- Turnout: 55%

The 2020 Alderney general election was held on 28 November 2020 to elect 5 members of the States of Alderney who will serve until 2024.

== Results ==
Results of the 2020 Alderney general election
| Party | Candidate | Votes | % |
|---|---|---|---|
| Independent | Alex Snowdon | 662 | 81.9% |
| Independent | Ian Carter | 571 | 70.7% |
| Independent | Kevin Gentle | 556 | 68.8% |
| Independent | Rhys Jenkins | 550 | 68.1% |
| Independent | Boyd Kelly | 398 | 49.3% |
| Independent | Nick Winder | 348 | 43.1% |
| Total valid votes | | 808 | |
| Rejected ballots | | 5 | |
| Turnout | | 813 | ~56% |

== 2022 By-election ==
After Rhys Jenkins resigned, a by-election was to be held on 15 October 2022. Lin Maurice was elected unopposed to serve until 2024.
