= Rodney Sweetnam =

British orthopaedic surgeon (1927–2013)

Sir Rodney Sweetnam KCVO CBE FRCS FRCP
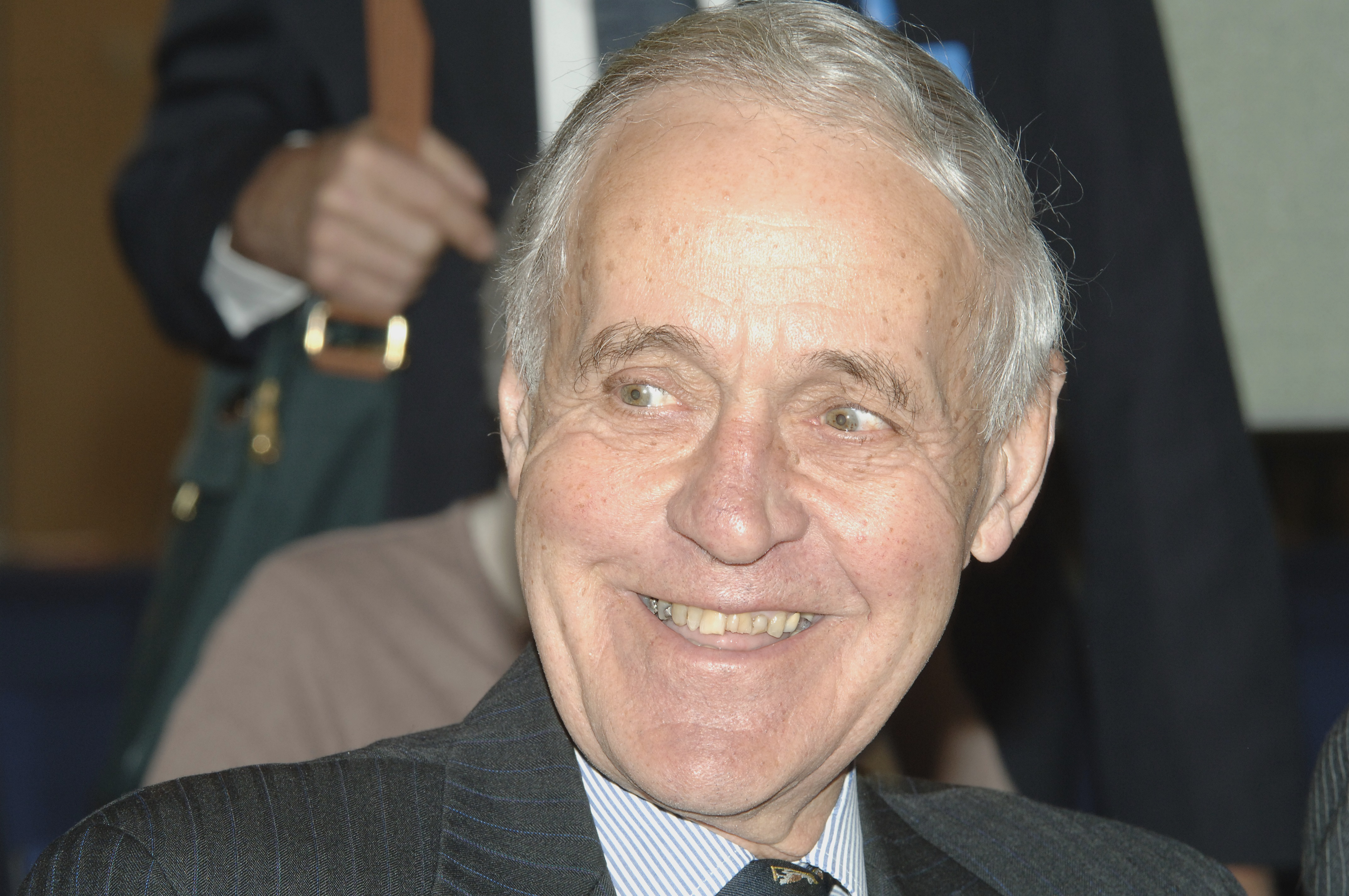
- Born: David Rodney Sweetnam; 5 February 1927; Wimbledon, London, England
- Died: 17 May 2013 (aged 86)
- Occupation: Orthopaedic surgeon

Sir David Rodney Sweetnam KCVO CBE FRCS FRCP (1927–2013), known as Rodney, was a British orthopaedic surgeon.

== Early life ==
Sweetnam was born on 5 February 1927, in Wimbledon, south London, to Irene (née Black), a former medical student, and William Sweetnam, a GP. He was educated at Clayesmore School.

== Career ==
From 1950 to 1952 he undertook National Service as a surgeon-lieutenant aboard HMS Vanguard.

From 1974 to 1992 he was consultant orthopaedic surgeon at the Middlesex Hospital and at University College Hospital, becoming emeritus upon retirement.

He was also a consultant adviser in orthopaedic surgery to the United Kingdom's Department of Health from 1981 to 1990.

He was orthopaedic surgeon to Elizabeth II (1982–92) and president of the Royal College of Surgeons (1995–98). He was also president of the British Orthopaedic Association (1985); and a Fellow of University College London.

He was made a Commander of the Order of the British Empire (CBE) in the 1990 New Year Honours and a Knight Commander of the Royal Victorian Order (KCVO) in the 1992 New Year Honours.

He died on 17 May 2013.

Academic offices
Preceded by Sir Barry Jackson	President of the Royal College of Surgeons of England; 1995–1998	Succeeded by Sir Norman Browse
Non-profit organization positions
Preceded by Dame Josephine Barnes	President of the Royal Medical Benevolent Fund; 1998–2002	Succeeded by Sir Barry Jackson
