= William Tate (Alderney politician) =

Alderney politician

President of Alderney
- Incumbent
- Assumed office 28 June 2019
- Preceded by: Stuart Trought; James Dent (Interm)

Personal details
- Occupation: Lawyer, Politician

William Tate is an Alderney politician who has been Leader of Alderney and President of the States of Alderney.

He assumed the position unopposed on 28 June 2019, after Jack Gates withdrew his candidacy on 21 June.

== Biography ==
Tate qualified as a solicitor in 1978 in Leeds, eventually establishing his own specialist legal practice. He was subsequently called to the Bar, and practiced on the North Eastern Circuit.

He was appointed as Alderney's first Land Use Plan Inspector at the inception of the new Land Use Plan process in 1999, in order to provide a framework for developing policy in relation to the use of the island's assets.

He is married to a lady named Gabrielle, a chartered accountant, and has lived in Alderney since 1996.

== President ==
Assumed position of President in 2019, unopposed, won election in 2020.

== Elections ==
Tate was elected unopposed in 2019. He won a contested election in 2020.

Alderney presidential election, 14 November 2020
Party	Candidate	Votes	%	±%
Independent	William Tate	525	68.6	N/A
Independent	Louis Jean	236	30.8	N/A
Turnout		765	53.0	N/A
William Tate hold		Swing	N/A	

Political offices
Preceded by Stuart Trought	President of the States of Alderney; 2019–present	Incumbent
