= John Le Mesurier (Alderney) =

Governor of Alderney (1781–1843)

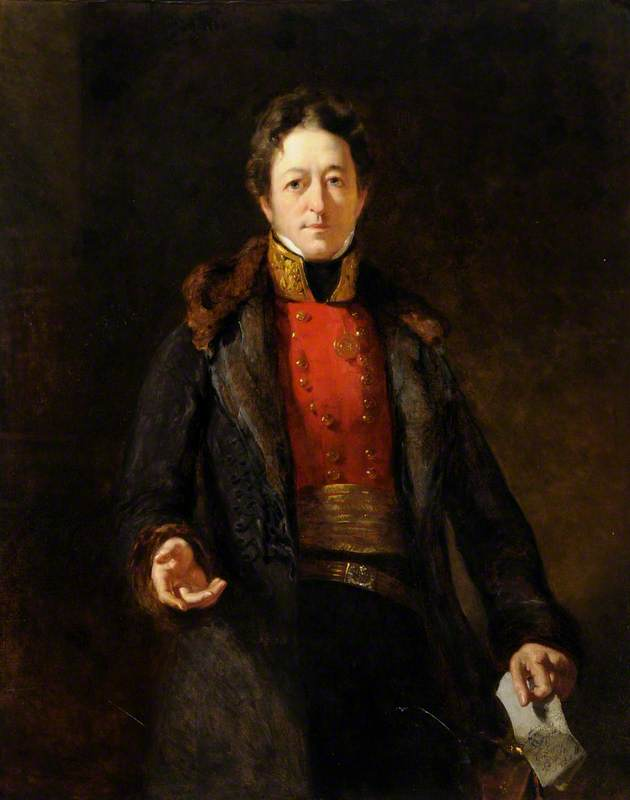
- Born: 1781
- Died: 21 May 1843 (aged 61–62)
- Parent(s): Peter le Mesurier
- Position held: Governor of Alderney

John Le Mesurier (1781–1843) was a soldier and governor of Alderney. He resigned his patent to the crown in 1825 and was the last hereditary Governor of Alderney.

== Life ==
John le Mesurier was born on 7 July 1781, the eldest son of Peter Le Mesurier, acting Governor of Alderney, and grandson of Governor John Le Mesurier, who died in 1793. Alderman Paul Le Mesurier and Commissary Havilland Le Mesurier were his uncles.

In 1794 he was appointed ensign in the 132nd Highlanders, from which short-lived corps he was promoted into the 89th Foot, and became captain-lieutenant in 1796. He served with a flank battalion commanded by Colonel Stewart in the Irish rebellion of 1798, and afterwards with his regiment in 1799–1800 at the occupation of Messina after the blockade and capture of Malta under General Thomas Graham, Lord Lynedoch. He served in the campaign in Egypt in 1801, including the battles before Alexandria, the defence of Rosetta, and the surrender of Cairo.

After the fall of Alexandria the 89th embarked on board Lord Keith's fleet on a secret expedition, the destination of which was supposed to be Brazil; but on reaching Malta peace was found to have been declared, and the regiment returned to Ireland in 1802. Later the same year he purchased his majority in the 89th. He remained in Ireland until 1805, when he was called on to assume the governorship of Alderney. This obliged him to retire on half-pay, though with the intention of returning to active service as soon as possible.

The governorship of Alderney, to which Le Mesurier succeeded on the death of his father in 1803, was originally granted to an ancestor of the family, Sir Edmund Andros, by letters patent of Charles II, and was renewed to Le Mesurier's grandfather, John Le Mesurier, by George III, for a period of ninety-nine years, in 1763.

In 1804, Le Mesurier married Martha, daughter of Alderman Peter Perchard of London, a native of Guernsey, at Bridewell Chapel, London. They had two sons:

1. Peter Perchard (1817-1834). Born in Southampton, Hampshire. Died in teenage in Tonbridge, Kent.
2. John (1818-1903). Born in St Anne, Alderney. Died in Yateley, Hampshire. He took holy orders and was the author of some devotional works.

Le Mesurier resigned the governorship of Alderney in 1825 on condition of receiving a pension of £700 per year until the expiration of the ninety-nine years grant in 1862.

In 1841, while on the half-pay list, Le Mesurier attained the rank of lieutenant-general.

John Le Mesurier died aged 62 on 21 May 1843 at Bradfield Place near Reading, Berkshire of apoplexy after a few days of illness.

== Notes and references ==
Attribution

This article incorporates text from a publication now in the public domain: "Le Mesurier, John". Dictionary of National Biography. London: Smith, Elder & Co. 1885–1900.
