= President of the States of Alderney =

President of Alderney
- Incumbent; William Tate since 28 June 2019
- Member of: States of Alderney
- Seat: States of Alderney
- Appointer: Popular vote
- Term length: No term limit (average 2 - 4 years between elections)
- Precursor: Judge of Alderney
- Formation: 1 January 1949

The President of the States of Alderney, also known as the President of Alderney, is the elected head of Alderney's legislature, the States of Alderney and the Leader of Alderney. The Presidency is the latest of a variety of political positions to govern the island. The office was established in 1949 after a new constitution establishing Alderney as a subordinate part of the Bailiwick of Guernsey.

== History ==
Before the office of President was established, the leaders of Alderney were the Judges of Alderney, who were appointed as representatives of the Crown in Alderney. During the Second World War, the majority of the population of Alderney was evacuated. In the Occupation of the Channel Islands by Nazi Germany, Alderney was used by the Nazis as a location for two concentration camps. After the Liberation, less than 50% of Alderney's population returned, leading to an urgent discussion taking part in the Parliament of the United Kingdom because land boundaries and property documents had been destroyed.

=== Since 1949 ===
In 1947, His Majesty's Privy Council decided that Guernsey might take over administration of Alderney. In 1948 the Alderney (Application of Legislation) Law was passed by both the States of Guernsey and the States of Alderney, which provided financial administration responsibility for certain public services to be assumed by the States of Guernsey. The law provided for the establishment of the office of President of Alderney to be the elected leader of Alderney in civil life under the Lieutenant-Governor of Guernsey.

The President is elected for a four-year term and is also the chairman of the States of Alderney. The President also holds the right to vote in the States of Alderney; however, this is only used to make the deciding vote in the event of a tied vote. The next election for president will be in 2028.

== Duties ==
The President's Office is responsible for the following:

- Production and issue of the Billet D'Etat, Deliberations and Hansard Reports
- Dealing with Members of the Public and other Government offices
- Official Flag Flying
- Organising civic and social events including Vin d'Honneurs and visits by dignitaries
- Honours and Awards

== List of presidents of Alderney ==
President of Alderney
Sydney Peck Herivel	1 January 1949 – 26 August 1970
George William Baron (1st time)	1970–77
Jon Kay-Mouat (1st time)	1977–94
George William Baron (2nd time)	1994–97
Jon Kay-Mouat (2nd time)	1997 – 19 January 2002
Sir Norman Browse	19 January 2002 – 22 June 2011
Stuart Trought	22 June 2011 – 15 May 2019
James Dent, Interim President	15 May 2019 – 28 June 2019
William Tate	28 June 2019 – present

== See also ==
- Leader of Alderney
