= Alderney =

Jurisdiction of the Bailiwick of Guernsey

Alderney Aoeur'gny (Norman) Aurigny (French)
- Jurisdiction of the Bailiwick of Guernsey
- Flag Coat of arms
- Anthem: "God Save the King" (Note: "God Save the King" is the national anthem by custom, not statute, and there is no authorised version. Typically only the first verse is usually sung, although the second verse is also often sung as well at state and public events. The words King, he, him, his, used at present, are replaced by Queen, she, her when the monarch is female.)
- Location of Alderney (circled) in the Bailiwick of Guernsey (red)

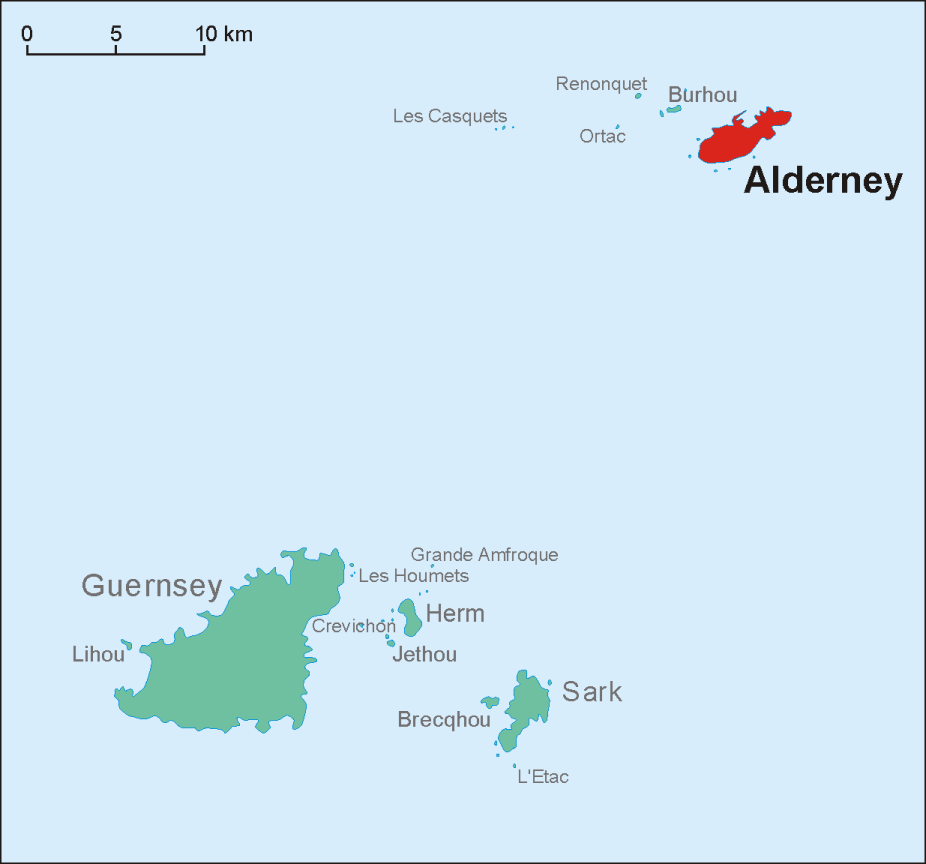
- Map of Alderney within the Bailiwick
- Sovereign state responsible for Guernsey: United Kingdom
- Dependent territory of Crown Dependency: Bailiwick of Guernsey
- Separation from the Duchy of Normandy: 1204
- Capital: Saint Anne
- Official languages: English
- Government: Self-governing dependency under a parliamentary constitutional monarchy
  - Duke: Charles III
  - President: William Tate
- Legislature: States of Alderney

Government of the United Kingdom
  - Minister: Baroness Levitt

Area
  - Total: 7.8 km^{2} (3.0 sq mi)
  - Water (%): 0
- Highest elevation: 90 m (296 ft)

Population
  - 2023 census: 2,167
  - Density: 277/km^{2} (717.4/sq mi)
- Currency: Alderney pound (Note: Commemorative coins of the Alderney pound are occasionally issued as non-circulating legal tender.); Pound sterling (£) (GBP)
- Time zone: UTC±00:00 (GMT)
  - Summer (DST): UTC+01:00 (BST)
- Date format: dd/mm/yyyy
- Driving side: Left
- Calling code: +44
- UK postcode: GY9
- ISO 3166 code: GG
- Internet TLD: .gg

Designations

Ramsar Wetland
- Official name: Alderney West Coast and the Burhou Islands
- Designated: 24 August 2005
- Reference no.: 1587

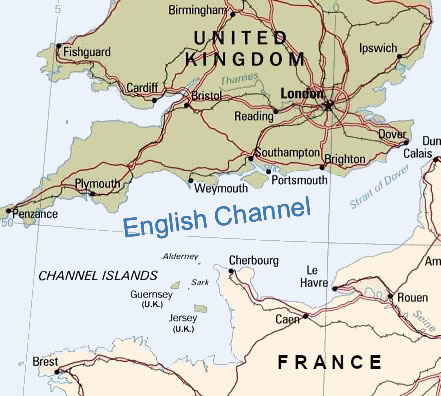
English Channel with Alderney in the middle

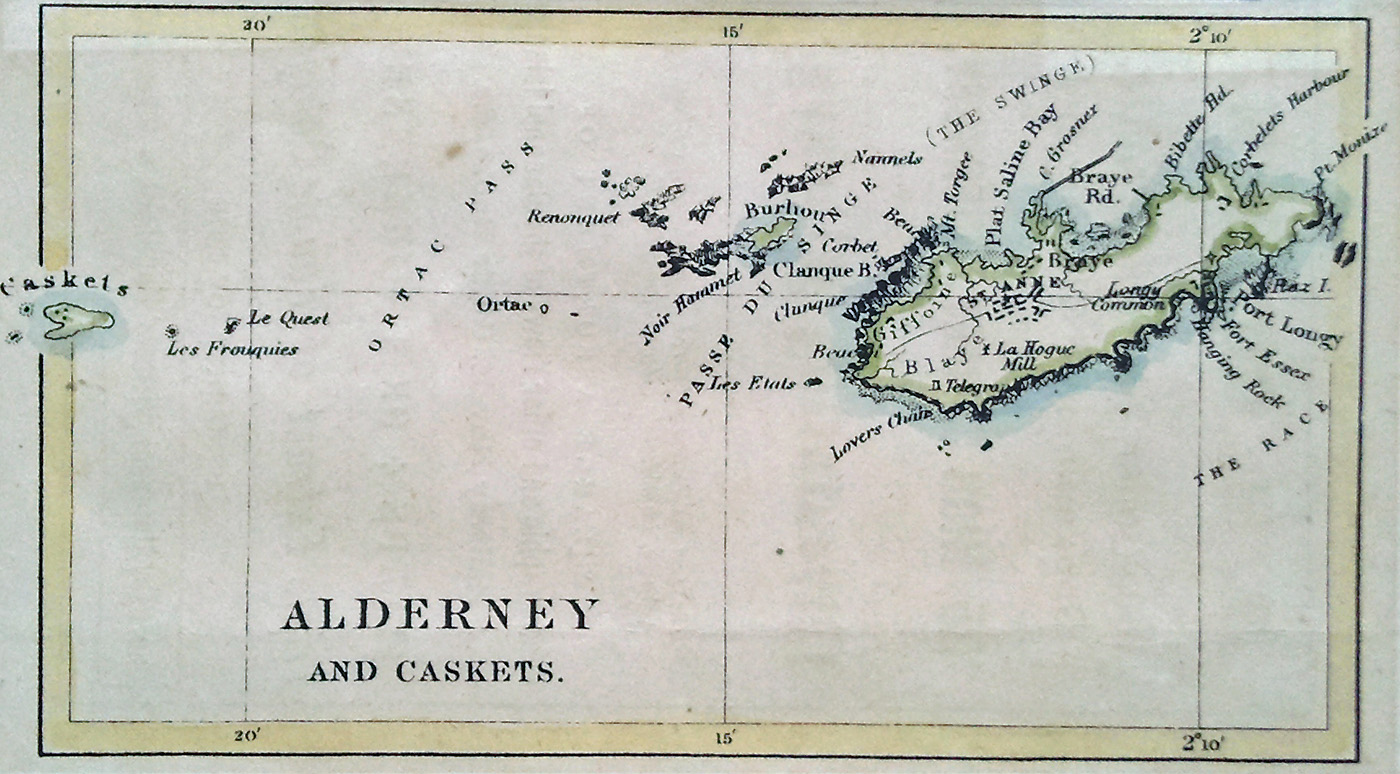
1890 map of Alderney and adjacent islands

Alderney (/ˈɔːldərni/ AWL-dər-nee; French: Aurigny [oʁiɲi]; Auregnais: Aoeur'gny) is the northernmost of the inhabited Channel Islands. It is part of the Bailiwick of Guernsey, a British Crown dependency. It is 3 miles (5 km) long and 1.5 miles (2.4 km) wide.

Alderney has an area of 3 square miles (8 km^{2}), making it the third-largest island of the Channel Islands, and the second-largest in the bailiwick only to the island of Guernsey itself. Alderney is around 10 miles (16 km) to the west of the Cap de la Hague on the Cotentin Peninsula, Normandy, in France, 20 miles (32 km) to the northeast of Guernsey and 60 miles (100 km) from the south coast of Great Britain. It is the closest of the Channel Islands both to France and to the United Kingdom. It is separated from the Cap de la Hague by the dangerous Alderney Race (French: Raz Blanchard).

As of March 2023, the island had a population of 2,167; natives are traditionally nicknamed vaques after the cows, or else lapins after the many rabbits seen in the island. Formally, they are known as Ridunians, from the Latin Riduna.

The only parish of Alderney is the parish of St Anne, which covers the whole island.

The main town, Saint Anne, historically known as La Ville ('The Town'), is often referred to as St Anne's by visitors and incomers, but rarely by locals (who, in normal conversation, still most frequently refer to the area centred on Victoria Street simply as Town). The town's "High Street", which formerly had a small handful of shops, is now almost entirely residential, forming a T-junction with Victoria Street at its highest point.

The town area features an imposing church and an unevenly cobbled main street: Victoria Street (Rue Grosnez, the English name being adopted on the visit of Queen Victoria in 1854). There is one school (providing both primary and secondary education), a post office, hotels, restaurants, shops, and a bank. Other settlements include: Braye, Crabby, Longis, Mannez, La Banque, and Newtown.

== History ==
Alderney shares its prehistory with the other islands in the Bailiwick of Guernsey; it became an island in the Neolithic period as the waters of the English Channel rose. Formerly rich in dolmens, like the other Channel Islands, Alderney with its heritage of megaliths has suffered through the large-scale military constructions of the 19th century and also by the Germans during the World War II occupation, who left the remains at Les Pourciaux unrecognisable as dolmens. A cist survives near Fort Tourgis, and Longis Common has remains of an Iron Age site. There are traces of Roman occupation including a fort, built in the late 300s, at 49°43′09″N 2°10′36″W above the island's only natural harbour.

The etymology of the island's name is obscure. It is known in Latin as Riduna but, as with the names of all the Channel Islands in the Roman period, there is a degree of confusion. Riduna may be the original name of Tatihou, while Alderney is conjectured to be identified with Sarnia. Alderney/Aurigny is variously supposed to be a Germanic or Celtic name. It may be a corruption of Adreni or Alrene, which is probably derived from an Old Norse word meaning "island near the coast".

Alternatively, it may derive from three Norse elements: alda (swelling wave, roller), renna (strong current, race) and öy or -ey (island). Alderney may be mentioned in Paul the Deacon's Historia Langobardorum (I.6) as 'Evodia' in which he discussed a certain dangerous whirlpool. The name 'Evodia' may in turn originate from the seven 'Haemodae' of uncertain identification in Pliny the Elder's Natural History (IV 16 (30) or Pomponius Mela's Chronographia (III 6,54).

Along with the other Channel Islands, Alderney was annexed by the Duchy of Normandy in 933. In 1042, William the Bastard, Duke of Normandy (later William the Conqueror, King of the English), granted Alderney to the Abbey of Mont Saint-Michel. In 1057, the Bishop of Coutances took back control of the island.

After 1204, when mainland Normandy was incorporated into the Kingdom of France, Alderney remained loyal to the English monarch in his dignity of Duke of Normandy.

Henry VIII of England undertook fortification works, but these ceased in 1554. Essex Castle perpetuates the name of the Earl of Essex, who purchased the governorship of Alderney in 1591. Prior to the Earl's execution for treason in 1601, he leased the island to William Chamberlain, and Alderney remained in the hands of the Chamberlain family until 1643. From 1612, a Judge was appointed to assist the Governor's administration of Alderney, along with the Jurats. The function of the Judge was similar to that of the Bailiffs of Guernsey and Jersey, and continued until 1949.

During the Wars of the Three Kingdoms, Alderney was held by a Parliamentary garrison under Nicholas Ling, Lieutenant-Governor. Ling built Government House (now the Island Hall). The de Carterets of Jersey acquired the governorship, later passing it to Sir Edmund Andros of Guernsey, from whom the Guernsey family of Le Mesurier inherited it, thus establishing a hereditary line of governors that lasted until 1825.

Henry Le Mesurier prospered through privateering, and moved the harbour from Longis to Braye, building a jetty there in 1736. Warehouses and dwellings were built at Braye, and the export of cattle generated wealth for the economy. The Court House was built in 1770 and a school in 1790. A Methodist chapel was constructed in 1790, following John Wesley's visit in 1787. An optical telegraph tower was constructed above La Foulère in 1811, enabling signals to be relayed visually to Le Mât in Sark and on to Guernsey – early warning of attack during the Napoleonic Wars was of strategic importance. With the end of those wars privateering was ended and smuggling suppressed, leading to economic difficulties.

The last of the hereditary Governors, John Le Mesurier, resigned his patent to the Crown in 1825, and since then authority has been exercised by the States of Alderney, as amended by the constitutional settlement of 1948.

=== Victorian era ===
The British Government decided to undertake massive fortifications in the 19th century and to create a strategic harbour to deter attacks from France. These fortifications were presciently described by William Ewart Gladstone as "a monument of human folly, useless to us ... but perhaps not absolutely useless to a possible enemy, with whom we may at some period have to deal and who may possibly be able to extract some profit in the way of shelter and accommodation from the ruins." An influx of English and Irish labourers, plus the sizeable British garrison stationed in the island, led to rapid Anglicisation. The harbour was never completed – the remaining breakwater (designed by James Walker) is one of the island's landmarks, and is longer than any breakwater in the UK.

Queen Victoria and Prince Albert visited Alderney on 9 August 1854. The Albert Memorial and the renaming of Rue Grosnez to Victoria Street commemorate this visit.

At the same time as the breakwater was being built in the 1850s, the island was fortified by a string of 13 forts, designed to protect the harbour of refuge. The accommodation quarters of several of the forts have been converted into apartments; two are now private homes; and one, Fort Clonque, at the end of a causeway that can be flooded at high tide, belongs to the Landmark Trust and can be rented for holidays. Scenes from the film Seagulls Over Sorrento were shot at Fort Clonque in 1953.

Some of the forts are now in varying stages of dereliction, the most ruined being Les Hommeaux Florains, perched on outlying rocks, its access causeway and bridge having been swept away long ago. Houmet Herbé resembles a Crusader castle with its squat round towers. Like many of the forts, it included such apparently anachronistic features as a drawbridge and machicolation, which were still common in military architecture of the period.

=== Second World War ===
In June 1940, almost the entire population of Alderney of 1,400 was evacuated to Britain. Most went on the official evacuation boats sent from mainland Britain. Some, however, decided to make their own way, mostly via Guernsey, but due to the impending occupation many found themselves unable to leave and were forced to stay on Guernsey for the duration of the war. Eighteen Alderney people elected not to leave with the general evacuation. However, boats from Guernsey came and collected some of them before the German Army arrived, on the basis that it was best for their personal safety. During the Second World War, the Channel Islands were the only part of the British Isles that was occupied by Germany, although other parts of the Empire were occupied by the Axis powers.

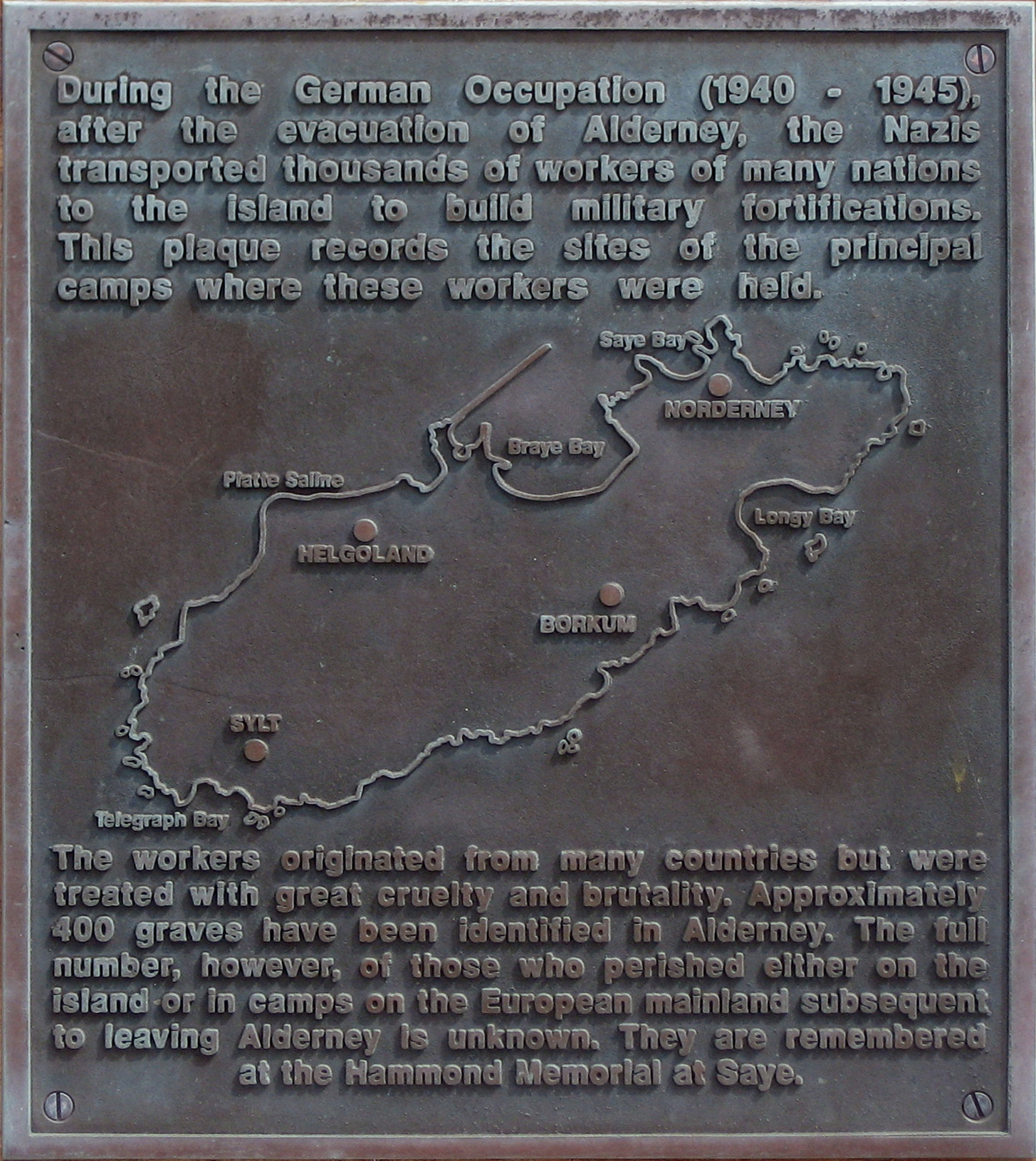
Alderney camps memorial plaque

The Germans arrived to a nearly deserted island, and began to follow their orders to fortify Alderney as part of Hitler's Atlantic Wall. In January 1942, they built four camps in Alderney: two work camps, Lager Helgoland and Lager Borkum, and two concentration camps, Lager Sylt and Lager Norderney. The jail behind the main police station was used by the Nazis as a prison.

The camps were built by the Nazi Organisation Todt (OT) to house the labour used to build fortifications including bunkers, gun emplacements, tunnels, air-raid shelters and other concrete and field fortifications. Lager Norderney, containing Russian and Polish POWs, and the Lager Sylt camp holding Jewish slave labourers, were transferred to SS administration in March 1943 under the control of Hauptsturmführer Maximilian List. There are 397 graves in Alderney, which when added to the men who died in ships, takes the total to over 700 out of a total inmate population of 6,000 who died before the camps were closed and the remaining inmates transferred to France in 1944.

On the return to their island, Alderney evacuees had little or no knowledge of the crimes committed on their island during the occupation, because by December 1945, the first date civilians could return home, all the slave labourers had been sent away and the majority of the German troops left behind were not senior staff. Evidence, however, was all over the island, with concrete fortifications and graveyards for the prisoners kept there during the occupation.

The Royal Navy blockaded the islands from time to time, particularly following the liberation of Normandy in 1944. Intense negotiations resulted in some Red Cross humanitarian aid, but there was considerable hunger and privation during the five years of German occupation, particularly in the final months when the Germans themselves were close to starvation. The Germans surrendered Alderney on 16 May 1945, eight days after the Allies formally accepted the unconditional surrender of the armed forces of Nazi Germany and the end of World War II in Europe, and seven days after the liberation of Guernsey and Jersey. 2,332 German prisoners of war were removed from Alderney on 20 May 1945, leaving 500 Germans to undertake clearing up operations under British military supervision.

The people of Alderney could not start returning until December 1945 due to the huge cleanup operation needed simply to make the island safe for civilians. When the islanders returned home they were shocked to see the state of the island, with many houses completely derelict: the Germans had burned anything wooden, including front doors, for fuel. Archival and object evidence of the general evacuation in 1940 and the subsequent occupation of Alderney can be found in the Alderney Society Museum.

In 1949, two former SS officials from the Lager Norderney concentration camp, SS Obersturmführer Adam Adler and Lagerführer Heinrich Evers, were prosecuted in France for crimes committed during their administration of the camp. Adler was sentenced to ten years, while Evers received a seven-year sentence. Members of the Association des Anciens Déportés d'Aurigny considered the sentences overly lenient. A 1945 British military report, known as the Pantcheff Report, documented that eight French nationals had perished in the Alderney camps.

In May 2024, an investigative commission led by Lord Pickles concluded that between 641 and 1,027 individuals likely died in the Nazi camps on Alderney. The report highlighted the atrocious conditions faced by forced labourers, who endured starvation, dangerously long hours, hazardous construction tasks, frequent abuse, torture, inadequate housing, and, in some cases, execution.

A series of tunnels also remain in place on Alderney, constructed by forced labour. These are in varying degrees of decay, being left open to the public and the elements.

=== Since 1945 ===
For two years after the end of the war, Alderney was operated as a communal farm. Craftsmen were paid by their employers, while others were paid by the local government out of the profit from the sales of farm produce. Remaining profits were put aside to repay the British Government for repairing and rebuilding the island. The local people resented being unable to control their own land; this led to the United Kingdom Home Office setting up an enquiry that led to the "Government of Alderney Law 1948", which came into force on 1 January 1949. The law organised the construction and election of the States of Alderney and the justice system; and, for the first time in Alderney, the imposition of taxes. The legislature and judiciary were separated. The position of Judge, who had headed the island's government since the resignation of the last Governor in 1825, was abolished, and the Jurats were removed from their legislative function.

Because of the island's small population, it was believed that the island could not be self-sufficient in running the airport and the harbour, or providing services that would match those of the UK. Taxes were therefore collected into the general Bailiwick of Guernsey revenue funds at the same rate as in Guernsey, and administered by the States of Guernsey. Guernsey became responsible for providing many government functions and services.

The 20th century saw much change in Alderney, from the building of the airport in the late 1930s to the death of the last speakers of the island's Auregnais language, a dialect of the Norman language. The economy has gone from depending largely on agriculture to earning money from the tourism and finance industries. E-commerce has become increasingly important, and the island hosts the domain name registry for both Bailiwicks and dozens of gambling website operators. Alderney has a full regulatory authority in operation.

== Politics ==
The States of Alderney (French: États d'Aurigny) is the legislature of the island; it sends two representatives to the States of Guernsey as well. The origin of the States is unknown, but it has operated from the Middle Ages.

The States of Alderney consists of the President, directly elected every four years, and ten States Members, half elected every two years for a four-year mandate. The whole island is a single constituency. William Tate was elected president in June 2019.

While Alderney enjoys full autonomy in law (except in matters of foreign affairs and defence, like the other Channel Islands and the Isle of Man), under the provisions of a formal agreement (known as "the 1948 Agreement") entered into between the Governments of Alderney and of Guernsey, certain matters have been delegated to Guernsey. These are known as 'the transferred services'.

Transferred services include policing, customs and excise, airport operations, health, education, social services, childcare and adoption. (The States of Alderney retains policy control of aviation to and from the island). In return for providing the transferred services Guernsey levies various taxes and duties on Alderney.

Immigration is the responsibility of the UK (UK law applies), with day-to-day operations carried out by the Guernsey Border Agency. In addition to the transferred services, both the UK and Guernsey may legislate on other matters with the consent of the States of Alderney.

== Law ==
=== Legal system ===
The Court of Alderney exercises unlimited original jurisdiction in civil matters and limited jurisdiction in criminal matters. The Court sits with a Chairman (the Judge of Alderney) and at least three of the six Jurats. Appeals are made to the Royal Court of Guernsey, which also exercises some original jurisdiction in criminal matters in Alderney, and thence to the Judicial Committee of the Privy Council.

=== Taxation ===
For a number of taxation purposes, Alderney is treated as if it were part of Guernsey. Income Tax is administered by the Guernsey Revenue Service but there are some differences between Alderney and Guernsey Income Tax, specifically in the matter of the cap on Income Tax (which is set lower in Alderney than in Guernsey).

From 2016, Alderney took back control of Tax on Real Property (TRP). From 2021, Alderney is responsible for setting the rate and collecting the Taxation on Real Property (TRP), with Occupier's Rates (OR) now included within that bill. Alderney now also receives Motor Fuel Excise Duty and Document Duty on property conveyances.

== Climate ==
The climate of Alderney is temperate, moderated by the sea, and summers are usually warmer than elsewhere in the British Isles.

Under the Köppen climate classification, Alderney has an oceanic climate (Cfb), similar to a warm-summer Mediterranean climate (Csb). Alderney has cool, wet winters and mild summers with moderate rainfall. February is the coldest month with an average high of 8 °C (47 °F), and a low of 4 °C (40 °F). July and August are the warmest months, with an average high of 19 °C (66 °F), and a low of 13 to 14 °C (around 56 °F). October is the wettest month with 107.2 mm (4.22 in) of rain, and April is the driest month with 42.4 mm (1.67 in). Snow is very rare. Average annual sunshine hours are around 1780.

Climate data for Alderney Airport (ACI) (1981-2010 averages)
Month	Jan	Feb	Mar	Apr	May	Jun	Jul	Aug	Sep	Oct	Nov	Dec	Year
Mean daily maximum °C (°F)	8.6 (47.5)	8.4 (47.1)	9.7 (49.5)	11.3 (52.3)	14.2 (57.6)	16.5 (61.7)	18.7 (65.7)	18.9 (66.0)	17.7 (63.9)	15.0 (59.0)	11.8 (53.2)	9.5 (49.1)	13.4 (56.1)
Daily mean °C (°F)	6.8 (44.2)	6.4 (43.5)	7.7 (45.9)	8.8 (47.8)	11.6 (52.9)	13.7 (56.7)	16.0 (60.8)	16.4 (61.5)	15.4 (59.7)	12.9 (55.2)	10.0 (50.0)	7.6 (45.7)	11.1 (52.0)
Mean daily minimum °C (°F)	4.9 (40.8)	4.3 (39.7)	5.6 (42.1)	6.3 (43.3)	8.9 (48.0)	10.9 (51.6)	13.2 (55.8)	13.9 (57.0)	13.1 (55.6)	10.8 (51.4)	8.1 (46.6)	5.6 (42.1)	8.8 (47.8)
Average precipitation mm (inches)	80.8 (3.18)	57.3 (2.26)	54.5 (2.15)	42.4 (1.67)	42.9 (1.69)	45.2 (1.78)	47.5 (1.87)	44.5 (1.75)	55.0 (2.17)	107.2 (4.22)	104.2 (4.10)	81.3 (3.20)	762.8 (30.03)
Average precipitation days (≥ 1.0 mm)	13.8	11.1	11.7	9.1	7.9	7.9	7.0	7.2	8.4	12.1	15.2	13.7	125.2
Mean monthly sunshine hours	58.1	80.8	125.8	186.2	220.8	231.2	236.5	219.9	171.6	120.8	77.8	53.6	1,782.9
Source: Met Office

== Geography and natural history ==
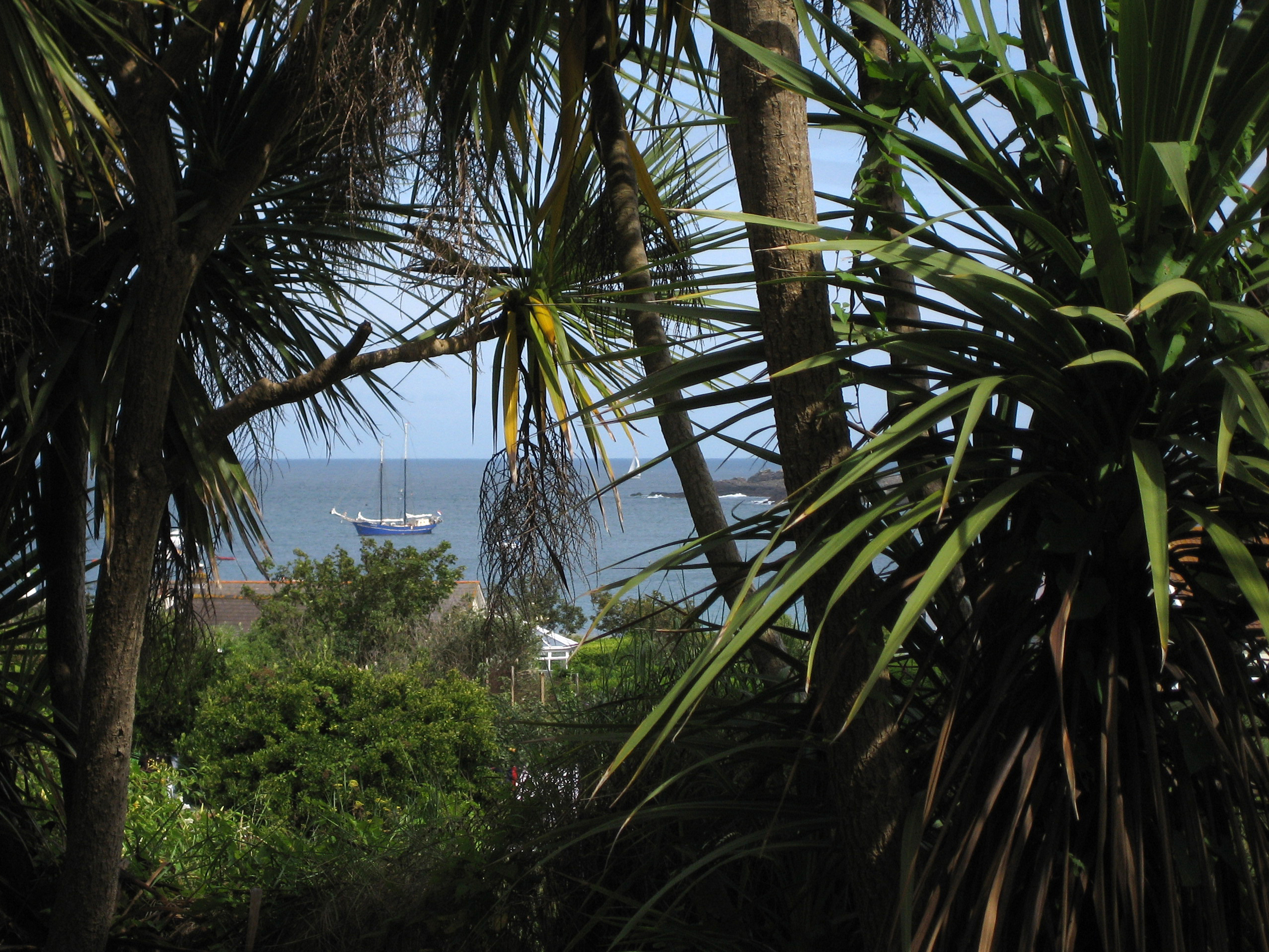
Vegetation of Alderney (cabbage trees)

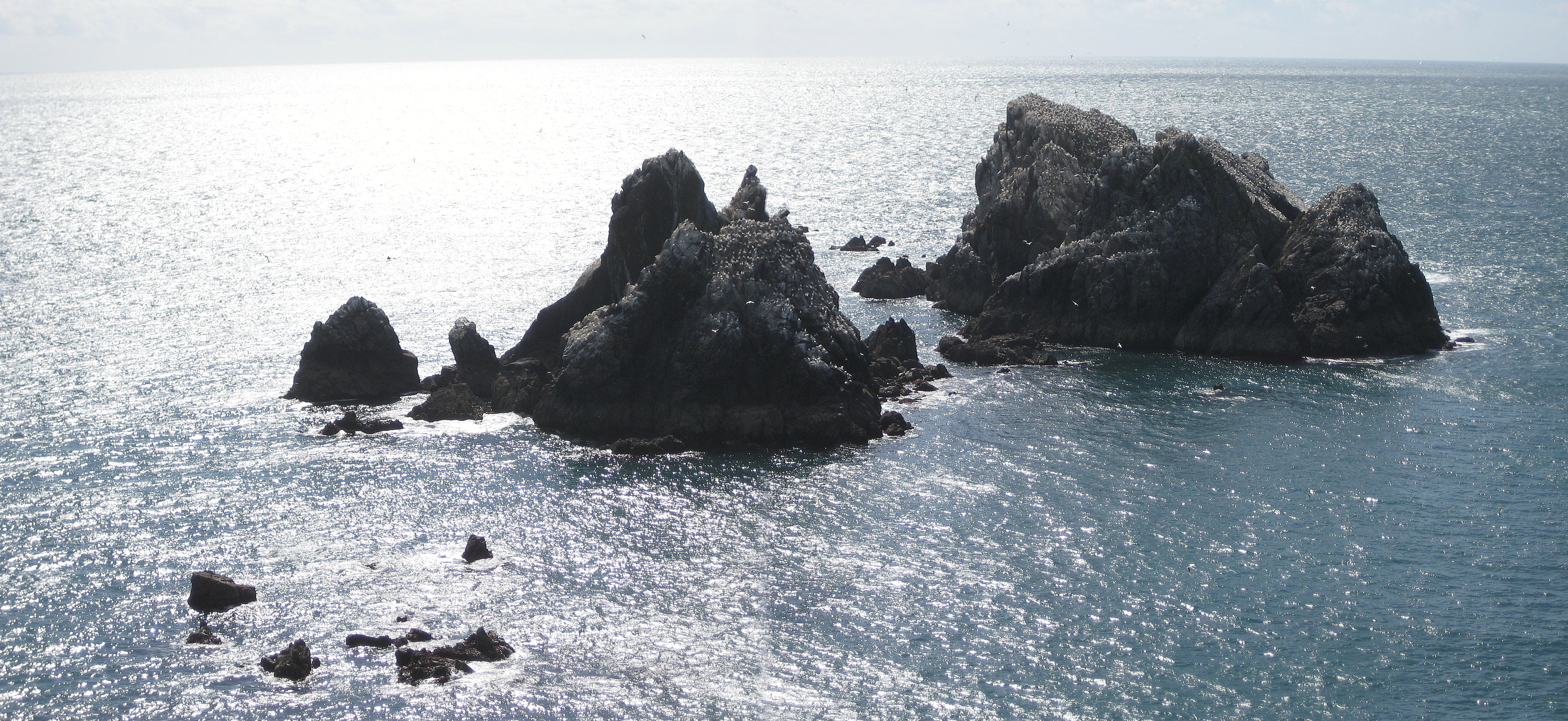
Les Étacs – gannet colony

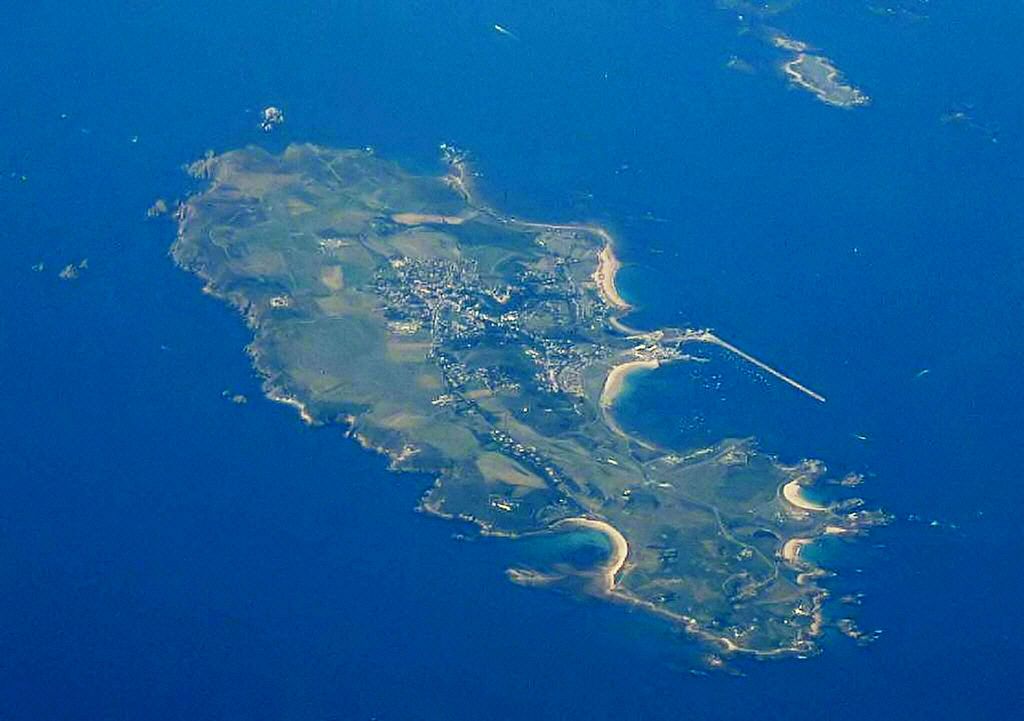
Alderney (centre) and Burhou (upper right)

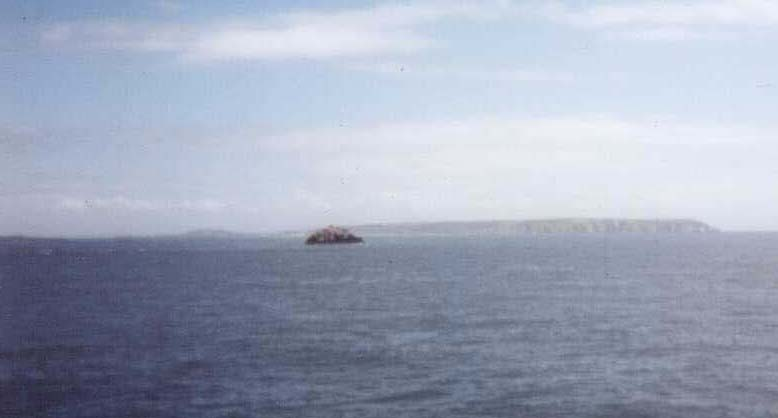
Ortac in the distance, seen from the ferry. Alderney is in the background.

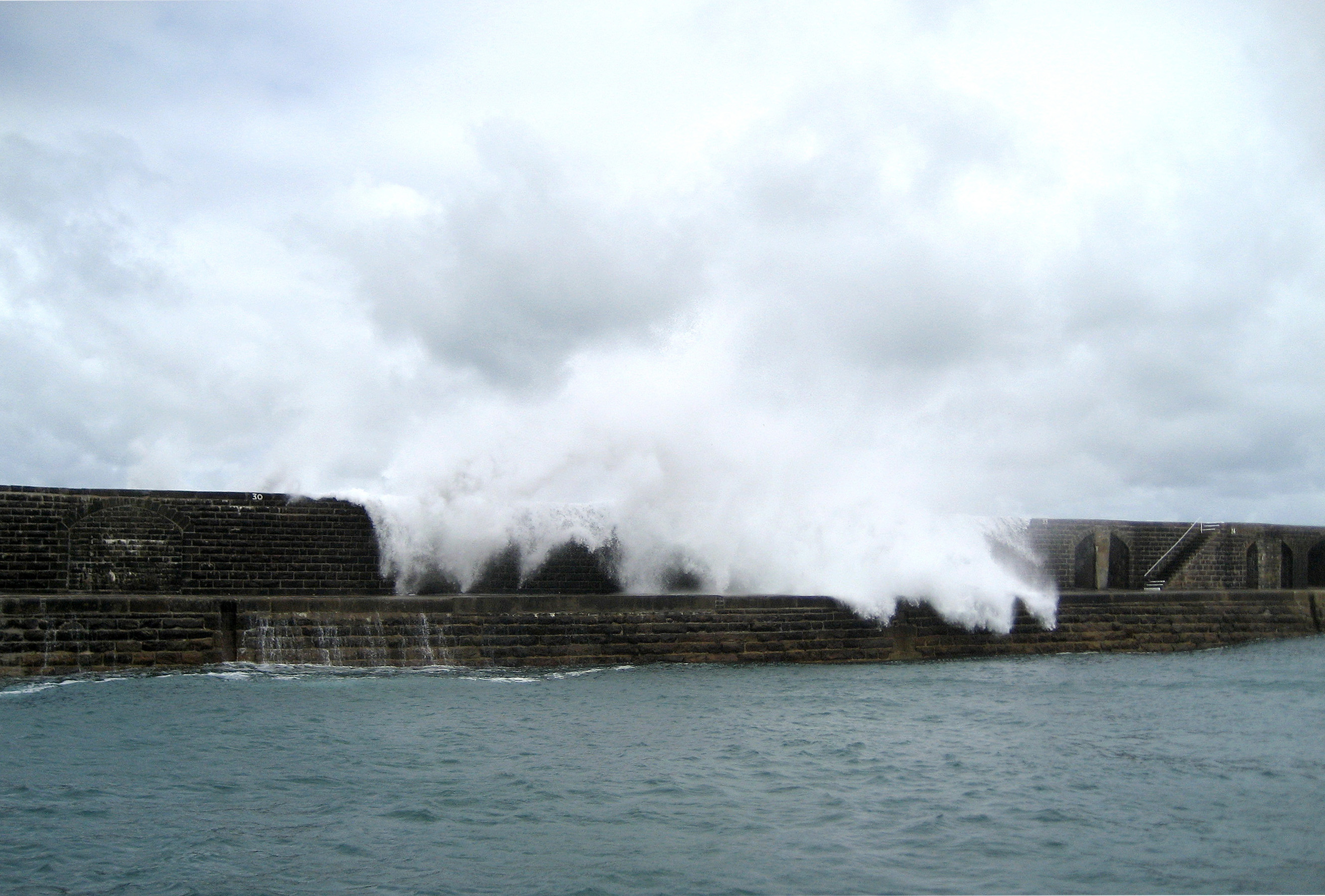
Breakwater of Alderney, Braye Harbour

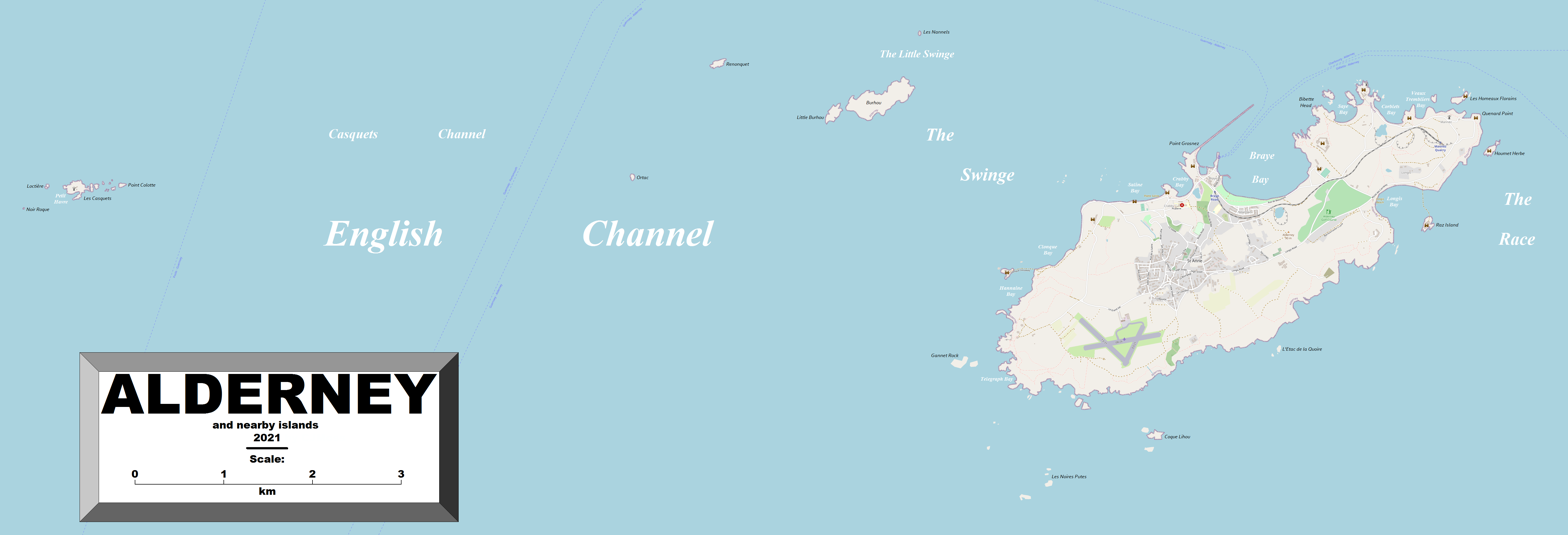
Enlargeable, detailed map of Alderney and associated islands

Alderney is similar to the other Channel Islands in having sheer cliffs broken by stretches of sandy beach and dunes. The highest point is on the central plateau of the island at 296 feet (90 metres).

Alderney and its surrounding islets support a rich flora and fauna. Trees are rather scarce, as many were cut down in the 17th century to fuel the lighthouses on Alderney and the Casquets. Those trees that remain include cabbage trees (due to the mild climate – often miscalled "palms" but of the asparagus family), and there are some small woods dotted about the island. Puffins on Burhou and gannet on Les Étacs (popularly called Gannet Rock) just off Alderney are a favourite of many visitors to the island.

About a quarter of Alderney hedgehogs are of the "white" or "blonde" variety, which does not carry fleas. These are not albinos, but descent of rarely met blonde European hedgehogs, with a blonde pair released on the island in the 1960s. The island had its own breed of cattle, called the Alderney. The pure breed became extinct in 1944, but hybrids remain elsewhere, though no longer on Alderney. In August 2005, the west coast of Alderney and associated islands, including Burhou and Ortac, were designated as Ramsar wetlands of international importance. The Alderney Wildlife Trust helps to manage the two nature reserves, at Longis and Vau du Saou.

The island is surrounded by rocks, which have caused hundreds of wrecks. There are treacherous tidal streams on either side of the island: the Swinge between Alderney and Burhou, just outside the harbour, and Le Raz between the island and the Normandy mainland. The Corbet Rock lies in the Swinge.

The geology of Alderney is mostly granites from the Precambrian period.

== Language ==
The language of the island is now English with a few minor variants, comprising a form of Channel Island English.

For centuries the island had its own dialect of the Norman language called Auregnais, now extinct. It was primarily a spoken language, with only a few known poems and written works using it.

French was once widely used on the island, and increasingly replaced Auregnais from the late 19th century onward, but it ceased to be an official language there in 1966. French declined partly because of the many English and Irish workers in the island from 1850 onwards, building fortifications and providing the garrison soldiers; English prevailed in part due to its use as the medium of education, but also because most of the population was evacuated to the United Kingdom during the Second World War.

However, there is a strong cultural legacy of both languages in the island: most of the local place-names are in French or Auregnais, as are many local surnames. The pronunciation of various local names is also dialectal, e.g. Dupont as "dip-oh" rather than in the traditional Parisian fashion, and Saye (the name of a beach on the island) as "soy". One or two French/Auregnais words are still in common use, e.g. vraic (seaweed fertiliser), as well as impôt, which is the word used for the island's landfill.

== Culture ==
=== Sport ===
Island sports include golf, fishing and water sports, supported by clubs and associations. Alderney competes in the biennial Island Games. Athletes from Alderney have also competed at the Commonwealth Games as part of the Guernsey team. Every September, the Alderney Air Races attract a number of aircraft to compete in the deciding and final round for the European Air Racing championship, organised by the Royal Aero Club. This involves high-speed circuits round the airfield, lighthouse, Casquets and then back around. The Alderney football team plays in the annual Muratti Vase alongside teams from fellow Channel Islands, Guernsey and Jersey. Since the competition started in 1905, Alderney's sole championship victory was in 1920.

=== Pubs ===
Partly because of the tourist industry, but mainly to the Ridunians' own drinking culture (there is a common expression elsewhere in the Channel Islands that Alderney is composed of 'two thousand alcoholics, clinging to a rock'), there are many restaurants and public houses.

The States of Alderney passed pub anti-smoking legislation recently in comparison to the rest of the British Isles. Following the President's casting vote on 13 January 2010, the legislation came into force at 4 am on 1 June 2010 with Guernsey, Jersey, the UK, and the Isle of Man all having outlawed this at a previous stage.

The island has an ageing population. Notable residents of Alderney include authors T. H. White (The Once and Future King) and Elisabeth Beresford (The Wombles), cricket commentator John Arlott, cricketer Sir Ian Botham, Beatles producer Sir George Martin, actress Dame Julie Andrews, and Olympic swimmer Duncan Goodhew.

=== Media ===
Local TV coverage is provided by BBC Channel Islands and ITV Channel Television. Television signals are received from the island's relay transmitter situated in the eastern part of Alderney.

The island is also served by both BBC Radio Guernsey on 99 FM and Island FM on 93.7 FM which both broadcast from St. Peter Port. Alderney has its own radio station, QUAY-FM, which broadcasts on 107.1 and online. Initially it only operated at seasonal highpoints such as the summer Alderney Week festival, but from 2015 it has broadcast 24 hours a day.

=== Alderney Week ===
Alderney Week is the island's annual summer festival, beginning the first Monday of August and lasting six days, it involves islanders and attracts visitors.

=== Miss Alderney ===
Miss Alderney is chosen during the Easter Holiday weekend each year at a public event held at the Island Hall. Application to the event is online, with the winner chosen by a panel of judges made up by non-residents and holidaymakers

=== Comedy Rocks ===
Comedy Rocks is an annual run of live stand up comedy gigs mid to late July and early August. The shows feature well known and established comedians from the UK comedy circuit, and have so far featured BBC Radio 4's Marcus Brigstocke, Zoe Lyons and I'm a Celebrity...Get Me Out of Here! runner-up Joel Dommett.

=== Alderney Annual Motor Sprint and Hill Climb ===
Every year in mid-September Alderney hosts a motorsport weekend that is organized by the Guernsey Kart and Motor Club. The event has been held for more than 20 years. The event attracts Guernsey drivers who come to Alderney with high powered cars, motorbikes, sidecars and karts.

Race vehicles are shipped to Alderney two days before the event. On the Friday, a sprint is held on the public roads of Fort Corbelets in the east of the island which are closed for the event. The following day a hill climb is held at Fort Tourgis in the west of the island and on a public road which is closed for the event. Spectators travel from Guernsey. Local Alderney people watch as the closed roads have vehicles racing at high speed where normally speed limits of 35 miles per hour (56 kilometres per hour) apply.

=== Alderney Performing Arts Festival ===
The annual Alderney Performing Arts Festival began in 2013, and features music, dance and theatre.

=== Alderney Literary Festival ===
The Alderney Literary Festival began in March 2015, with talks and events relating to historical fiction and non-fiction. It is organised by the Alderney Literary Trust.

=== Alderney Stones ===
In April 2011, sculptor Andy Goldsworthy completed a project called Alderney Stones, commenced in 2008, in which 11 large dried-earth spheres were placed at different sites on the island. The intention is that each stone will gradually erode, at different speeds depending on the location, and in some cases revealing objects buried inside. Materials included clay, earth, chain, old work gloves, bricks, hawser, wheat, wire, blackberries, poppy seeds and tools. Goldsworthy has stated that he selected Alderney as "It seems to have a strong sense of layered past and a wide variety of locations in a small area."

== Education ==
The sole school building is the St. Anne's School in Newtown. It serves ages 4–16.

Previously there was a school called Ormer House Preparatory School which closed in December 2013.

== Transport ==
Alderney is served by Alderney Airport. There are several flights each day from Southampton and Guernsey, with links to many parts of the United Kingdom and Europe. Aurigny serves the island with Twin Otters

Boats sail regularly between the island and France, and to the other Channel Islands. Manche Iles Express operates a high-speed passenger ferry in summer to Diélette in the commune of Flamanville, Manche in France, and to St Peter Port, Guernsey. Two boats offer seasonal service to Guernsey. A 12-passenger boat operates services to Cherbourg Harbour, Sark and St Peter Port. Alderney is 72.5 miles (116.7 kilometres) from St Malo and 70.3 miles (113.1 kilometres) from Poole.

There are boat trips, water-taxi services and water and fuel access to visiting yacht crews. The busiest time is during the peak months of June, July and August as nearly 30,000 yacht crew members visit this harbour every year.

Because of the island's size, vehicular transport is often unnecessary, although taxis, cars and bicycles are used. The Alderney Railway is the only remaining railway in the Channel Islands; it gives a timetabled public service, with scheduled trains to the lighthouse during the summer and special occasions such as Easter and Christmas.

Alderney allows people to ride motorbikes and mopeds without helmets and drive cars without seatbelts. The international vehicle registration code is GBA.

As in the rest of the Bailiwick of Guernsey, mopeds and motorbikes with an engine of 50cc or less can be driven from the age of 14 with a provisional licence.

== Utilities ==
The Alderney Water Board is responsible for the supply of water on the island. Water is sourced from bore holes and streams and is treated and stored at Corblets Quarry and Battery Quarry.

Electricity was first supplied on Alderney in 1934 by Mr. M.P.D. Marshall. The supply concession was transferred to Alderney Light and Power Company in 1939, which came under the control of the States of Guernsey Electricity Department, before reverting to the States of Alderney in 1950. Supplies from a new power station operated by Alderney Electricity Limited started on 1 April 1952. Electricity is generated by fuel oil driven generators. There are 3 × 2,000 kW, 2 × 50 kW and 2 × 450 kW engine generators. As of 2020, there are currently plans to develop tidal power and to construct a 220 kilometre France-Alderney-Britain cable link.

== Healthcare and emergency services ==
=== Fire and Ambulance Service ===
The Alderney Voluntary Fire Brigade has a crew of 12 volunteer firefighters, and operates one Iveco Daily light water tender with a 10.5 m ladder, two Iveco water carriers each with a capacity of 4,500 litres, one Ford Ranger rapid response unit and two trailer units. A new fire station was officially opened on 20 October 2004 by Lt.-General Sir John Foley, the Lieutenant Governor of Guernsey. The fire station is near Braye Harbour, has four appliance bays, a workshop, kit room, mess and a training room, and achieves an average response time of nine minutes. The Alderney Airport Fire and Rescue Service is sometimes called on to help with larger conflagrations.

In 2020, the Ambulance service merged into the Fire service to form the first combined fire and ambulance service in the British Isles outside of Dublin.

Until 2020, the St John Alderney Ambulance Service operated the ambulance service on the island, and was staffed by volunteers. It had served Alderney since 1952 and was registered as a private company. Patients are transferred to the Mignot Memorial Hospital in St Anne, and any having major complications are then transferred to Guernsey or Southampton by the Aurigny between 7 am and 7 pm on an emergency basis. Outside these hours or in the event of bad weather preventing an air evacuation the transfer is achieved with the aid of the RNLI lifeboat service. There was no paramedic service available on the island, but this has now changed

=== Police ===
Because of Alderney's low crime rate, day-to-day policing of Alderney is provided by a team of five locally based officers from the Guernsey Police, consisting of a sergeant in charge, two constables, and two special constables. They are regularly assisted by visiting constables from Guernsey. The police station is in QEII Street.

=== Lifeboats ===
The Alderney lifeboat station was established in 1869, was closed in 1884, and was re-established in 1985 by the RNLI. The lifeboat station operates an all-weather Trent class lifeboat

=== Search and rescue ===
Search and rescue services are provided by Channel Islands Air Search, which uses a Britten-Norman Islander to search large areas of water using infrared cameras and a number of other technologies. Formed in 1980, it is staffed entirely by volunteers and is based in Guernsey. When a major search is underway, the French coastguard and the Royal Navy are often involved, co-ordinated by the Maritime Rescue Co-ordination Centre in Jobourg, France.

== Notable people ==
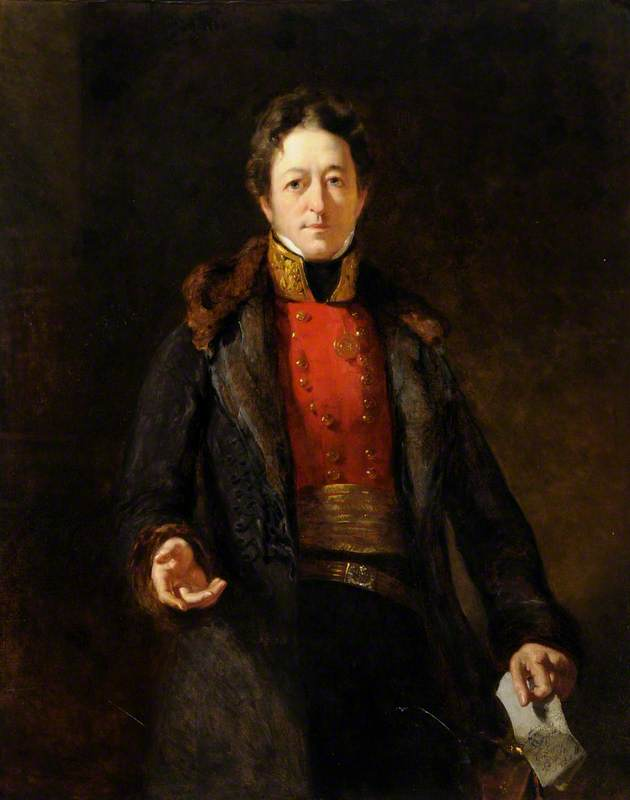
John Le Mesurier

- Thomas Le Mesurier (1756–1822), lawyer, cleric and polemicist.
- John Le Mesurier (1781–1843), soldier and until 1825 was the last hereditary Governor of Alderney
- J. R. Hancorn (1808–1861), medical doctor and author, a coastguard surgeon in the Isle of Sheppey.
- Sir Henry Gauvain (1878–1945), surgeon and tuberculosis specialist
- Crystal Bennett (1918–1987), archaeologist, pioneer of archaeological research in Jordan and founded the British Institute at Amman for Archaeology and History
- Peter Arnold MBE (1927-2013), art studio potter and founder of the Alderney Pottery.
- Sir Norman Browse, (1931– 2019) surgeon and President of the States of Alderney from 2002 to 2011
- Rachel Abbott (born 1952), author of psychological thrillers, lives locally
- Sarah Kelly (born ca 1970) a legal professional, was Greffier to the Jurats of Alderney, 2005 to 2015.

== Coins and stamps ==
- Alderney pound and coinage
- List of postage stamps of Alderney
- Postal orders of Alderney

== In popular culture ==
- In the 1976 film The Eagle Has Landed, Alderney is the location where the Nazis conduct an initial meeting to begin their plot to kidnap then Prime Minister Winston Churchill. The scenes in the film featuring Alderney were actually shot in Charlestown, Cornwall, England.
- In the song "Alderney" on her 2013 album The Sea Cabinet, Gwyneth Herbert tells the story of the sudden evacuation of Alderney's inhabitants during the Second World War and the irrevocable changes introduced during the Nazi occupation of the island.
- The Salvation Army composer Dean Goffin (1916–1984), from New Zealand, composed a brass band march entitled "Alderney".
- In the 2021 novel A Line to Kill by Anthony Horowitz, the island is featured as the setting. In which, during the island's Alderney Literary Festival, a murder takes place.

== Gallery ==
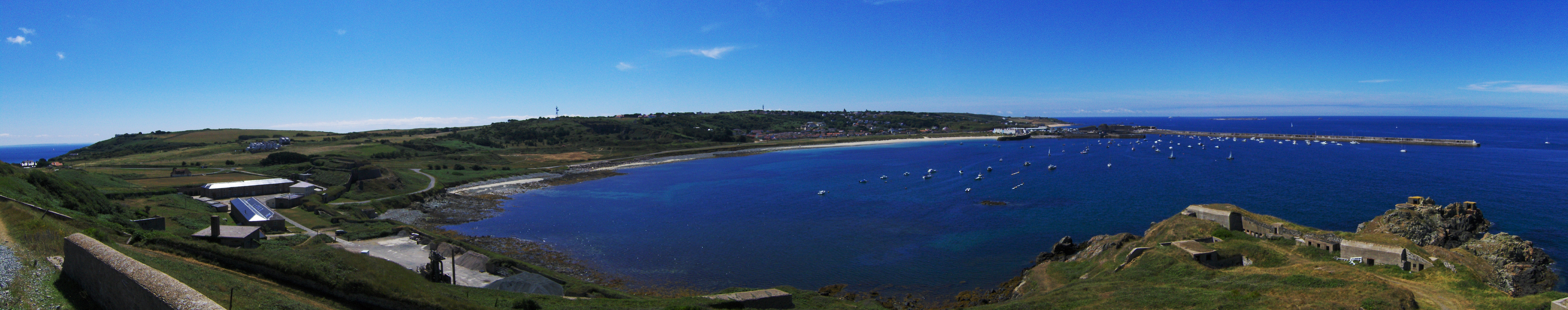
Overlooking Braye Bay

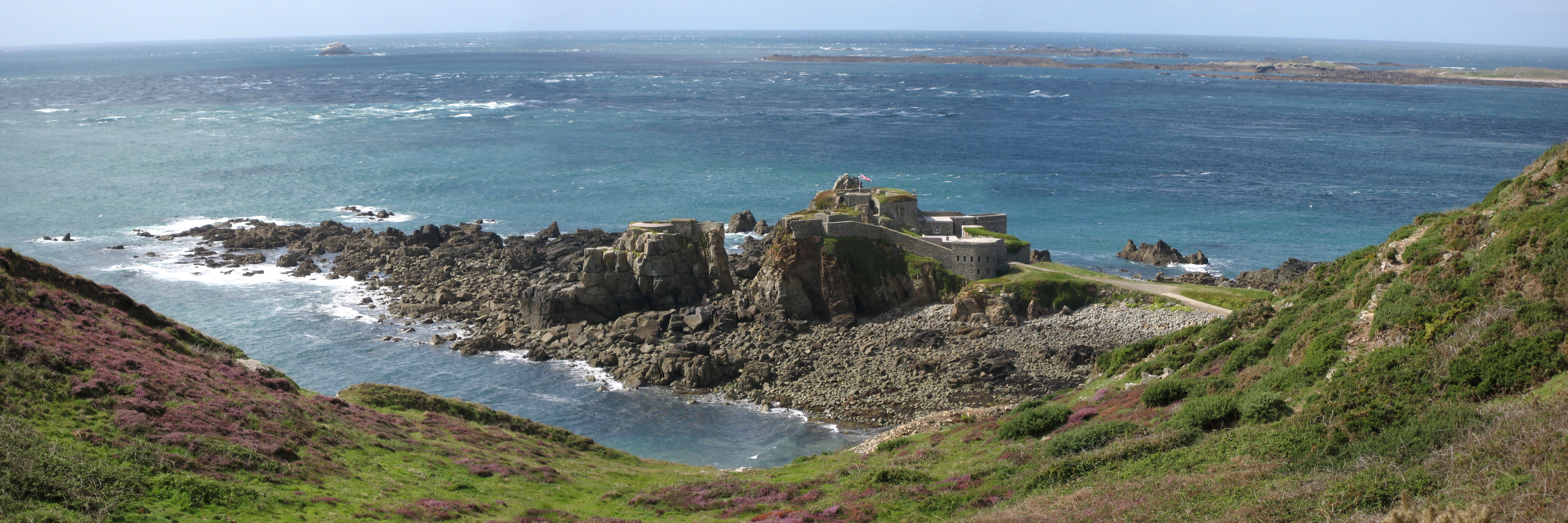
Fort Clonque—Burhou in the background

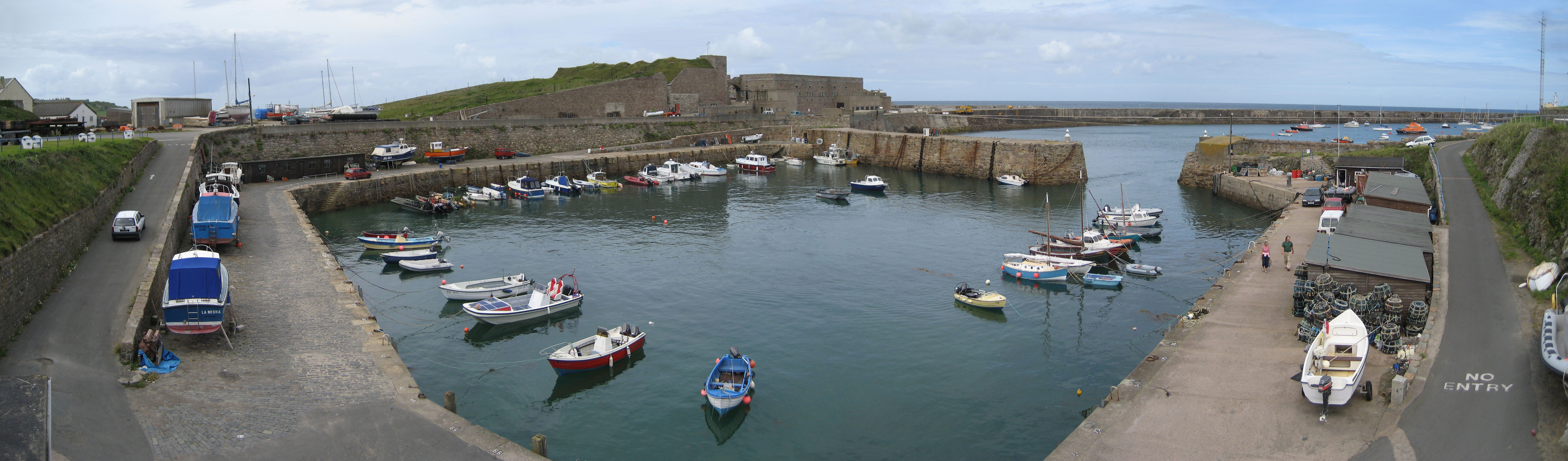
The inner harbour, breakwater designed by James Walker in the background

== See also ==
- Fortifications of Alderney
- Alderney Steam Packet Company
- Alderney camps
- Maritime history of the Channel Islands
- Archaeology of the Channel Islands
- Tourism in Alderney
