= Governor of Alderney =

The Governor of Alderney was the title of the Leader of the Channel Island of Alderney between 1660 and 1825. The position eventually became a hereditary governorship after the fief was purchased from the Crown.

== History ==
In 1660, as a reward for his loyalty to the Crown during the English Civil War, Edward de Carteret was granted the title of Governor of Alderney by King Charles II. De Carteret as Governor of Alderney superseded Nicholas Ling, the leader of Alderney as Lieutenant-Governor under Oliver Cromwell, as the leader of Alderney while Ling retained the Lieutenant-Governorship under de Carteret until he died. When de Carteret died, the governorship was in abeyance with acting governors taking the titular leadership of Alderney until 1680 when his widow sold the title to Sir Edmund Andros.

In 1683, Andros was granted the island of Alderney for ninety-nine years in exchange for an annual rent of thirteen shillings. This led to the Governor of Alderney holding a hereditary position similar to the Seigneur of Sark. When Andros was appointed as the Governor of New York and left Alderney for British America, he delegated the role of governor of Alderney to Thomas Le Mesurier, whom he was related to through marriage. After Andros died, the Le Mesurier family took control of the governorship with the initial grant being extended by King George III.

In 1825, the governor, John Le Mesurier III resigned the grant of the island, returning it to the Crown in exchange for an annual pension of £700 (approximately £40,900 in 2014) in an agreement which eventually expired in 1862.
