= States of Alderney Member =

State in the Island of Alderney

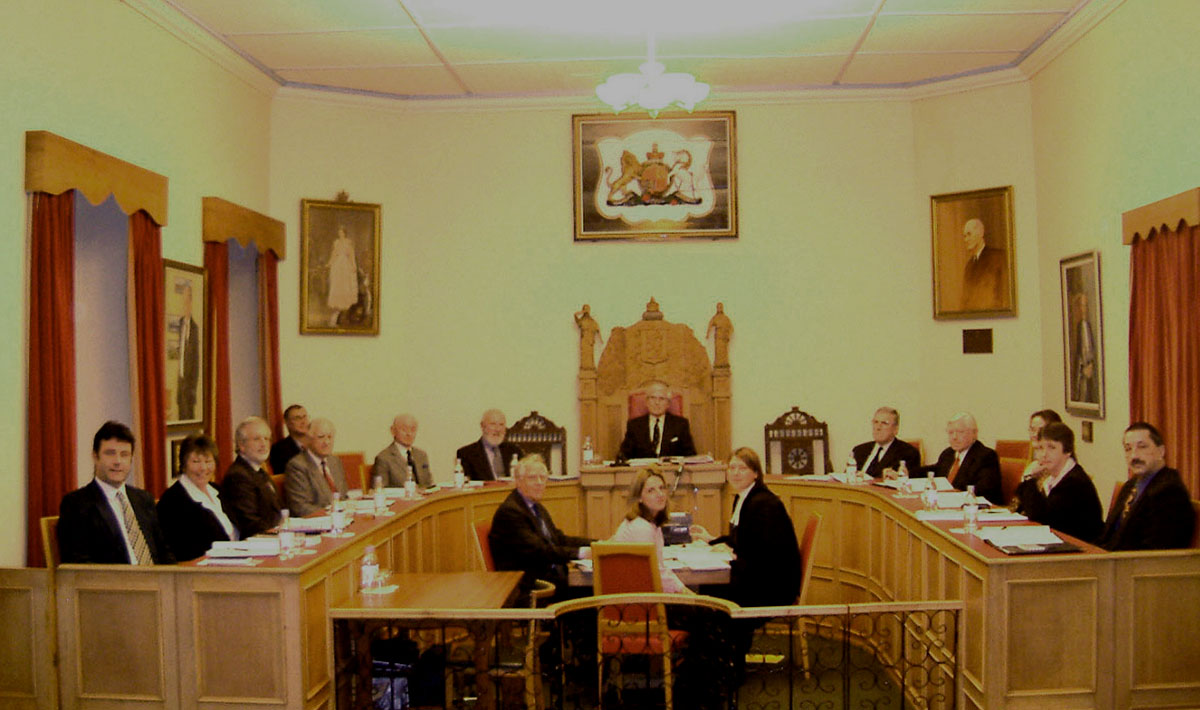
The States of Alderney in Session, 2005

The ten states of Alderney Members make up the legislature (the States of Alderney) of the island of Alderney in the Channel Islands. Half of the ten States Members are elected every two years for a four-year mandate. They are organised into three main committees: Policy and Finance, General Services, and Building and Development Control, each of which works under a different mandate and has a separate budget. There are also numerous smaller committees. A state meeting is held every month and is chaired by the island's president.

== Current members ==
The current members were elected in the elections of 2022 and elections of 2020. They are:

Elected in 2022 (Note: The members elected in 2022 hold office until 2026)	Elected in 2020 (Note: The members elected in 2020 hold office until 2024)
Bill Abel	Alex Snowdon (Note: Alderney representatives to the States of Guernsey)
Steve Roberts	Ian Carter
Nigel Vooght	Kevin Gentle
Bruce Woodhead	Rhys Jenkins
vacant	Boyd Kelly

== See also ==
- Elections in Alderney
