= States of Alderney =

Legislature in Alderney, Guernsey

States of Alderney États d'Aurigny (in French)

Type
- Type: Unicameral

History
- Founded: 1771

Leadership
- President: William Tate since 2019

Structure
- Seats: 10
- Political groups: Independent (10)

Elections
- Last election: 7 December 2024
- Next election: December 2026

Meeting place
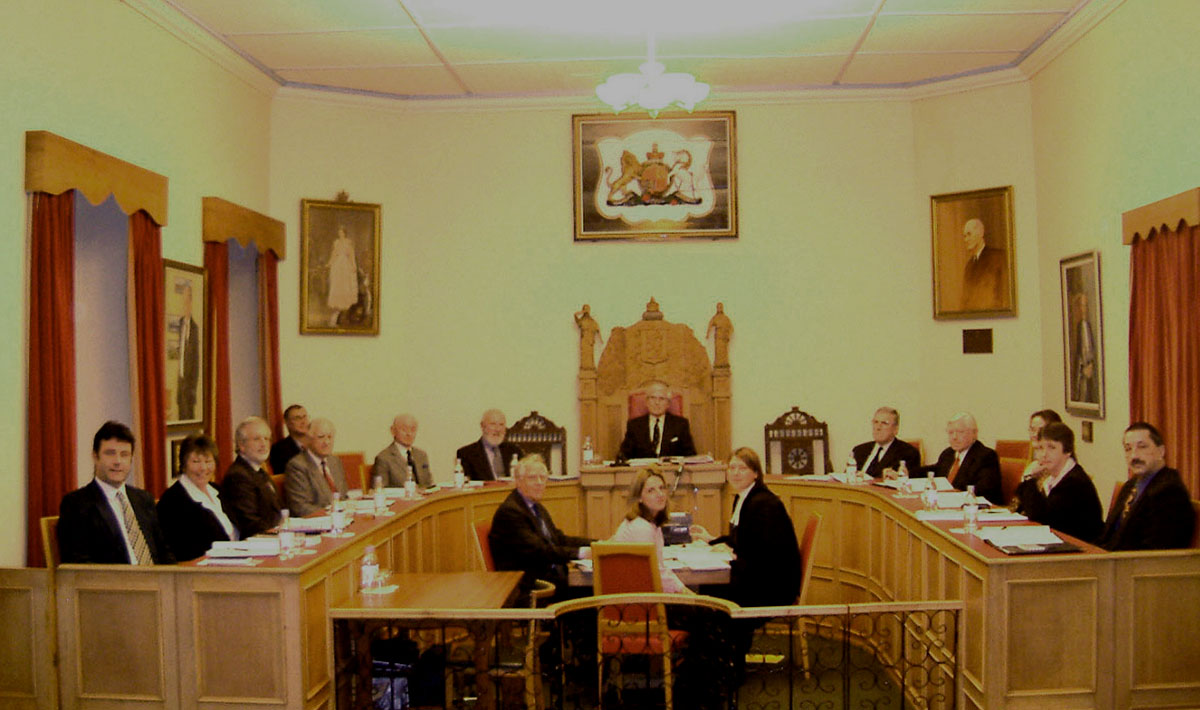
- States of Alderney Chamber

Website
- www.alderney.gov.gg/

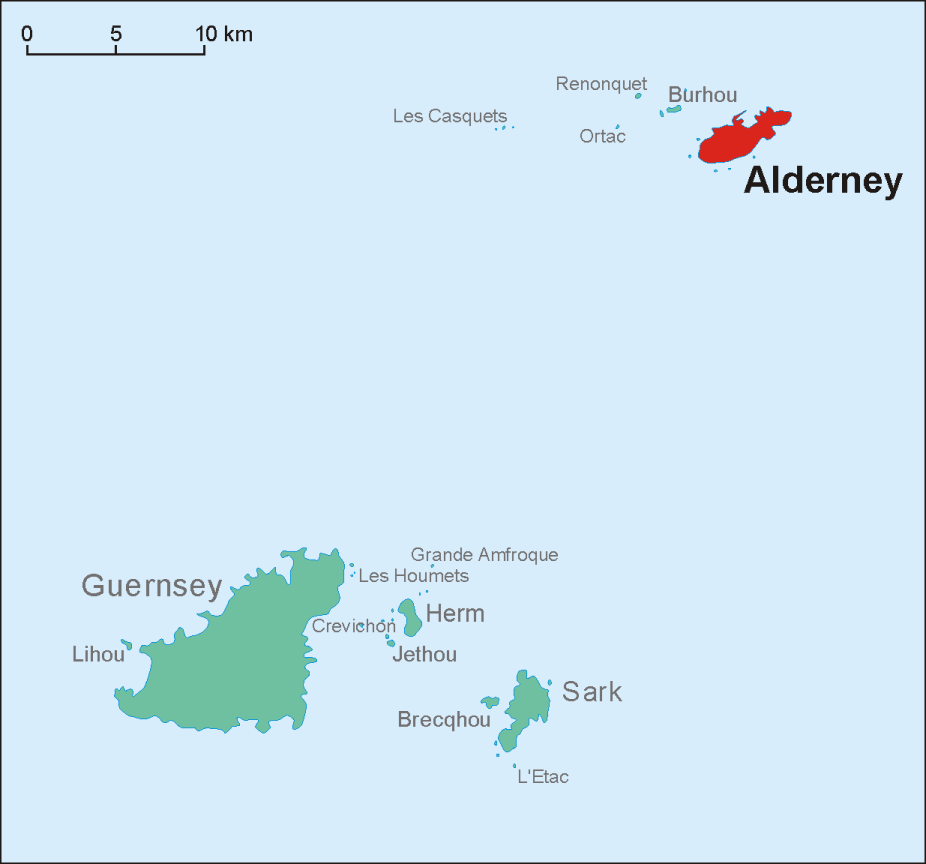
The Location of Alderney in the Bailiwick of Guernsey

The States of Alderney (French: États d'Aurigny) is the parliament/council and the legislature of Alderney, part of the Bailiwick of Guernsey. The origin of the States is unknown, but it has operated from the medieval period. The States of Alderney comprises ten Members, and a President of the States of Alderney, currently William Tate who was elected in 2019 and re-elected in 2020.

== Structure ==
The States of Alderney includes ten members elected for four years terms, with half of the members having to stand for election every two years so that the entire parliament is changed over a period of four years. There is also a president who must stand for election every four years, although there is no constitutional limit on the number of terms he may serve.

Routine government is performed by three committees, Policy and Finance, General Services, and Building and Development Control, each of which works under a different mandate and has a separate budget. Extra committees are usually formed in order to deal with specific areas of policy, such as the Commonwealth Parliamentary Association Management Committee. In addition, two members of the States are nominated as representatives to the Guernsey States of Deliberation.

== Legal status ==
The island is a self-governing Crown Dependency, part of the Bailiwick of Guernsey since Elizabethan times. Certain services, known as 'transferred services', are provided in Alderney by the Guernsey Government under an agreement entered into between the States of Alderney and the States of Guernsey in 1948 ('the 1948 Agreement').

Defence and foreign policy are reserved to the Crown, which in modern constitutional terms means the relevant United Kingdom government departments (the Ministry of Defence and the Foreign and Commonwealth Office). The UK liaises with Alderney (as with all Crown Dependencies), through the Ministry of Justice. Formally, ultimate legislative, executive and judicial authority continues to vest in the Privy Council which approves all primary legislation passed by the States of Alderney, and through its Judicial Committee, is its highest court of appeal.

By constitutional convention, the British Crown does not involve itself directly in Alderney domestic government, although it retains a theoretical ability to do so if 'good government' is at risk. (There is an analogous power in respect of the British Overseas Territories which has been exercised in recent years, in order to deal with systemic corruption in the Turks and Caicos Islands.)

== Elections ==
The President of the States of Alderney is directly elected every four years.

Half of the ten States Members are elected every two years for a four-year mandate, which means that every four years the composition of the parliament changes completely. The election held on 6 December 2008 had a turnout of over 700 people produced a frequency of 65.6%. The whole island is a single constituency.

The current members were elected in the elections of 2020, the elections of 2022 and a by-election in 2023.

They are:

	Elected in
Bill Abel	2022
Ian Carter	2020
Kevin Gentle	2020
Rhys Jenkins	2020
Boyd Kelly	2020
Steve Roberts (Note: Alderney representatives to the States of Guernsey)	2022
Alex Snowdon	2020
Nigel Vooght	2022
Bruce Woodhead	2022
Derwent Smithurst	2023

Two elected members represent Alderney in the States of Guernsey

== History ==
Although the origins of the States of Alderney are unknown, it has functioned since the Middle Ages, making it one of the world's oldest parliaments.

Less than 50% of Alderney's population had returned to the island after the Second World War. This led to the Parliament of the United Kingdom discussing what to do with Alderney as land ownership markers and official papers had been destroyed in the war and Alderney's economy was stagnating as a result of more than half of the islanders not returning. The United Kingdom's Home Secretary, Chuter Ede, recommended "Guernseyfication" of Alderney. In 1948 His Majesty's Privy Council decided that Alderney would become a part of the Bailiwick of Guernsey again. Later in the year, both the States of Alderney and the States of Guernsey voted through the Alderney (Application of Legislation) Law which gave powers to the States of Guernsey in respect of certain "transferred services" in 1949. The law also provided for a democratically elected President of the States of Alderney to be the Leader of Alderney as the Judge of Alderney had been superseded as the representative of the Crown on Alderney by the Lieutenant Governor of Guernsey.

== List of Members of the States of Alderney ==
The current members were elected in the 2024 election. With some members running for re-election for the upcoming 2026 election.

elected in the 2024 election
Edward Hill	Bill Abel
Iain MacFarlane	Steve Roberts
Stuart Clark	Nigel Vooght
Kevin Gentle	Bruce Woodhead
Alex Snowdon	Derwent Smithurst
