= List of bailiffs of Guernsey =

This is a list of holders of the post of Bailiff of Guernsey.

== 13th century ==
- Hugh de Trubleville (1270–1277)
- William de St Remi (1278–1281)
- Raynald de Ashwell (1282–1287)
- William de St Remi (1288–1291)
- William de St Remi (1292–1296)
- Nicholas de Cheney (1297)
- Peter Le Marchant (1298)
- Radulph de Gand (1299)
- Robert Comberwell (1300)

== 14th century ==
- Radulph de Haverland (1301)
- John de Newent (1302)
- Radulph Gaultier (1303)
- Peter Le Marchant (1304)
- Massey de la Court (1305–1309)
- James de Vinchelez (1310)
- Robert Le Gay (1311–1312)
- Walter de la Hogue (1313–1314)
- Massey de la Court (1315–1316)
- Peter Le Marchant (1317)
- Massey de la Court (1318)
- Robert Le Gay (1319)
- Radulph Gaultier (1320)
- John Le Marchant (1321)
- James de Vinchelez (1322)
- William Le Petit (1323)
- William de Souslemont (1324)
- William Le Petit (1325)
- Peter de Garis (1326)
- Henry de St Martin (1327)
- Radulph Le Gay (1328)
- Radulph Cokerel (1329)
- Geoffrey de la Hogue (1330)
- Thomas d'Esterfield (1331)
- Radulph Le Gay (1332–1339)
- John de la Lande (1340–1346)
- John de la Lande (1347–1356)
- John Le Marchant (1357–1383)
- John Nicholas (1384–1386)
- Gervase de Clermont (1387–1411)

== 15th century ==
- James Cocquerel (1412–1432)
- Thomas de la Court (1433–1445)
- John Henry (1446–1447)
- William Cartier (1447–1465)
- Thomas de la Court (1466–1469)
- Peter de Beauvoir (1470–1479)
- Edmund de Cheney (1480–1481)
- Nicholas Fouaschin (1481–1482)
- John Blondel (1483–1498)
- John Martin (1499–1510)

== 16th century ==
- James Guille (1511–1537)
- Thomas Compton (1538–1544)
- John Haryvell (1545–1549)
- Hellier Gosselin (1549–1562)
- Thomas Compton (1562–1570)
- William de Beauvoir (1571–1581)
- Thomas Wigmore (1581–1588)
- Louis de Vic (1588–1600)

== 17th century ==
- Amice de Carteret (1601–1631)
- John de Quetteville (1631–1643)
- Peter de Beauvoir (1644–1651, 1652–1653, 1656–1660)
- Amias Andros (1661–1674)
- Edmund Andros (1674–1713)

== 18th century ==
- John de Sausmarez (1714–1728)
- Josuah Le Marchant (1728–1751)
- Eleazar Le Marchant (1752–1758)
- Samuel Bonamy (1758–1771)
- William Le Marchant (1771–1800)
- Robert Porrett Le Marchant (1800–1810)

== 19th century ==
- Peter de Havilland (1810–1821)
- Daniel de Lisle Brock (1821–1843)
- John Guille (1843–1845)
- Peter Stafford Carey (1845–1883)
- John de Havilland Utermarck (1883–1884)
- Edgar MacCulloch (1884–1895)
- Thomas Godfrey Carey (1895–1902)

== 20th century ==
- Henry Alexander Giffard (1902–1908)
- William Carey (1908–1915)
- Edward Chepmell Ozanne (1915–1922)
- Havilland Walter de Sausmarez (1922–1929)
- Arthur William Bell (1929–1935)
- Victor Carey (1935–1946)
- Ambrose Sherwill (1946–1959)
- William Arnold (1959–1973)
- John Loveridge (1973–1982)
- Charles Frossard (1982–1992)
- Graham Martyn Dorey (1992–1999)
- de Vic Carey (1999–2005)

== 21st century ==
- Geoffrey Rowland (2005–2012)
- Richard Collas (2012–2020)
- Richard McMahon (2020–2026)
- Jessica Roland (2026–present)

== See also ==
- List of governors of Guernsey
- List of lieutenant governors of Guernsey
- List of bailiffs of Jersey
- List of lieutenant governors of Jersey
