= 2022 in Guernsey =

Events in the year 2022 in Guernsey.

== Incumbents ==
- Duke of Normandy: Elizabeth II (until 8 September); Charles III onwards
- Lieutenant governor: Richard Cripwell
- Chief minister: Peter Ferbrache
- Bailiff: Richard McMahon

== Events ==
- June 2–5: A four-day bank holiday in Guernsey in celebration of the Platinum Jubilee of Elizabeth II.
- 8 September: Elizabeth II dies at Balmoral Castle, Scotland, Charles III assumed position of Duke of Normandy.
- 9 September: As with other locations throughout the Commonwealth, a death gun salute of 96 rounds representing the years of the Queen's life were fired.
- 26 November: The scheduled 2022 Alderney general election are cancelled due to a lack of candidates.
- 10 December: 2022 Alderney plebiscite election
- 14 December: The scheduled 2022 Sark general election are cancelled due to a lack of candidates.

== Sports ==
- Guernsey at the 2022 Commonwealth Games
