= 2025 in Guernsey =

Events in the year 2025 in Guernsey.

== Incumbents ==
- Duke of Normandy: Charles III
- Lieutenant governor: Richard Cripwell
- Bailiff: Richard McMahon

== Events ==
- 15 March: Guernsey FC play their final match at Footes Lane, moving to the new Victoria Park.
- 18 June: 2025 Guernsey general election.
