= 2021 in Guernsey =

Events in the year 2021 in Guernsey.

== Incumbents ==
- Duke of Normandy: Elizabeth II
- Lieutenant governor: Ian Corder
- Chief minister: Peter Ferbrache
- Bailiff: Richard McMahon

== Events ==
Ongoing: COVID-19 pandemic in Guernsey

- January 23: A second lockdown is enforced in Guernsey due to another wave of rising COVID-19 cases.
- March 22: The final lockdown of the COVID-19 pandemic ends in Guernsey.

== Deaths ==
- 13 November: Sir Alexander Boswell, 93, British Army officer, lieutenant governor of Guernsey (1985–1990).
