= Capital punishment in Guernsey =

Capital punishment in Guernsey was abolished for murder in 1964 (with effect from 1965) and for all offences in 2003. The move for abolition for murder in 1964 was led by the island's Bailiff, Sir William Arnold.

Prior to abolition, the death penalty had not been used since 1854. The last person to be executed in Guernsey was the English murderer John Tapner, who was hanged on 10 February 1854.
