= Charles Frossard =

Charles Frossard may refer to:

- Charles Auguste Frossard (1807–1875), French general
- Charles Frossard (bailiff) (1922–2012), bailiff of Guernsey, 1982–1992
