= De Vic Carey =

Sir de Vic Carey

Bailiff of Guernsey
- In office 1999–2005
- Preceded by: Graham Dorey
- Succeeded by: Geoffrey Rowland

Personal details
- Born: 15 June 1940 (age 86)
- Children: 4
- Relatives: Victor Carey (grandfather)
- Education: Trinity Hall, Cambridge (BA, MA); University of Caen

Sir de Vic Graham Carey (born 15 June 1940) was Bailiff of Guernsey from 1999 to 2005. He is the son of advocate Victor Michael Graham de Vic ("Michael") Carey and Jean (née Bullen).

At the age of 10 days, he evacuated to England with his parents in the face of German invasion. His grandfather Victor (later Sir Victor) Carey remained as Bailiff and Civil Lieutenant Governor throughout the occupation. His father joined the Somerset Light Infantry and de Vic's early years were spent in Somerset. The family returned to Guernsey in 1945. de Vic was sent away to board at Cheam School and then Bryanston. In 1959, he matriculated at Trinity Hall, Cambridge and graduated as a BA in 1962 (MA 1967).

== Career ==
After university, he served articles of clerkship with a firm of city solicitors and became a Solicitor of the Supreme Court of Judicature in June 1965. He then decided to pursue his career in Guernsey, obtaining the Certificat d’études Juridiques Françaises Normandes from the University of Caen, before being sworn in as an Advocate of the Royal Court of Guernsey in January 1966. He joined Graham (later Sir Graham) Dorey as a partner in the family firm of Carey Son and Dorey, reconstituted as Carey Langlois and Co. after Graham moved into Crown service in 1973.

In March 1976, he was elected as People's Deputy in the States of Deliberation for the St. Peter Port electoral district resigning some eight months later when he was appointed HM Comptroller or Solicitor General for the Bailiwick of Guernsey advancing to the office of Procureur or Attorney General in 1982. In 1985 he was appointed to hold the office of HM Receiver General as well as that of HM Procureur, a practice that has continued with his successors.

In 1992, he was sworn into office as Deputy Bailiff and Deputy President of the States of Deliberation. In 1999 he became the 87th Bailiff of Guernsey retiring in 2005. He also served as President of the Guernsey Court of Appeal and as a Judge of the Jersey Court of Appeal. After he retired as Bailiff, he served part-time as a Lieutenant Bailiff, a Commissioner of the Royal Court of Jersey and an Ordinary judge of the Guernsey Court of Appeal. He retired from these judicial offices on 15 June 2012.

He was knighted in the New Years Honours of 2002 for services to the Crown.

From 2009 to 2015, he served as Deputy Chair of the Children's Convenor and Youth Tribunal Board which was established to implement the provisions of the Children (Guernsey) Law 2008. That law was enacted to make radical changes to the way cases involving children and young persons were to be dealt with in Guernsey, including establishing a tribunal of lay members similar to one which had been operating in Scotland for some years.

Sir de Vic has held a number of lay appointments in the Church of England as Churchwarden of St. Peter Port 1967–1970 and St. Saviour's 2009–2015, Lay Chairman of the Deaney Synod 1971–1997, lay member General Synod 1982–1998, and Lay Chairman Winchester Diocesan Synod 1994–1997.

== Personal life ==
On 22 June 1968, he married Bridget, daughter of the late Major John Lindsay Smith 7th Gurkha Rifles (killed in action in 1944) at Wymondham Abbey, Norfolk. They had four children: Perrin, born 1971; Jenette (now Bales), born 1974; Henrietta (now Aparicio), born 1979; and Julius, born 1980.

Legal offices
Preceded by Sir Graham Dorey	Bailiff of Guernsey; 1999 – 2005	Succeeded by Sir Geoffrey Rowland
