= Daniel de Lisle Brock =

19th-century English bailiff

Daniel de Lisle Brock (1762–1842) was Bailiff of Guernsey from 1821 until his death 1842.

The Brocks were an English family who had been established in Guernsey since the sixteenth century. Daniel was a nephew of William Brock (1725–1768), of Brockhurst, St Peter Port (now owned by the National Trust of Guernsey), who was married to Judith de Beauvoir; and Henry Brock, who was married to Susan, sister of Admiral James Saumarez, 1st Baron de Saumarez. Daniel was one of fourteen children, ten of whom attained maturity. He was an elder brother of Major-General Sir Isaac Brock.

== Early life ==
After such schooling as the island afforded in those days, he was placed at Alderney to learn French under the tuition of M. Vallat, a Swiss pastor, afterwards rector of St. Peter-in-the-Wood, Guernsey, and subsequently at a school at Richmond, Surrey.

He was, however, taken away at the age of fourteen to accompany his father, who was in failing health, to France, where the latter died at Dinan. He spent about twelve months in visiting the Mediterranean, Switzerland, and France, in 1785-6,

== Adult life ==
Twelve years later, in 1798, at the age of 36, he was elected a Jurat of the royal court of Guernsey, from which time his name is intimately associated with the history of his native place and its independence from England.

On four separate occasions, between 1804 and 1810, he was deputed by the states and Royal Court of Guernsey to represent them in London, in respect of certain measures affecting the trade and ancient privileges of the island. The third occasion was to defend against the Royal Navy trying to impress island men, this was argued in opposition to his brother-in-law, Admiral James Saumarez.

In 1821, following the death of Sir Peter de Havilland, he was appointed Bailiff, or chief magistrate, of the island, and soon after was again despatched to London, to protest, which he did with success, against the extension to Guernsey of the new law prohibiting the import of corn until the price should reach 80s. a quarter.

In 1827, Brock said that "To bring about the improvements which are to the joy, the health, and the well-being of the inhabitants, the States (of Guernsey) have issued notes amounting to £55,000." In 1815 Guernsey had had no roads, there was danger of the sea overflowing large tracts of land, there was little or no trade, little or no disposable revenue and no prospect of employment for the poor.

The suggestion was put forward that the States should take advantage of their ancient privilege and print their own notes to finance various projects to remedy the situation. The Finance Committee reported that £5,000 was wanted for roads, while they had only £1,000 on hand. It was agreed to raise the remaining £4000 by the issue of State £1 notes. This was done and the result was so successful that it was followed by further creations of State money. In 1819 the market, and in 1826 Elizabeth College and some parochial schools were built. Other projects, including the widening of the streets of St. Peter Port; the reconstruction of some of its buildings, new roads and new public works of many kinds, were financed in this way over a period of twenty years.

In 1830, however, the banks launched a counter-attack and began to flood the island with their own notes. A compromise was arranged and the States agreed to limit their note issue to £40,000. From 1836 to 1914 the position remained unchanged. The States notes were issued free of interest.

An engraving of Brock appears on the reverse side of the 1991 States of Guernsey £1 note. The Market (French Halles) now Market Square or Market Place at St. Peter Port appears on the obverse.

In 1832, when the right of the inhabitants to be tried in their own courts was menaced by a proposed extension of the power of writs of habeas corpus to the island, Brock and Mr. Charles de Jersey, king's procureur, were sent to London to oppose the measure, and did so with success.

Three years later Brock was once more despatched to London at the head of a deputation to protest against the proposed deprivation of the Channel Islands of their right of exporting corn into England free of duty. Owing to the remonstrance of the deputation, a select committee of the House of Commons was appointed to inquire into the subject, and the bill was subsequently withdrawn. On this occasion the states of Jersey presented Brock with a service of plate, and his portrait was placed in the royal court-house of Guernsey.

Brock was married and had two children: a son, who became a captain in the 20th foot, and a daughter. He died in Guernsey on 24 September 1842. A public funeral was accorded to his remains, in recognition of his long and valued services to his native island.

Legal offices
Preceded by Sir Peter de Havilland	Bailiff of Guernsey; 1821–1843	Succeeded by Jean Guille
