= Law of Guernsey =

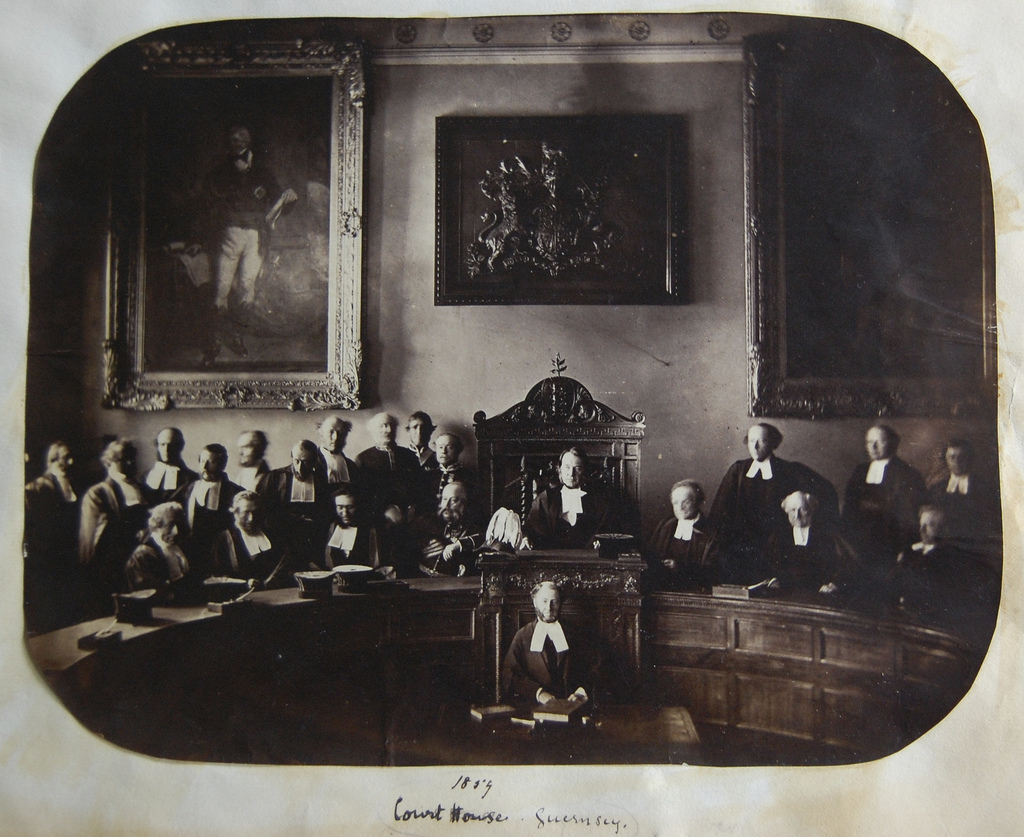
Guernsey Courthouse and officials, photographed in 1859

The Law of Guernsey originates in Norman customary law, overlaid with principles taken from English common law and French law, as well as from statute law enacted by the competent legislature(s) – usually, but not always, the States of Guernsey.

In some circumstances a Guernsey statute will include Alderney and sometimes Sark. Alderney and Sark are separate dependencies of the Crown within the Bailiwick of Guernsey, whose legislatures—the States of Alderney (Les Etats d'Aurigny) and Chief Pleas of Sark have the power of primary legislation. Alderney and Sark have their own legal systems which, whilst very similar to Guernsey's and having the same origins, do differ in significant aspects, such as inheritances. The States of Guernsey however, may only legislate for Alderney and Sark with consent - there is no freestanding power so to do. This is normally only done when it is necessary to enact legislation for matters that are common to the Bailiwick as a whole (such as financial regulation or the transposition of UK and European legislation into the domestic law of all three jurisdictions). Examples of this are the Data Protection (Bailiwick of Guernsey) Law and the Human Rights (Bailiwick of Guernsey) Law.

Guernsey has almost complete autonomy over internal affairs and certain external matters. However, the Crown – that is to say, the UK Government – retains an ill-defined reserved power to intervene in the domestic affairs of any of the Crown Dependencies 'in the interests of good government'. The UK Parliament is also a source of Guernsey law for those matters which are reserved to the UK, which are defence and foreign affairs. An example of such a law is the Immigration Act 1971.

== Sources of law ==
Derived by the customary power of the monarch to lay down the law. In Guernsey's case the monarch is the successor to the dukes of Normandy.

=== Royal Charters ===
The Royal Charters, going back to 1341 set out the rights and privileges of the people in the Bailiwick of Guernsey.

=== Law enacted in Guernsey ===
==== Orders in Council ====
The deliberative assembly of the States of Guernsey (États de Guernesey) is called the States of Deliberation (États de Délibération). The Bailiff or Deputy Bailiff preside in the assembly.

After a draft law has been made public, the members of the States discuss the proposed Projet de Loi, which is the equivalent of a UK Bill or a French projet de loi, and a Law is the equivalent of a UK Act of Parliament or a French loi. A draft Law passed by the States can have no legal effect until formally approved by His Majesty in Council and promulgated by means of an Order in Council. Laws are given the Royal Sanction at regular meetings of the Privy Council in London, after which they are returned to the Islands for formal registration at the Royal Court. Sanction can be delayed for years, or refused, however rules have developed over the centuries to avoid a constitutional crisis.

There is a proposal, which was approved, with amendments, by Order In Council on 21 February 2024 and goes into effect on 29 February 2024, that the Lieutenant Governor of Guernsey should be granted the power of Royal Assent to enable laws to be granted approval within six weeks if no objection was raised rather than refer every law to London. "At present there is a situation where Channel Island law-making depends, ultimately, on the UK government of the day, unelected by the islands."

==== Ordinances ====
The States also make delegated legislation known as Ordinances (Ordonnances) and Orders (Ordres) which do not require the Royal Assent. Commencement orders are usually in the form of Ordinances. Since 1948, Ordinances no longer have a one-year time limit, they are permanent.

==== Statutory Instruments ====
Secondary legislation, such as laws relating to rubbish collection and data protection laws.

=== Legislation imposed on Guernsey ===
==== Acts of Parliament ====
Certain laws affecting Guernsey can be imposed on Guernsey by the United Kingdom government and are registered as Guernsey laws to extend them to the Bailiwick. Examples include the Landmines Act 1998 ( becoming the Landmines Act 1998 (Guernsey) Order 2000) and the Police Act 1997. There have been many cases in history of Guernsey simply not registering Parliamentary laws which has the effect of nullifying them. Convention requires Parliamentary laws to (a) not go beyond the prerogative powers over the Islands and (b) should be consonant with aspects of modern law. In many cases it is logical to take Parliamentary legislation and if useful and applicable to the Bailiwick, mirror it, or adopt it with few, if any, changes into a Guernsey law, such as the Civil Aviation Act 1946 (through the Civil Aviation Act (Extension to the Channel Islands) Order, 1947).

Since 1967, when the United Kingdom applied for membership of the European Economic Community, the UK made it plain that certain laws passed by European Union bodies would apply to Guernsey, through the United Kingdom connection. Negotiations on terms were concluded in 1971 resulting in the European Communities (Bailiwick of Guernsey) Law, 1973 allowing EU regulations to have immediate effect in Guernsey. Additional effects on Guernsey followed the Treaty of Maastricht,1992, the Treaty of Amsterdam,1997, the Treaty of Nice, 2001 and the Treaty of Lisbon, 2004. Amongst other matters, the Bailiwick has fiscal autonomy, but has accepted European human rights in 1971.

Whilst it is a strong constitutional convention that the UK does not normally legislate for the Crown Dependencies without the explicit consent of their Governments, in law it does have the power to do so. This may be done in two ways. Historically, Acts of Parliament might have been expressed to extend to the Channel Islands and the Isle of Man on the face of the Act, but nowadays the practice would be to provide that the UK Government can extend the provisions of an Act to the Channel Islands (and the Isle of Man) by Order-in-Council or by ministerial order. (There is only one example of the British Parliament legislating for a Crown Dependency in modern times (i.e. since the Statute of Westminster) which was the imposition by the Wilson Government of the Marine Broadcasting Offences Act 1967 (a UK Act) to the Isle of Man and its incorporation to Manx Law without the consent of Tynwald (the Isle of Man's Parliament). It would seem this power quite likely exists in the case of Guernsey similarly, but it has never been tested.

== History ==
The original laws have origins in Roman Law, a uniform law, which spread by way of naturalisation in the immense empire. With the decline of the empire, Frankish Law being applied by the 9th century. The arrival of Viking invaders in the 10th century brought out law based more on custom.

Custom is a source of law in the Guernsey legal system. It can be described as "the product of generally accepted usage and practice.” Many rules of customary law have crystallised to such an extent through repeated acknowledgment that they are accepted as law, almost without argument.

=== Early laws ===
The earliest law is probably the "Clameur de Haro" in the Channel Islands. It is, supposedly, an appeal to Rollo who ruled Normandy and the Channel Islands from 911-927 and is a form of injunction to stop someone who is damaging private land. The most recent case of this being used was the case of Gillingham -v- Noone where a Clameur de Haro was registered by the Court of Alderney at a special sitting on Saturday 28 January 2017.

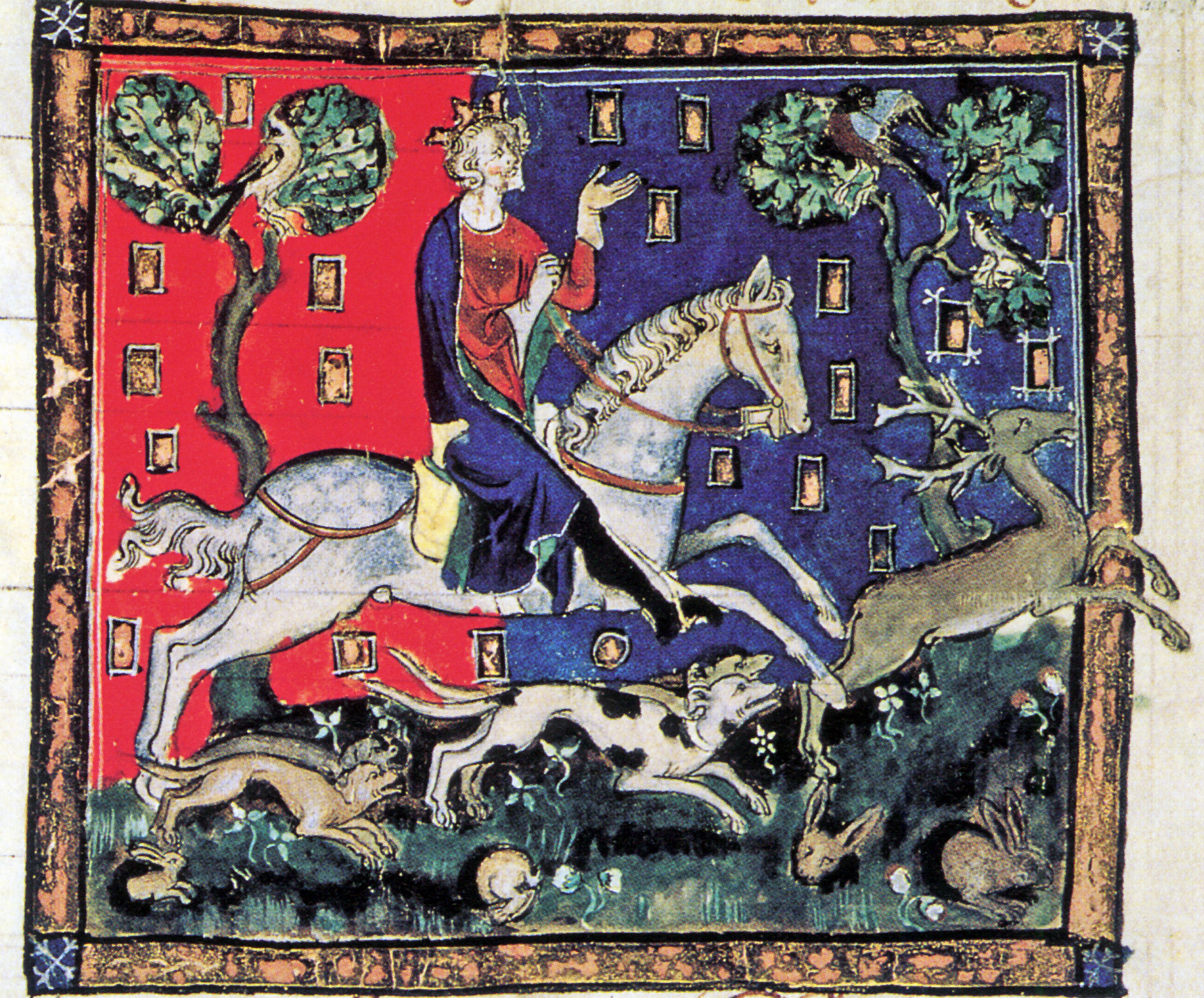
King John from De Rege Johanne

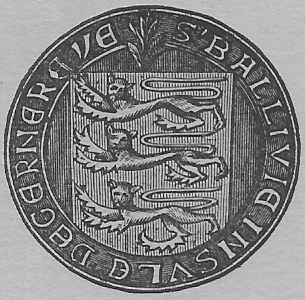
Guernsey seal arms of Bailiwick

King John, who reigned from 1199 to 1216, lost the English-controlled territories in Normandy in France following the 1204 Siege of Château Gaillard, the remaining Norman lands being the Channel Islands. King John promised the islands independence and the right to continue governing themselves after they confirmed their allegiance to the English Crown. Agents of the Crown called bailiffs would enforce the laws and run the courts, one in Jersey and one in Guernsey; the areas under the authority of these bailiffs were called bailiwicks. In 1259 at the Treaty of Paris the English King Henry III renounced the claim to Normandy that was under the control of the King of France; this excluded the Channel Islands, which were controlled by the English throne.

Attempts to change the government, law and independence have been made over the centuries, a constitutional struggle started as the Islands insisted on wanting Norman law. This struggle involved Edward I (1272-1307), Edward II (1307-1327) and Edward III (1327-1377), and are linked to an invasion of Guernsey in 1294 which took several years before the French were expelled. Another attempt in 1336 and yet another in 1338 resulted in both the improved training of the militia and a Royal Charter of 1341 confirming the Islands' constitution, this Charter being ratified by successive sovereigns. The ratification by Elizabeth I of 1560 set out in detail the rights of the Bailiwick of Guernsey.

A seal granted to the Channel Islands in 1279 and to each of Guernsey and Jersey in 1304 have become symbols of Guernsey's separate identity from both Jersey and the United Kingdom.

=== Customary law ===
The customary law of the Duchy of Normandy is particularly influential as a source of law. Norman law developed in two main epochs: the "Ancienne coutume" (1199–1538) and the "Coutume reformée" (1538–1804).

==== Ancienne coutume ====
The earliest Norman law was based on oral tradition and repeated practices in feudal society. The earliest known written account of the ancienne coutume of Normandy is the Très-ancienne coutume, first set down in Latin manuscript around 1199 to 1223. It was translated into French, probably in about 1230. The second, dating between 1235 and 1258 and called Grand Coutumier, comprised 125 articles setting out all matters including jurisdiction, judicial officers, various ducal rights (such as wrecks and treasure trove), various forms of feudal tenure, legal procedure and remedies, succession law, criminal law and punishment, various forms of civil dispute, possession actions, other forms of court action and prescription. It was this law that formed the basis of customary law until 1583.

The Grand Coutumier in Guernsey started to diverge from the French version as local customs were added to it.

==== Coutume Reformée of Normandy ====
In 1454, Charles VII of France issued orders that all the customary laws of France should be "redacted", in other words set out systematically and approved under royal authority. The Duchy of Normandy was the last part of France to comply with this order, but the new text was eventually prepared and received royal approval in 1585 by Henry III of France. The setting out in writing of the previous French common laws provided a basis of understanding for the Courts of Guernsey.

At the same time that France was consolidating its laws, Elizabeth I enquired about the laws and duties of the Channel Islands. The commissioners to Guernsey found certain faults, resulting in the laws being defined and L’Approbation des Lois being published. L'Approbation itself became Guernsey law by an Order in Council dated 27 October 1583. There were areas missed out and faults in this publication which were pointed out over the next century.

=== Influence of English and French law ===
One of the four French laws, canon law, seems to have been restricted after the Guernsey Martyrs were burned at the stake in 1556 for their Protestant faith and the death of Queen Mary two years later. The Ecclesiastical Court was revived in 1662 and still operates today.

Contract law was influenced by French law in the 18th century and then English law in the 19th century.

The French revolution of 1789 resulted in the Code Civil of 1804, which saw the end of French customary law. It has had some influence on Guernsey.

Some fields of Guernsey law, such as negligence and administrative law, are heavily influenced by English common law, especially during the 19th and 20th centuries. Laws affecting new areas, such as data protection or driving licences, tend to follow English law.

=== Influence of European law ===
Certain aspects of membership of the United Kingdom in the European Union apply to the Crown dependencies, by association of the United Kingdom's membership. The Islanders have no right of vote in the European Parliament, or in any of the United Kingdom Parliaments.

The European Communities (Implementation) (Bailiwick of Guernsey) Law 1994 gives Guernsey the right to implement provisions in European laws as it was decided that the laws of the Islands' neighbours should be taken into account.

Having accepted the European human rights laws, The Human Rights (Bailiwick of Guernsey) Law, 2000 was passed to allow people to claim their rights under the European Convention on Human Rights in the Island courts and tribunals, instead of having to go to the European Court in Strasbourg.

=== Language ===
French was the only official language of the Bailiwick, until 1948 when it changed to English. Some laws kept the old language for longer, for instance, all deeds for the sale and purchase of real estate in Guernsey were written in French until 1971.

=== Alderney ===
Alderney enjoys full autonomy in law (except in matters of foreign affairs and defence, as the other Channel Islands); however, in 1948 Alderney adopted a new constitution which created a fully elected government and changed the courts. Under the terms of an agreement (known as "the 1948 Agreement") entered into between the Government of Alderney and the Government of Guernsey, certain matters were delegated to Guernsey. These are known as "the transferred services" which include policing, customs and excise, airport operations, health, education and social services. In return for the cost of providing the transferred services, Guernsey has been permitted by Alderney to levies various taxes and duties on Alderney at the same rate as in Guernsey.

== Case law ==
Guernsey has a system of binding vertical precedent, unlike neighbouring Jersey. This originates from the case of Morton v Paint, which ruled that Privy Council decisions on Guernsey, but not on other jurisdictions, are binding on Guernsey's lower courts and decisions of the Court of Appeal are binding on the Royal Court, but not on itself. In other words, a court can bind lower courts, but cannot bind itself.

== Judiciary ==
The head of the judiciary in Guernsey is the Bailiff, who, as well as performing the judicial functions of a Chief Justice, is also the head of the States of Guernsey and has certain civic, ceremonial and executive functions. The Bailiff's functions may be exercised by the Deputy Bailiff. The posts of Bailiff and Deputy Bailiff are Crown appointments.

=== Jurats ===
Sixteen Jurats, who need no specific legal training, are elected by the States of Election from among Islanders. They act as a jury, and also as judges in civil and criminal cases. The Jurats fix the sentence in criminal cases. They also undertake a number of other duties. First mentioned in 1179, there is a list of Jurats who have served since 1299.

=== Judicial appointments ===
The Bailiff is, ex officio, a Judge of the Court of Appeal and the Court's president. He also sits as a single judge or presiding over a sitting with Jurats. The Deputy Bailiff undertakes judicial work and acts in situations when the Bailiff is not present.

=== Law Officers ===
The Law Officers of the Crown are responsible for criminal prosecution work and for providing legal advice to the Crown, ministers and other members of the States of Guernsey.

H.M. Procureur and the junior H.M. Comptroller hold office through Royal Warrants and both are Law Officers of the Crown. H.M. Procureur is responsible for providing legal advice to the Island Government.

H.M. Greffier and H.M. Sherriff provide specific duties to the Courts of recording and enforcing.

=== Legal aid ===
Legal aid, provided by the Guernsey Legal Aid Service, can provide access to free or reduced cost legal advice in criminal and civil cases.

== Legal profession ==
Advocates have rights of audience to represent clients in all courts.

The qualification route is commonly achieved through obtaining a Bachelor of Laws degree in England or Wales (or other commonwealth jurisdiction), then a qualification as a solicitor or barrister in England and Wales (or Scotland/ Northern Ireland), followed by vocational training, passing Guernsey Bar exams and then obtaining a Certificat d’Etudes Juridiques Françaises et Normandes from Caen University.

Solicitors and notaries have no rights of audience.

== Statutes ==
Guernsey normally passes between 30 and 50 new laws, or amendments to, or repeals of, laws each year.

The fastest law passed was almost certainly one in 1940, during German occupation, when, to avoid a Guernsey individual being prosecuted for saying something derogatory against the occupying Germans before a German military court, a law was passed within days and the person involved was prosecuted for an offence that had not been against the law when the crime was committed.

== See also ==
- List of laws of Guernsey
- Courts of Guernsey
- Law of Jersey
