= RNLB Sir William Arnold =

Former RNLI Lifeboat

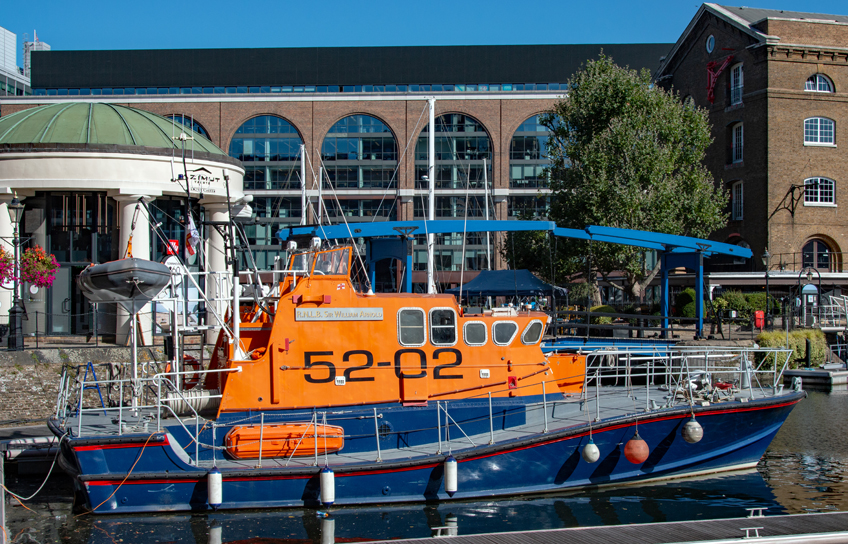
- RNLB Sir William Arnold in St Katherine Docks

History

British RNLI Flag
- Namesake: William Arnold
- Owner: Royal National Lifeboat Institution (RNLI)
- Builder: William Osborne of Littlehampton
- Official Number: ON 1025
- Station: St Peter Port (1974 – 1997)
- Cost: £100,000
- Laid down: 1973
- Launched: 1974
- Christened: 23 May 1974 by Duchess of Kent
- Completed: 1974
- Acquired: 1974
- Decommissioned: 1997
- Fate: Sold out of fleet in 1997 as leisure craft; acquired for independent lifeboat station in Blyth in 2014; acquired for restoration 2019

General characteristics
- Class & type: Arun-class
- Type: Motor lifeboat
- Displacement: 30 long tons (30 t)
- Length: 52 ft (16 m) overall
- Beam: 17 ft (5.2 m)
- Propulsion: 2 × Caterpillar 460 hp (343 kW) diesel engines
- Speed: 19.5 knots (36.1 km/h; 22.4 mph)
- Range: 250 nmi (460 km; 290 mi)
- Crew: 6

RNLB Sir William Arnold was an Arun-class lifeboat which served at Saint Peter Port Lifeboat Station in Guernsey from 1974 to 1997, and is now preserved at Gunwharf Quays in Portsmouth.

== Service history ==
The first Arun-class lifeboat was the Arun (ON 1018), built in 1971. She initially served in St Peter Port on evaluation trials, and from 1974 was based at Barry Dock Lifeboat Station. Arun had a high freeboard, which made recovering survivors from the water difficult. The second Arun lifeboat was the Sir William Arnold, which had a lower freeboard aft and had a redesigned wheelhouse. She also carried a smaller inflatable Y-class lifeboat.

The fundraising campaign for the new lifeboat was led by the Bailiff of Guernsey, Sir William Arnold. The lifeboat was built by Osbornes Boatyard in Littlehampton. Arnold died in 1973, before the lifeboat was brought into service, and she was named in his honour by the Duchess of Kent in 1974.

During her time in service, the Sir William Arnold embarked on more than 500 rescue missions and saved 224 lives. Her coxswains and crews were awarded 15 RNLI medals between them. Her most famous rescue was of 29 crew and members of their families from the MV Bonita on 13 December 1981 in hurricane conditions.

Sir William Arnold was replaced by a Severn-class lifeboat, the Spirit of Guernsey (ON 1203), in 1997.

== Disposal ==
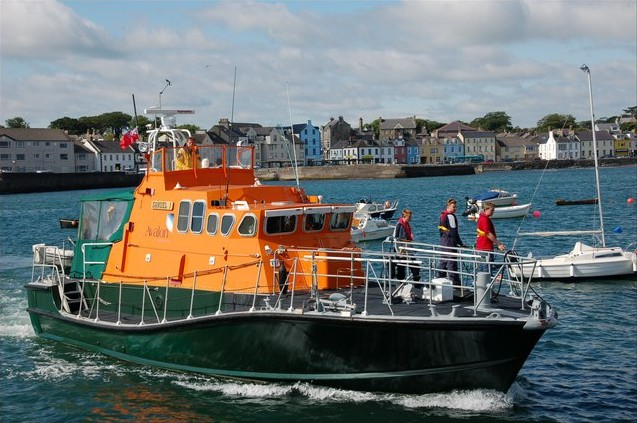
Samuel J at Donaghadee in 2007

After being sold in 1997, the Sir William Arnold was fitted out as a leisure craft and renamed Our Lady and then Theocrat. She was subsequently renamed the Samuel J in Ireland.

== Restoration ==
Colin Trowles acquired the Sir William Arnold in 2019 from Blyth volunteer lifeboat station (not Blyth Lifeboat Station), where she had been since 2014. After restoration, at Maldon in Essex, she was moved to St Katharine Docks in London as an educational museum, before being relocated to Heybridge Basin in Essex in 2023.

The Sir William Arnold is moored at Gunwharf Quay in Portsmouth and is regularly open to the public.

== Legacy ==
The Sir William Arnold was featured on the 25p stamp in a series of six Guernsey Post stamps issued in 1999 for the 175th Anniversary of the RNLI.
