= Thomas de Havilland =

- Born: April 1775
- Died: 23 February 1866 (aged 90)
- Citizenship: British
- Occupations: a British Army officer and engineer in the Madras Presidency
- Spouse(s): Cartaretta, daughter and heir of the Rev

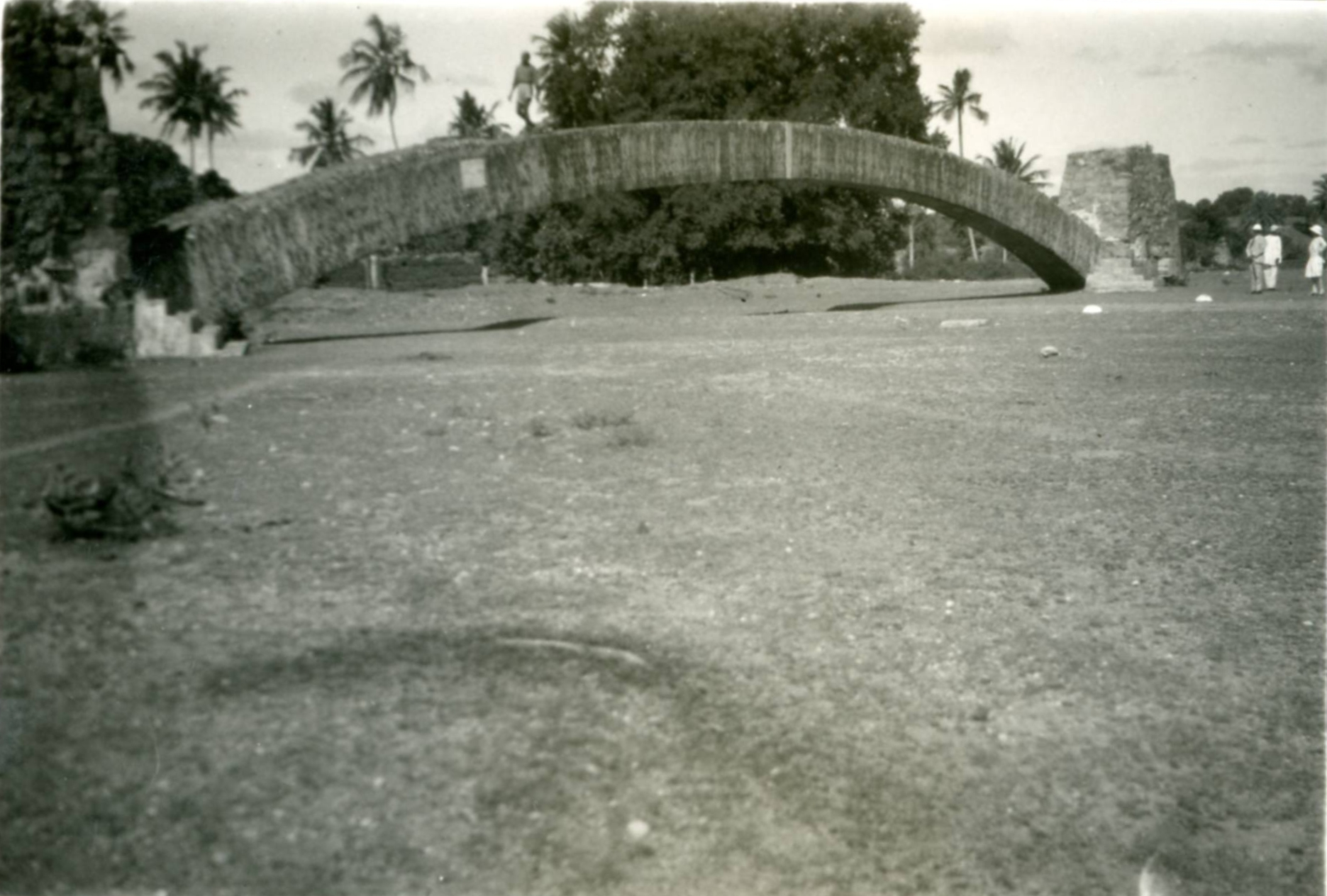
De Havilland's arch in Srirangapatnam, c. 1920

Lieutenant-Colonel Thomas Fiott de Havilland (April 1775 – 23 February 1866) was a British Army officer and engineer in the Madras Presidency. He later served as a justice and member of the legislature of Guernsey.

De Havilland was born in April 1775 at Havilland Hall, Guernsey, the son of Sir Peter de Havilland, Bailiff of Guernsey from 1810 to 1821, and his wife Cartaretta, daughter and heir of the Rev. Thomas Fiott. The family coat of arms includes three triple-turretted towers with the motto Dominus fortissima turris. De Havilland served in Colombo in 1795-96 alongside Colin Mackenzie, in Trichy against Tipu in 1799 and in Egypt in 1801 where he was captured by the French. He was released in 1802. In 1814 he was appointed civil engineer and architect for the Madras Presidency and remained in post until his retirement from the service in April 1825. He became chief engineer at Madras in 1821 and was promoted to lieutenant-colonel in 1824. He wrote a report on the roles of the Engineers, Pioneers, Sappers and Miners which drew much ire. He constructed a sea wall in Madras, designed and built St. Andrew's Church, and at Srirangapatnam he built a demonstration arch of 110 feet with ordinary bricks to support a proposal that a five arch bridge could be built across the Kaveri river. The arch collapsed in July 1936. At Madras he established a benchmark for the mean sea level.

After he retired de Havilland returned to Guernsey and bought the Vauxquiédor estate and became a justice and member of the legislature.

In 1808 he married Elizabeth Saumarez (1782-1818, Madras), daughter of Thomas Saumarez, and they had two sons (Thomas de Havilland, a captain in the 55th foot (d. 1843), and Charles Ross de Havilland, a clergyman, who also died before his father) and two daughters. After his return to England he married Harriet Gore in 1828. He died at Beauvoir, Guernsey, on 23 February 1866, at the age of 90.
