= Peter de Havilland =

Sir Peter de Havilland

Bailiff of Guernsey
- In office 1810–1821
- Preceded by: Robert Porrett le Marchant
- Succeeded by: Daniel de Lisle Brock

Personal details
- Born: 27 October 1747; St. Peter Port, Guernsey
- Died: April 1821 (aged 73)
- Relatives: de Havilland family

Sir Peter de Havilland (27 October 1747–April 1821) was a lawyer and member of the de Havilland family of Guernsey. He served as Bailiff of Guernsey from 1810 to 1821.

== Family and early life ==
De Havilland was born at Saint Peter Port, Guernsey, in 1747, the thirteenth child of John de Havilland (1706-1770), who was elected a jurat in 1729, and Mary, daughter of Peter Dobrée. The Dobrées were a wealthy Guernsey family, but Peter Dobrée had moved to London for business and it was there, at Clapham, that John de Havilland married Mary Dobrée in 1728.

John and Mary lived in a now-demolished house called La Bataille. Eight of their thirteen children survived to adulthood: Catherine, Mary, John, James, Martha, Eliza, Martin and Peter.

The language spoken at home was French, with English and Guernsey French also learnt by the children. Peter's sister Catherine married when he was just 1 year old, and his mother died in 1763 when he was 16.

== Adult life ==
At the age of 17, Peter de Havilland was sent to Cette on the Mediterranean coast of France, an important port for the wine trade, working with Marc Fraissinet, a local merchant with contracts to supply wines to the Dobrée and de Havilland families, to learn the trade. He returned to Guernsey after three years.

Deciding to train in law, a small profession at that time, with less than ten advocates in Guernsey, he spent a year as an observer at the Royal Court in La Plaiderie, Saint Peter Port, before being sworn in as an advocate in 1770, at the age of 23. He had not followed the usual path of studying French or Norman law at a university in France before setting up his legal business.

=== First marriage ===
De Havilland married Carterette Fiott, daughter of the Rev. Thomas Fiott and Mary le Marchant, in 1771, and had several children, including the army officer Thomas Fiott de Havilland.

There was ill will between de Havilland and a number of families in Guernsey related to him, including the Bailiff, William le Marchant, during the 1770s, resulting in a challenge to a duel, which did not take place, an exchange of public pamphlets and the resignation of de Havilland as an advocate in 1777.

=== Privateers ===
De Havilland invested in several privateers during the Anglo-French War (1778–1783), receiving £95 in 1778 and £173 in 1779 from a £50 investment in the Swallow whilst living in Exeter. Returning to Guernsey in 1781, he bought and renovated a house in the Rohais. His wife died in 1789.

In 1785 he was elected a jurat and within three years was at loggerheads with the Bailiff again, resulting in a number of complaints being sent to the Privy Council concerning the behavior of the Bailiff. A legal case by de Havilland against the Bailiff was refused leave to be heard by the court time and again, with proceedings becoming very aggressive, on one occasion the Bailiff drawing a knife and threatening one court official and threatening to shoot another. On another occasion, when the Bailiff locked the court building so that the case could not be heard, the jurats broke in, held the hearing, which was unopposed, and awarded de Havilland damages of £1,000. The Bailiff refused to pay, was fined £300 for assaulting a court official and sentenced to 15 days in prison.

In 1795 de Havilland was appointed superintendent of signals and made responsible for the thirteen newly built signal masts around the island, installed to give warning of approaching ships.

Investing in land near the Grange, he set out streets, naming them Havilland Street and Allez Street and selling off plots to builders from 1796 to construct houses. This was followed by Sausmarez Street, Union Street and St John Street.

=== Second marriage ===
De Havilland married his second wife, Emilia Tupper, in 1796. She was from a wealthy family and agreed that, if he predeceased her, she would not claim the widows’ portion of his estate. His standing in Guernsey continued to rise and he moved into a new house in Sausmarez Street.

William le Marchant, having resigned as Bailiff in 1800, arranged for his son Robert to be appointed in his stead. Robert fell ill in 1806 but it was not until 1810 that he resigned and Peter de Havilland was appointed Bailiff.

== Actions as Bailiff ==
A proposal from the Lieutenant Governor of Guernsey, Major-General Sir John Doyle, 1st Baronet, to construct two military roads to Rocquaine and Vazon was presented by de Havilland to the States of Guernsey, marking the start of several major road improvements on the island.

A personal claim against Durell Jeremie in 1803 over rent due to be paid as "quarters of wheat", for which de Havilland insisted on being paid in Guernsey-produced wheat, was eventually resolved in 1814 when the Privy Council decided it did not have to be "Guernsey" wheat, as Guernsey did not produce enough wheat to pay all the annual rents due in wheat.

De Havilland was not happy that the Bailiff's salary had not increased since 1331, being set at 30 Livre tournois per annum (around £2), and in 1812 he petitioned the Prince Regent, citing the annual fee of £300 paid to the Bailiff of Jersey. In 1813 the Privy Council agreed to the pay rise, also giving increases to the court officials, but faced opposition in Guernsey from those who considered the post an honorary one. The £300 was paid from 1815.

In 1814, on de Havilland's recommendation, the Privy Council gave permission for a duty (impôt) to be levied on alcohol to fund improvements on the island, again triggering opposition from local business people.

In 1817 de Havilland was knighted by the Prince Regent for services to Guernsey and for supporting the provision of improved military roads. He died in April 1821, aged 73.

== Descendants ==
Sir Peter de Havilland's descendants included the aviation pioneer Sir Geoffrey de Havilland and the actresses Olivia de Havilland and Joan Fontaine.

Legal offices
Preceded by Robert Porrett le Marchant	Bailiff of Guernsey; 1810 – 1821	Succeeded by Daniel de Lisle Brock
