= William Carey (bailiff) =

Bailiff of Guernsey from 1908 to 1915

Sir William Carey

Bailiff of Guernsey
- In office 1908 – 27 July 1915
- Preceded by: Henry Giffard
- Succeeded by: Edward Ozanne

Sir William Carey (1 February 1853 – 27 July 1915) was Bailiff of Guernsey from 1908 to 1915. He was educated at Elizabeth College and the University of Caen Normandy.
