= Geoffrey Rowland =

Bailiff of Guernsey (born 1948)

Sir Geoffrey Rowland KC

Bailiff of Guernsey
- In office June 2005 – March 2012
- Deputy: Richard Collas
- Preceded by: de Vic Carey
- Succeeded by: Richard Collas

Personal details
- Born: 1948 (age 77–78) Guernsey
- Children: 2
- Education: Elizabeth College; University of Southampton

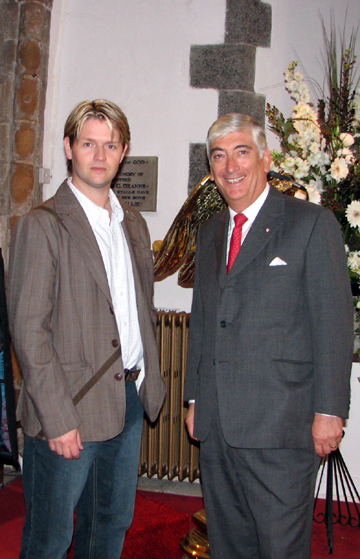
Sir Geoffrey Rowland (right)

Sir Geoffrey Robert Rowland (born 1948) was the Bailiff of Guernsey from 2005 to 2012.

== Life ==
Having studied law at the University of Southampton, graduating in 1969, Rowland was called to the English Bar at Gray's Inn in 1970 and admitted as an Advocate of the Royal Court, Guernsey, in 1971. He was in practice as an Advocate of the Royal Court in the firm of Collas, Day & Rowland 1971 - 1992. He was Vice Chairman of the Guernsey Financial Services Commission 1997 - 2002. He was then recommended for Crown Office and left private practice when Senior Partner.

He successively held office as Comptroller General (Solicitor General) 1992 - 1999, and Procureur (Attorney General) 1999 - 2002. He was appointed Queen's Counsel in 1993. He also held office as Receiver General 1999 - 2002.

Elevated to the Judiciary, he held the office of Deputy Bailiff 2002 - 2005 and was installed as the 88th Bailiff of Guernsey in June 2005. The Bailiff of Guernsey is ex-officio President of the Guernsey Court of Appeal. Geoffrey has also been a Judge of the Jersey Court of Appeal since 2005.

He became a Fellow of the Society of Advanced Legal Studies 2001 and Honorary Master of the Bench of Gray's Inn 2008. Honorary Doctorates of Laws were conferred by the University of Bournemouth (2006) and the University of Southampton (2009).

He held office as Provincial Grand Master, United Grand Lodge of Freemasons of England, 2000 - 2007. He is married to Diana, and they have two sons, Peter and John.

He received the honour of knighthood (Knight Bachelor) in the 2009 Birthday Honours.

Sir Geoffrey retired as Bailiff on 22 March 2012.

Legal offices
| Preceded by Sir de Vic Carey | Bailiff of Guernsey; 2005 – 2012 | Succeeded by Sir Richard Collas |
