= Richard Collas =

Bailiff of Guernsey (b. 1953)

Sir Richard Collas
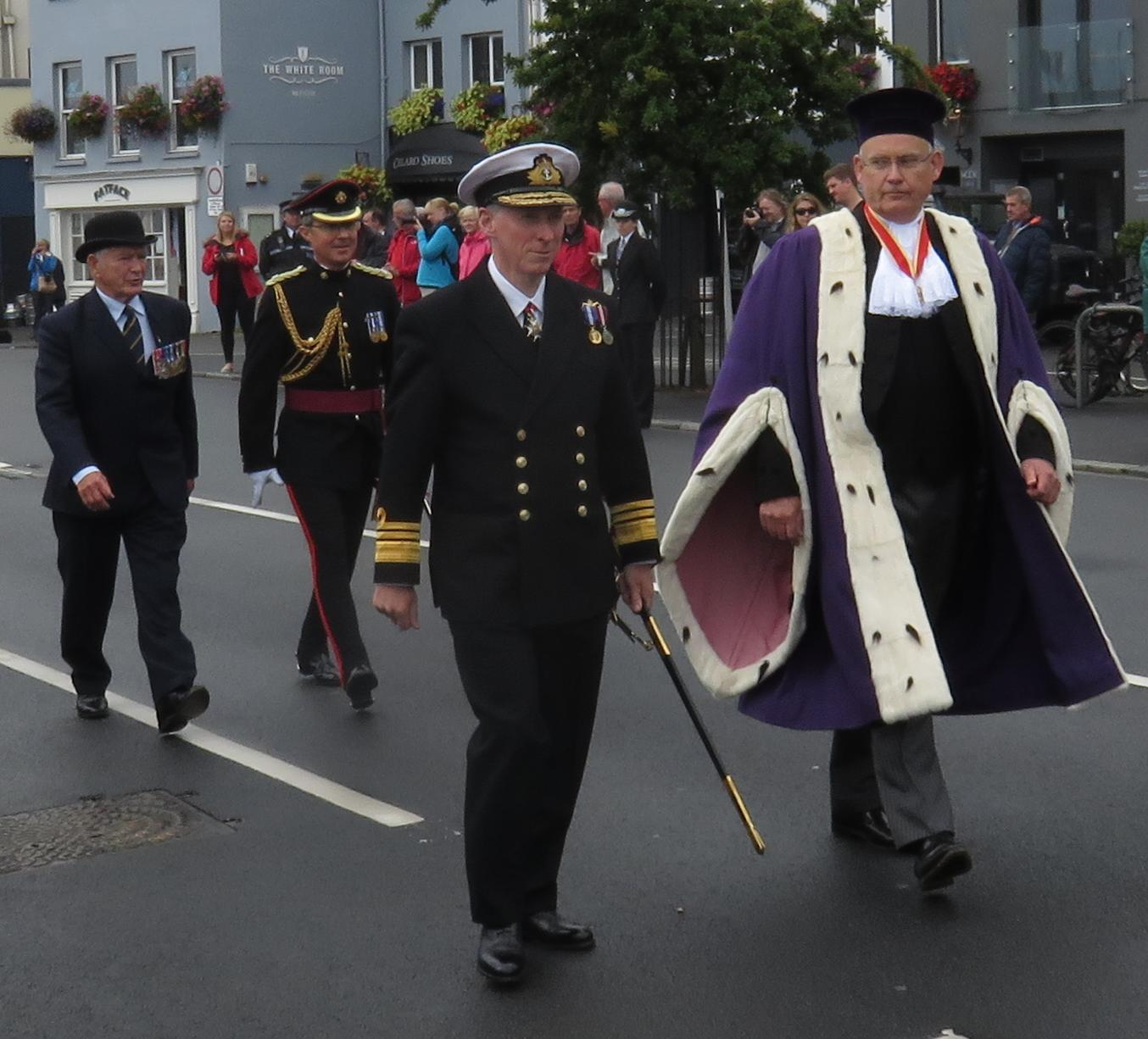
- Richard Collas (right) attending the Queen's birthday parade 2016 in St. Peter Port, Guernsey.

Bailiff of Guernsey
- In office March 2012 – May 2020
- Deputy: Richard McMahon
- Preceded by: Geoffrey Rowland
- Succeeded by: Richard McMahon

Personal details
- Born: 1953 (age 72–73)
- Children: 3
- Education: Elizabeth College; Jesus College, Oxford

Sir Richard Collas (born 1953) was Bailiff of Guernsey from 2012 until his retirement in 2020.

== Early life ==
He was educated at Elizabeth College, Guernsey, before he went on to study Engineering Science at Jesus College, Oxford. After studying engineering and accountancy, he moved to law in which he practised for a number of years before moving into the civic duty of Deputy Bailiff.

== Career ==
He joined Lever Brothers Limited before completed the exams for the Institute of Cost and Management Accountants then, in 1980, changed to Law as a profession.

Called to the English Bar at Gray's Inn in 1982 he returned to Guernsey to attend the University of Caen Normandy for the necessary Certificat d’Études Juridtiques Françaises et Normandes and the following year was admitted as a Royal Court Advocate. Joining his father's firm of Collas Day & Rowland, Advocates, he became a partner and continued to practise there until 2005.

Collas was appointed to the office of Deputy Bailiff 2005–2012. In March 2012 he was sworn in and became the 89th Bailiff of Guernsey, taking over the position of Bailiff from Sir Geoffrey Rowland.

The Bailiff of Guernsey is ex-officio President of the Guernsey Court of Appeal. Collas has been a member of the Court of Appeal of Jersey since 2012.

He was awarded a knighthood in June 2014 in the Queen's Birthday Honours list, receiving his knighthood as a Knight Bachelor of the British Empire at an investiture in Buckingham Palace the following November.

He became an Honorary Master of the Bench of The Honourable Society of Gray's Inn in 2015.

The Bailiff would normally retire at the age of 65; however, Her Majesty granted a two-year extension of the date to May 2020.

== Family ==
Sir Richard has three children, Jonathan, Oliver and Lydia.

== See also ==
- Courts of Guernsey
- List of bailiffs of Guernsey

Legal offices
Preceded by Geoffrey Rowland	Bailiff of Guernsey; 2012 – 2020	Succeeded by Richard McMahon
