= William Arnold (bailiff) =

Bailiff of Guernsey (1903–1973)

Sir William Arnold KBE

Bailiff of Guernsey
- In office 1960–1973
- Preceded by: Ambrose Sherwill
- Succeeded by: John Loveridge

Personal details
- Born: 5 August 1903; Guernsey, Channel Islands
- Died: 21 July 1973 (aged 69); Guernsey, Channel Islands

Sir William Henry Arnold KBE (5 August 1903 – 21 July 1973) was Bailiff of Guernsey from 1960 until his death in 1973.

== Early life ==
Arnold was born and educated on Guernsey. He was called to the English Bar in 1926 and the Guernsey Bar in 1927.

== Bailiff ==
Arnold was Procureur (attorney general) from 1946 to 1960 and was then appointed Bailiff in 1960. In 1964 he led the successful move in Guernsey to abolish the death penalty for murder. In 1966 a civil servant, Basil Torode, raised Clameur de Haro in the Guernsey Parliament in front of Arnold, leading to an uproar in the house.

He was active in the fundraising efforts for a new Arun-class lifeboat for the Saint Peter Port Lifeboat Station. He died before the new boat could be commissioned, and she was named Sir William Arnold in his honour.

He was made CBE in the 1955 Queen's Birthday Honours, knighted in the 1963 New Year Honours and made KBE in the 1973 Birthday Honours.

== Personal life ==
Arnold died in office, just before his 70th birthday. The National Portrait Gallery holds a photograph of Arnold by Walter Bird.

Legal offices
Preceded by Sir Ambrose Sherwill	Bailiff of Guernsey; 1960–1973	Succeeded by Sir John Loveridge
