= Graham Dorey =

Bailiff of Guernsey (1932 – 2015)

Sir Graham Dorey

Bailiff of Guernsey
- In office February 1992 – March 1999
- Preceded by: Charles Frossard
- Succeeded by: de Vic Carey

Personal details
- Born: 15 December 1932
- Died: 25 June 2015 (aged 82)
- Children: 4
- Education: University of Bristol; École des Roches

Sir Graham Martyn Dorey (15 December 1932 – 25 June 2015) was Bailiff of Guernsey from February 1992 to March 1999.

== Biography ==
The second son of a local grower, Martyn Dorey, he was evacuated to Scotland during World War II. He was educated at Kingswood School Bath, University of Bristol, and then Ecole des Roches Verneuil in Caen in 1959; he was made an Advocate of the Royal Court of Guernsey in1960.

Whilst in office as Bailiff of Guernsey he oversaw the response to territorial fishing disputes with French fishermen within the Gulf of St Malo. He did not open public buildings in his name, however while Deputy Bailiff he campaigned for a Guernsey Flag, and chaired the Guernsey Flag Committee.

Both he and his wife Penelope supported local causes. Lady Penelope died of cancer during her husband's term of office in September 1996; she received a public funeral. The couple had four children: Suzanne, Jane, Robert and Martyn. In August 1998, Sir Graham married Cicely Ruth Lummis, a widow.

Legal offices
Preceded by Sir Charles Frossard	Bailiff of Guernsey; 1992 – 1999	Succeeded by Sir de Vic Carey
