= 2022 Alderney plebiscite election =

The 2022 Alderney plebiscite election was held on 10 December 2022 to elect 2 members to be nominated to represent Alderney in the States of Guernsey.

== Results ==
Candidate	Votes	%
Alexander Snowdon	339	45.75
Steve Roberts	278	37.52
Bruce Woodhead	124	16.73
Total	741	100.00
Valid votes	401	99.50
Invalid/blank votes	2	0.50
Total votes	403	100.00
Registered voters/turnout		30%
