= Charles Frossard (bailiff) =

Bailiff of Guernsey from 1982 to 1992

Sir Charles Frossard KBE

Bailiff of Guernsey
- In office 1982–1992
- Preceded by: John Loveridge
- Succeeded by: Graham Dorey

Personal details
- Born: 18 February 1922
- Died: 15 July 2012 (aged 90)
- Spouse: Elizabeth Martel (m. 1950)
- Children: 2
- Parent: Edward Frossard (father)
- Education: University of Caen Normandy

Military service
- Allegiance: United Kingdom
- Branch/service: British Army; Indian Army
- Rank: Captain
- Unit: Gordon Highlanders; Black Watch
- Battles/wars: World War II

Sir Charles Keith Frossard (18 February 1922 – 15 July 2012) was a Guernsey politician who served as Bailiff of Guernsey from 1982 to 1992.

== Early life ==
Charles Keith Frossard was born on 18 February 1922; his father, Edward Frossard, was a priest who served as the Dean of Guernsey from 1947 to 1967.

Frossard was educated at Elizabeth College, following which he began studying at the University of Caen in Normandy until the German invasion of France in 1940, when he fled to England. Subsequently, Frossard enlisted in the Gordon Highlanders (later transferring to the Black Watch and the Indian Army) and served in the North West Frontier from 1942 to 1946, earning the rank of captain. During this time, he befriended mountaineer Tenzing Norgay. Following the end of World War II, he returned to Caen and resumed his studies. In 1949, he began practise as an advocate, having attended Gray's Inn and passing fourth in the bar finals.

== Career ==
Frossard began his career in public service in 1958 when he was elected as a deputy for Saint Peter Port in the States of Guernsey. Later representing Saint Sampson, he served as a deputy for three terms. In 1967, he was elected Conseiller (serving until 1969) and became the president of the Advisory and Finance Committee. He later held the posts of HM Comptroller (1969–73) and HM Procureur (Note: Equivalent to attorney general.) (1973–77).

In 1977, he became deputy bailiff of Guernsey, and five years later became bailiff, serving for ten years until his retirement from the role. Until 1995, he remained a judge with the Channel Islands Court of Appeal.

== Personal life ==
From 1960 to 1982, Frossard was a member of the General Synod of the Church of England. He later served as president of the Indian Army Association from 1993 and Grand Master of the Guernsey Freemasons from 1995. He enjoyed scrambles in the Pyrenees and rifle shooting.

Frossard had two daughters with his wife, Elizabeth "Betty" Frossard (née Martel). The couple married in 1950 at the Town Church in Guernsey.

== Recognition ==
Frossard was knighted in the 1983 Birthday Honours, made a Knight of Justice of the Most Venerable Order of the Hospital of Saint John of Jerusalem in 1985, and appointed Knight Commander in the 1992 New Year Honours. He was awarded the title of doctor honoris causa by the University of Caen on 23 January 1990 and is the eponym of Sir Charles Frossard House (also known as Custard Castle by locals), a government office in Guernsey that opened in January 1993.

=== National honours ===
Ribbon	Honour	Date
	Knight Bachelor	1983
	Knight of Justice of the Most Venerable Order of the Hospital of Saint John of Jerusalem	1985
	Knight Commander of the Most Excellent Order of the British Empire	1992

== Death ==
On 15 July 2012, Charles Frossard died at the age of ninety. Offering his condolences to the family of Sir Charles, then-bailiff Richard Collas stated, "Guernsey has lost a most distinguished son, who enjoyed an extraordinary lifetime of remarkable achievements."

== Notes ==
Legal offices
Preceded by Sir John Loveridge	Bailiff of Guernsey; 1982 – 1992	Succeeded by Sir Graham Dorey
