= States of Election =

The States of Election has only one purpose, to elect a new Jurat to the Courts in Guernsey.

The first record of a Jurat in Guernsey was in 1179, and a roll of honour listing Jurats since 1299 is in the Royal Court.

A Royal Commission of 1607 identified a body of "...the Bailiff and Jurats, with the Constables and Dozens of every parish" to elect the Jurats of the Royal Court. In the 1770s, the term States of Election was used.

== Election process ==
A prospective candidate must be proposed and seconded. Only someone receiving over 50% of votes cast at the secret ballot can be elected.

Originally, if elected, the duty was for life. In 1950, this was changed to retirement at 70, with the possibility of an extension to 75; this was changed again in 2008, to retirement at 70 with an extension to 72 possible, while the number of Jurats was increased from 12 to 16.

Only one vacancy may be filled at any one meeting of the States of Election.

The duty is unpaid and each person voting should do so based on their conscience.

Election as a Jurat is the highest honour that Guernsey can confer on a resident of the Island.

== 1948 ==
The Reform (Guernsey) Law, 1948, as amended set out the constitution of the election committee:

- The Bailiff
- The Jurats (12 originally, 16 from 2008)
- The Rectors of the parish churches (10) (or Priests-in-Charge from 1984)
- H. M. Procureur
- H. M. Comptroller
- The People's Deputies (45 originally, 38 from 2016)
- 34 Douzaine Representatives, elected by the Douzaines as follows:

- 9 from St. Peter Port
- 5 from St. Sampson
- 5 from the Castel
- 5 from the Vale
- 4 from St. Martin
- 2 from St. Saviour
- 1 from St. Andrew
- 1 from St. Pierre du Bois
- 1 from the Forest
- 1 from Torteval

The Reform (Guernsey) (Amendment) Law, 2003 permits changes to the number of Douzaine representatives if the population of parishes change. The Royal Court (Reform) Law 2008 made it possible for new Jurats to retire at 72 and for the number of Jurats to increase to 16. It also created the position of 'Juré-Justicier Suppléant'.

== Conseillers ==
The States of Election used to elect twelve Conseillers, each serving six-year terms, to sit in the States of Deliberation. When constituted for this purpose, Alderney was entitled to send four members to sit in the States of Election. The 1994 election saw Conseillers elected by popular vote, thus removing this function of the States of Election, which was maintained until their abolition in 2000.

== See also ==
- Courts of Guernsey
- Electoral College
