= 2022 Sark general election =

General elections were due to be held in Sark on 14 December 2022. However, only 5 candidates were nominated for the 9 seats available in the Chief Pleas, meaning that all were elected unopposed for a four-year term, without a public vote being required.

== Results ==
Only 5 candidates vied and were elected unopposed for the 9 available seats, meaning a by-election was due to take place in March 2023 to fill the 4 vacant seats.

- Jolie Claire Booth
- John David Guille
- Christopher Kennedy-Barnard
- Andrew Henry Benedict Miller
- Helen Mildred Plummer

On 15 March 2023 a by election was held to fill the 4 vacant seats, but only two candidates stood, so were duly appointed, leaving two seats still vacant.

- Marcus James Thorpe Barker
- Scott Sullivan
