= Richard McMahon (bailiff) =

British barrister (born 1962)

His Excellency Sir Richard McMahon

Bailiff of Guernsey
- In office 11 May 2020 – 1 September 2026
- Deputy: Jessica Roland
- Preceded by: Richard Collas
- Succeeded by: Jessica Roland

Personal details
- Born: 1962 (age 63–64)
- Spouse: Sue-Yin (m. 1998)
- Children: 2
- Education: Abingdon School; University of Liverpool; Emmanuel College, Cambridge; Inns of Court School of Law; Université de Caen

Sir Richard James McMahon (born 1962) is a British barrister who has served as Bailiff of Guernsey from 2020 to 2026.

== Early life ==
Born in 1962, McMahon was educated at Abingdon School from 1973 to 1980, before he went to study Law at the University of Liverpool and University of Cambridge (Emmanuel College). He studied further at the Inns of Court School of Law in London and the Université de Caen in France.

== Career ==
McMahon was called to the English Bar, Middle Temple in 1986 and lectured in law at the University of Reading from 1987 to 1995. He became a Guernsey barrister in 1998 before being appointed a Crown Advocate in 2008. The following year he was appointed Solicitor General and Queen's Counsel.

McMahon was appointed to the office of Deputy Bailiff of Guernsey in 2012.

In May 2020 McMahon was sworn in and became the 90th Bailiff of Guernsey, taking over the office of Bailiff from Sir Richard Collas.

McMahon was knighted in the 2023 Birthday Honours for services to the Crown and the community in the Bailiwick of Guernsey.

McMahon announced in May 2026 that he will retire as Bailiff of Guernsey on 31 August 2026, after six years in office and upon reaching the retirement age of 65, he described the role as "the highest honour" of his career. He will be succeeded as Bailiff by Jessica Roland, Guernsey's first female Bailiff.

== Personal life ==
In 1998, McMahon married Sue-Yin. Together, they have two children.

== See also ==
- Courts of Guernsey
- List of bailiffs of Guernsey

Legal offices
Preceded by Sir Richard Collas	Bailiff of Guernsey; 2020 –	Incumbent
