= List of laws of Guernsey =

This is an incomplete list of Laws, Ordinances and Orders in Council of the States of Guernsey.

Guernsey passes between 30 and 60 laws a year.

== 20th century ==
=== 1935 ===
- Registration of Births and Deaths (Guernsey) Law, 1935

=== 1939 ===
- Matrimonial Causes (Guernsey) Law 1939

=== 1948 ===
- Interpretation (Guernsey) Law, 1948
- Reform (Guernsey) Law, 1948

=== 1952 ===
- Saisie Procedure (Simplification) (Bailiwick of Guernsey) Order, 1952

=== 1954 ===
- Stay of Evictions (Amendment) Law, 1954

=== 1961 ===
- Court of Appeal (Guernsey) Law, 1961

=== 1963 ===
- Offences against Police Officers (Bailiwick of Guernsey) Law, 1963

=== 1964 ===
- Court of Appeal (Civil Division) (Guernsey) Rules, 1964

=== 1966 ===
- Husband and Wife (Joint Accounts) (Guernsey) Law, 1966
- Island Development (Guernsey) Law, 1966

=== 1969 ===
- Court of Alderney (Appeals) Law, 1969
- Trusts (Guernsey) Law, 1969

=== 1972 ===
- Customs and Excise (General Provisions) (Bailiwick of Guernsey) Law, 1972

=== 1973 ===
- European Communities (Bailiwick of Guernsey) Law, 1973

=== 1974 ===
- Misuse of Drugs (Bailiwick of Guernsey) Law, 1974

=== 1975 ===
- Income Tax (Guernsey) Law, 1975

=== 1979 ===
- Law of Property (Miscellaneous Provisions) (Guernsey) Law, 1979
- Law Reform (Tort) (Guernsey) Law, 1979

=== 1982 ===
- Arbitration (Guernsey) Law 1982

=== 1985 ===
- Preuves, Loi relative aux 1985

=== 1986 ===
- The Census Ordinance, 1986
- The Public Transport (Guernsey) Law, 1984 (Commencement) Ordinance, 1986
- The Public Transport Ordinance, 1986
- The Road Traffic (Permits to Drive Public Service Vehicles) Ordinance, 1986
- The Impôts (Budget) Ordinance, 1986
- The Vehicle Noises etc. Ordinance, 1986
- The Mooring Charges (Amendment) (Guernsey) Ordinance, 1986

=== 1987 ===
- The Income Tax (Guernsey) (Settlements) Ordinance, 1987
- The Pilotage Dues and Fees Ordinance, 1987
- The Harbours, Moorings and Pilotage (Fees and Dues) Law, 1986 (Commencement) Ordinance, 1987
- The Health and Safety at Work (General)(Ordinance), 1987
- Law Reform (Miscellaneous Provisions) (Guernsey) Law, 1987
- Real Property (Reform) (Guernsey) Law, 1987

=== 1988 ===
- The Electoral Expenditure (People's Deputies) Ordinance, 1988
- The Electoral Expenditure (Constables and Douzeniers) Ordinances, 1988
- The Fishing (Amendment) Ordinance, 1988
- Domestic Proceedings and Magistrate's Court (Guernsey) Law, 1988

=== 1989 ===
- The Liquor Licensing (Amendment) Ordinance, 1989
- The Drug Trafficking Offences (Bailiwick of Guernsey) Law, 1988 (Commencement) Ordinance, 1989
- The Bank Holidays (Amendment) (Guernsey) Ordinance, 1989
- Curatelle Rules 1989
- Fire Services (Guernsey) Law, 1989
- Fishing (Bailiwick of Guernsey) Law, 1989
- Parole Review Committee (Guernsey) Law, 1989
- Royal Court Civil Rules, 1989
- Trusts (Guernsey) Law, 1989

=== 1990 ===
- The Foreshore (Riding and Driving) (Amendment) Ordinance, 1990
- The Gambling (Channel Islands Lottery) (Bailiwick of Guernsey) (Amendment) Ordinance, 1990
- Housing (Control of Occupation)(Amendment)(Guernsey), 1990
- Right to Work (Limitation and Proof)(Guernsey) Law, 1990

=== 1991 ===
- The Parole Review Committee Ordinance, 1991
- The Companies Law (Commencement) Ordinance, 1991
- The Births, Deaths and Marriage (Fees) (Amendment) Ordinance, 1991
- Criminal Justice (Fraud Investigation) (Bailiwick of Guernsey) Law 1991

=== 1992 ===
- The Income Tax (Forms of Oath) Ordinance, 1992
- The Income Tax (Settlements) (Guernsey) Ordinance, 1992
- The Marriage Fees (Amendment) Ordinance, 1992

=== 1993 ===
- The Water Charges (Amendment) Ordinance, 1993
- The Vehicular Traffic (Control of Parking on certain States Land) (Amendment) Ordinance, 1993
- The Prohibited and One-way Streets (Amendment) Ordinance, 1993
- Rent Control (Amendment)(Guernsey) Law, 1993
- Security Interests (Guernsey) Law, 1993

=== 1994 ===
- The Public Holidays Ordinance, 1994
- The Housing (Control of Occupation) (Variation of Schedules) Ordinance, 1994
- The Special Constabulary (Amendment) (No. 2) Ordinance, 1993
- Housing (Control of Occupation)(Guernsey) Law, 1994
- European Communities (Implementation) (Bailiwick of Guernsey) Law 1994
- Ecclesiastical Court (Jurisdiction) (Bailiwick of Guernsey) Law, 1994

=== 1995 ===
- The Income Tax (Exempt Bodies: Guernsey Limited Partnerships) Ordinance, 1995
- The Patents, Designs & Trade Marks (Amendment) Ordinance, 1995
- The Post Office Board (Chief Executive) Ordinance, 1995
- Partnership (Guernsey) Law, 1995

=== 1996 ===
- The Food and Drugs (Amendment) (Guernsey) Law, 1995 (Commencement) Ordinance, 1996
- The Food and Drugs (Emergency Prohibition Notice) (Maximum Compensation) Ordinance, 1996
- The Alderney (Application of Legislation) (Food and Drugs) Ordinance, 1996
- The Royal Bank of Scotland (Bailiwick of Guernsey) Law, 1995, (Commencement) Ordinance, 1996
- The Limited Partnerships (Guernsey) Law, 1995 (Commencement) Ordinance, 1996
- The Income Tax (Exempt Bodies: Limited Partnerships) Ordinance, 1996
- Fishing (Sark) Ordinance, 1996

=== 1997 ===
- The Employers’ Liability (Compulsory Insurance) (Subsidiary Companies) Ordinance, 1997
- The Housing (Control of Occupation) (Amendment of Housing Register) Ordinance, 1997
- The Magistrate's Court and Miscellaneous Reforms (Guernsey) Law, 1996 (Commencement) (No. 2) Ordinance 1997
- The Sale of Tobacco (Amendment) Ordinance, 1997
- The Protected Cell Companies Ordinance, 1997
- Amalgamation of Companies Ordinance, 1997
- Migration of Companies Ordinance, 1997

=== 1998 ===
- The Health Service (Physiotherapy Benefit) Ordinance, 1997
- The Alderney (Application of Legislation) (Health Service) (Benefit) (Amendment) Ordinance, 1997
- The By-elections Ordinance, 1998
- Housing (Control of Occupation)(Amendment)(Guernsey) Law, 1998
- Employment Protection (Guernsey) Law, 1998

=== 1999 ===
- The Public (Highways (Temporary Closure) Ordinance, 1999
- The Gambling (Betting) (Amendment) Ordinance, 1999
- The Road Traffic (Speed Limits and Trials) (Amendment) Ordinance, 1999
- The Transfrontier Shipment of Waste Ordinance, 1999
- The Firearms (Guernsey) Law, 1998 (Commencement) Ordinance, 1999
- Criminal Justice (Proceeds of Crime) (Bailiwick of Guernsey) Law, 1999

== 21st century ==
=== 2000 ===
- The Alderney (Application of Legislation) (Child Protection) Ordinance, 2000
- The Electoral expenditure Ordinance, 2000
- The Driving Tests and Driving Licences (Increase of Fees) Ordinance, 2000
- The Supplementary Benefit (Implementation) (Amendment) Ordinance, 2000
- The Data Protection (Office of Commissioner) Ordinance, 2000
- The Human Rights (Bailiwick of Guernsey) Law, 2000
- The Landmines Act 1998 (Guernsey) Order 2000

=== 2001 ===
- Data Protection (Bailiwick of Guernsey) Law, 2001
- Electricity (Guernsey) Law, 2001
- Electricity (Guernsey) Law, 2001 (Commencement and Amendment) Ordinance, 2001
- Housing (Control of Occupation)(Amendment)(Guernsey) Law, 2001
- Post Office (Bailiwick of Guernsey) Law, 2001
- Post Office (Bailiwick of Guernsey) Law, 2001 (Commencement) Ordinance, 2001
- Post Office (Bailiwick of Guernsey) (Amendment) Ordinance, 2001
- Regulation of Utilities (Bailiwick of Guernsey) Law, 2001
- States Trading Companies (Bailiwick of Guernsey) Law, 2001
- States Trading Companies (Bailiwick of Guernsey) Ordinance, 2001
- Telecommunications (Bailiwick of Guernsey) Law, 2001
- Telecommunications (Bailiwick of Guernsey) Law, 2001 (Commencement) Ordinance, 2001
- Transfer of States Undertakings (Protection of Employment) (Guernsey) Law, 2001
- The Limited Partnerships (Guernsey) (Amendment) Law, 1997 (Commencement) Ordinance 2001

=== 2002 ===
- Criminal Evidence and Miscellaneous Provisions (Bailiwick of Guernsey) Law, 2002
- Rehabilitation of Offenders (Bailiwick of Guernsey) Law, 2002
- States Trading Companies (Bailiwick of Guernsey) (Amendment) Ordinance, 2002

=== 2003 ===
- States Audit Commission (Guernsey) (Amendment) Ordinance 2003
- The European Communities (Implementation of Council Regulation for Control of Exports of Dual-Use Items) (Guernsey) Ordinance 2003
- Sea Fish Licensing (Guernsey) Ordinance, 2003
- Control of Borrowing (Bailiwick of Guernsey) (Amendment) Ordinance, 2003
- Feudal Dues (General Abolition of Congé) (Guernsey) Law, 2002 (Commencement) Ordinance, 2003
- Document Duty Ordinance, 2003
- Long-term Care Insurance (Guernsey) (Rates and Transitional Provisions) Ordinance, 2003
- Supplementary Benefit (Implementation) (Amendment) Ordinance, 2003
- Bar (Amendment) Ordinance, 2003
- Health Service (Benefit) (Amendment) Ordinance, 2003
- Water Byelaws (Guernsey) Ordinance, 2003
- By-election (Vale) Ordinance, 2003
- Liquor Licensing (Amendment) Ordinance, 2003
- Reform (Guernsey) (Amendment) Law, 2003 (Commencement) Ordinance, 2003
- Housing (Control of Occupation) (Amendment of Housing Register) Ordinance, 2003
- Guernsey Gambling Control Commission (Casino Gaming) (Fees) Ordinance, 2003
- Harbours (Amendment) Ordinance, 2003
- European Communities (Bailiwick of Guernsey) (Amendment) Ordinance, 2003
- By-election (Saint Sampson) Ordinance, 2003
- Social Insurance (Rates of Contributions and Benefits, etc.) Ordinance, 2003
- Police Powers and Criminal Evidence (Bailiwick of Guernsey) Law, 2003

=== 2004 ===
- Housing (Control of Occupation) (Suspension of Provisions of Section 65) Ordinance, 2004
- Health Service (Benefit) (Amendment) (No. 3) Ordinance, 2003
- Reform (Amendment) (Guernsey) Law, 1972 (Amendment) Ordinance, 2004
- Regulation of Investigatory Powers (Bailiwick of Guernsey) Law, 2003 (Commencement) Ordinance, 2004
- Burma (Export of Goods and Freezing of Funds) (Amendment) Ordinance, 2004
- The Elections Ordinance, 2004 - 2004 Guernsey general election
- Police Powers and Criminal Evidence (Bailiwick of Guernsey) Law, 2003 (Commencement) Ordinance, 2004
- Bail (Bailiwick of Guernsey) Law, 2003, (Commencement) Ordinance, 2004
- Notice of Smoking in Public Places Ordinance, 2004
- Sale of Tobacco (Amendment) Ordinance, 2004
- States Housing (Tenancies, Rent and Rebate Scheme)(Guernsey) Law, 2004
- States Housing (Tenancies, Rent and Rebate Scheme)(Guernsey) Law, 2004 (Consolidated Text)

=== 2005 ===
- The Burma (Sale, Supply, Export, Technical Assistance, Financing and Financial Assistance and Shipment of Equipment) (Penalties and Licences) (Guernsey) (Amendment) Ordinance, 2004
- The Bar (Amendment) Ordinance, 2005
- The States Housing (Termination of Tenancies) (Guernsey) Ordinance, 2005

=== 2006 ===
- Companies (Fees and Penalties) Ordinance, 2006
- Companies (Purchase of Own Shares) (Treasury Shares) Ordinance, 2006
- Housing (Control of Occupation)(Guernsey)(Amendment) Law, 2006
- Incorporated Cell Companies Ordinance, 2006
- Protected Cell Companies (Amendment) Ordinance, 2006
- Criminal Justice (Miscellaneous Provisions) (Bailiwick of Guernsey) Law 2006

=== 2007 ===
- The Motor Tax (Abolition) (Guernsey) Ordinance, 2006
- The European Communities (Bailiwick of Guernsey) (Amendment) Ordinance, 2006
- The Regulation of Utilities (Bailiwick of Guernsey) Ordinance, 2007
- The Registered Plant Breeders’ Rights (Bailiwick of Guernsey) Ordinance, 2007

=== 2008 ===
- The Income Tax (Tax Relief on Interest Payments) (Guernsey) Ordinance, 2007
- The Financial Services Commission (Site Visits) (Bailiwick of Guernsey) Ordinance, 2008
- The Migration of Companies (Amendment) Ordinance, 2008
- The Amalgamation of Companies (Amendment) Ordinance, 2008
- The Protected Cell Companies (Amendment) Ordinance, 2008
- The Royal Court (Reform) Law 2008
- The Incorporated Cell Companies (Amendment) Ordinance, 2008
- Children (Guernsey and Alderney) Law 2008
- Companies (Guernsey) Law 2008

=== 2009 ===
- The Registered Patents and Biotechnological Inventions (Bailiwick of Guernsey) Ordinance, 2009
- The Income Tax (Guernsey) (Approval of Agreements) Ordinance, 2009
- The Guernsey Bar (Bailiwick of Guernsey) (Commencement) Ordinance, 2009
- The Merchant Shipping (Bailiwick of Guernsey) Law, 2002 (Commencement) Ordinance, 2009
- The Aviation (Bailiwick of Guernsey) Law, 2008 (Commencement) Ordinance, 2009
- The Aviation (Foreign Aircraft Operations) (Bailiwick of Guernsey) Ordinance, 2009

=== 2010 ===
- Income Tax (Guernsey) (Approval of Agreement with Australia) Ordinance, 2010
- Data Protection (Bailiwick of Guernsey) (Amendment) Ordinance, 2010
- Milk (Control) (Guernsey) (Amendment) Ordinance, 2010
- Vehicular Traffic (Amendment) Ordinance, 2010
- Driving Licences (Guernsey) (Amendment) Ordinance, 2010

=== 2011 ===
- Income Tax (Guernsey) (Approval of Agreements with San Marino, Greece and China) Ordinance, 2011
- Iran (Restrictive Measures) (Guernsey) Ordinance, 2010
- Foreign Tax (Retention Arrangements) (Guernsey and Alderney) (Amendment) Ordinance, 2010
- Fees, Charges and Penalties (Guernsey) (Amendment) Ordinance, 2010
- Machinery of Government (Transfer of Functions) (Guernsey) Ordinance, 2011
- The Electoral Roll Ordinance, 2011

=== 2012 ===
- The Income Tax (Guernsey) (Approval of Agreements with the Czech Republic and Slovenia) Ordinance, 2012
- The Terrorist Asset-Freezing (Bailiwick of Guernsey) Law, 2011 (Commencement) Ordinance, 2012
- The Animal Welfare (Guernsey) Ordinance, 2012
- The Housing (Control of Occupation) (Amendment of Housing Register) Ordinance, 2012
- The Inheritance (Guernsey) Law, 2011 (Commencement) Ordinance, 2012

=== 2013 ===
- The Income Tax (Guernsey) (Approval of Agreement with Malta) Ordinance, 2013
- The Civil Contingencies Law, 2012 (Commencement) (Bailiwick of Guernsey) Ordinance, 2013
- The Civil Contingencies Authority (Form of Oath and Affirmation) (Bailiwick of Guernsey) Ordinance, 2013
- The Merchant Shipping (Bailiwick of Guernsey) Law, 2002, (Commencement) Ordinance, 2013
- The Smoking (Prohibition in Public Places and Workplaces) (Exemptions and Notices) (Amendment) (Guernsey) Ordinance, 2013
- The Income Tax (Guernsey) (Approval of Agreement with Chile) Ordinance, 2013
- The Control of Borrowing (Repeal) (Bailiwick of Guernsey) Ordinance, 2013
- The Income Tax (Zero 10) (Company Intermediate Rate) (Amendment) (Guernsey) Ordinance, 2012
- The Mental Health (Bailiwick of Guernsey) Law, 2010 (Commencement) Ordinance, 2013
- The Criminal Justice (Miscellaneous Provisions) (Bailiwick of Guernsey) (Amendment) Ordinance, 2013
- The Rehabilitation of Offenders (Bailiwick of Guernsey) (Amendment) Ordinance, 2013
- The Egypt (Freezing of Funds) (Guernsey) (Amendment) Ordinance, 2013
- The Iran (Restrictive Measures) (Guernsey) (Amendment) Ordinance, 2013
- The Tunisia (Freezing of Funds) (Guernsey) (Amendment) Ordinance, 2013
- The Income Tax (Guernsey) (Approval of Agreements with Brazil, Isle of Man, Jersey, Mauritius and Singapore) Ordinance, 2013
- The Mental Health (Miscellaneous Provisions) (Guernsey and Alderney) Ordinance, 2013
- The Income Tax (Guernsey) (Approval of Agreement with Qatar) Ordinance, 2013
- The North Korea (Restrictive Measures) (Guernsey) (Amendment) Ordinance, 2013
- The Supplementary Benefit (Classes of persons to whom the Law applies) (Amendment) Ordinance, 2013
- The Employment Agencies (Enabling Provisions) (Bailiwick of Guernsey) Law, 2012 (Commencement) (Guernsey and Alderney) Ordinance, 2013
- The Foreign Tax (Retention Arrangements) (Guernsey and Alderney) (Amendment) Ordinance, 2013
- The Myanmar/Burma (Restrictive Measures) (Guernsey) Ordinance, 2013
- The Income Tax (Guernsey) (Approval of Agreements with Botswana, British Virgin Islands, Hong Kong, Lesotho, Lithuania and Luxembourg) Ordinance, 2013
- The Libya (Restrictive Measures) (Guernsey) (Amendment) Ordinance, 2013 The Document Duty (Amendment) Ordinance, 2013 XXV
- The Excise Duties (Budget) Ordinance, 2013
- The Property Tax (Rates) (Guernsey and Alderney) Ordinance, 2013
- The Seafarer Recruitment and Placement Services (Maritime Labour Convention 2006) (Guernsey and Alderney) Ordinance, 2013
- The Prison (Guernsey) Ordinance, 2013
- The Electronic Census (Guernsey) Ordinance, 2013
- The Companies (Guernsey) Law, 2008 (Amendment) Ordinance, 2013
- The Housing (Control of Occupation) (Extension) Ordinance, 2013
- The Copyright and Performers' Rights (Bailiwick of Guernsey) (Amendment) Ordinance, 2013
- The Health Service (Benefit) (Nurse Prescribers) Ordinance, 2013 The Long-term Care Insurance (Guernsey) (Rates) Ordinance, 2013
- The Health Service (Benefit) (Amendment) Ordinance, 2013
- The Social Insurance (Rates of Contributions and Benefits etc.) Ordinance, 2013
- The Attendance and Invalid Care Allowances Ordinance, 2013
- The Supplementary Benefit (Implementation) (Amendment) Ordinance, 2013
- The Parochial Administration Ordinance, 2013
- The Medicines (Human and Veterinary) (Bailiwick of Guernsey) Law, 2008 (Commencement and Amendment) Ordinance, 2013
- The Health Service (Specialist Medical Benefit) (Amendment) Ordinance, 2013
- The Chief Accountant (Transfer of Functions) (Guernsey) Ordinance, 2013
- The Al-Qaida (Restrictive Measures) (Guernsey) Ordinance, 2013

=== 2014 ===
- Income Tax (Approved International Agreements) (Implementation) (Guernsey) Ordinance, 2013
- The Syria (Restrictive Measures) (Guernsey) (Amendment) Ordinance, 2013
- The North Korea (Restrictive Measures) (Guernsey) (Amendment) (No.2) Ordinance, 2013
- The Competition (Guernsey) (Amendment) Ordinance, 2014
- Income Tax (Guernsey) (Approval of Agreements with Bermuda, Gibraltar, Hungary, Slovakia, Swaziland and Switzerland) Ordinance, 2014
- The Al-Qaida (Restrictive Measures) (Guernsey) (Amendment) Ordinance, 2013
- The European Communities (Implementation of Council Regulation on Nutrition and Health Claims) (Guernsey) Ordinance, 2014
- The European Communities (Implementation of Food Supplements Directive) (Guernsey) Ordinance, 2014
- The Alderney (Application of Legislation) (Food and Drugs) Ordinance, 2014
- The Protection of Investors (Limitation of Liability) (Bailiwick of Guernsey) Ordinance, 2014
- The Aviation Registry (Guernsey) (Amendment) Ordinance, 2014
- The States Trading Companies (Bailiwick of Guernsey) (Amendment) Ordinance, 2014
- The Income Tax (Guernsey) (Amendment) Ordinance, 2014
- The Electronic Transactions (Obligation to Use Electronic Form) (Guernsey) Ordinance, 2014
- The Severe Disability Benefit and Carer's Allowance (Guernsey) Law, 2013 (Commencement) Ordinance, 2014
- The Disclosure (Bailiwick of Guernsey) (Amendment) Ordinance, 2014
- The Criminal Justice (Proceeds of Crime) (Bailiwick of Guernsey) (Amendment) Ordinance, 2014
- The Drug Trafficking (Bailiwick of Guernsey) (Amendment) Ordinance, 2014
- The European Communities (Bailiwick of Guernsey) (Amendment) Ordinance, 2014
- The Income Tax (Tax Relief on Interest Payments) (Guernsey) (Amendment)
- Ordinance, 2014 The Ukraine (Restrictive Measures) (Guernsey) Ordinance, 2014
- The Territorial Integrity etc. of Ukraine (Restrictive Measures) (Guernsey) Ordinance, 2014
- The Central African Republic (Restrictive Measures) (Guernsey) Ordinance, 2014
- The Income Tax (Guernsey) (Approval of Agreements with Costa Rica, Mauritius, the Seychelles, the United States of America and the United Kingdom) Ordinance, 2014
- The Supplementary Benefit (Implementation) (Amendment) Ordinance, 2014
- The Alderney (Application of Legislation) (Supplementary Benefit) (Amendment) Ordinance, 2014
- The Housing (Control of Occupation) (Amendment of Housing Register) Ordinance, 2014
- The Income Tax (Guernsey) (Approval of Agreement with Monaco) Ordinance, 2014
- The Terrorism and Crime (Bailiwick of Guernsey) (Amendment) Ordinance, 2014
- The Banking Deposit Compensation Scheme (Bailiwick of Guernsey) (Amendment) Ordinance, 2014
- The Income Tax (Guernsey) (Approved International Agreements) (Amendment) Ordinance, 2014
- The Alderney eGambling (Operations in Guernsey) (Amendment) Ordinance, 2014
- The Crimea and Sevastopol (Restrictive Measures) (Guernsey) Ordinance, 2014
- The Afghanistan (Restrictive Measures) (Guernsey) (Amendment) Ordinance, 2014
- The Ukraine (Restrictive Measures) (Guernsey) (Amendment) Ordinance, 2014
- The Territorial Integrity etc. of Ukraine (Restrictive Measures) (Guernsey) (Amendment) Ordinance, 2014
- The Central African Republic (Restrictive Measures) (Guernsey) (Amendment) Ordinance, 2014
- The Sudan (Restrictive Measures) (Guernsey) Ordinance, 2014
- The South Sudan (Restrictive Measures) (Guernsey) Ordinance, 2014
- The Excise Duties (Budget) Ordinance, 2014
- The Property Tax (Rates) (Guernsey and Alderney) Ordinance, 2014
- The Public Health (Amendment) Ordinance, 2014
- The Wastewater Charges (Guernsey) Ordinance, 2014
- The Russian Federation (Restrictive Measures) Guernsey Ordinance, 2014
- The Social Insurance (Rates of Contributions and Benefits, etc.) Ordinance, 2014
- The Health Service (Benefit) (Amendment) Ordinance, 2014
- The Long-term Care Insurance (Guernsey) (Rates) Ordinance, 2014
- The Supplementary Benefit (Implementation) (Amendment) (No. 2) Ordinance, 2014
- The Alderney (Application of Legislation) (Supplementary Benefit) (Amendment) (No. 2) Ordinance, 2014
- The Severe Disability Benefit and Carer's Allowance Ordinance, 2014
- The Tobacco Products (Guernsey) Ordinance, 2014
- The Income Tax (Guernsey) (Approval of Agreements with Cyprus, Turks and Caicos and Uruguay) Ordinance, 2014
- The Disclosure (Bailiwick of Guernsey) (Amendment) (No. 2) Ordinance, 2014
- The Terrorism and Crime (Bailiwick of Guernsey) (Amendment) (No. 2) Ordinance, 2014
- Insurance Business (Bailiwick of Guernsey) (Amendment) Ordinance, 2014
- Housing (Control of Occupation) (Amendment of Housing Register) (No.2) Ordinance, 2014
- Health Service (Specialist Medical Benefit) (Amendment) Ordinance, 2014

=== 2015 ===
- The Income Tax (Guernsey) (Approval of Agreement with Macao) Ordinance, 2005
- The Air Navigation (Bailiwick of Guernsey) (Environment Standards) Ordinance, 2015
- The Income Tax (Guernsey) (Miscellaneous Amendment) Ordinance, 2014
- The Companies (Guernsey) Law, 2008 (Amendment) Ordinance, 2014
- The Driving Licences (Guernsey) (Amendment) Ordinance, 2015
- The Charities and Non Profit Organisations (Registration) (Guernsey) Law, 2008 (Amendment) Ordinance, 2014
- The Income Tax (Guernsey) (Amendment) (No.2) Ordinance, 2014
- The Income Tax (Guernsey) (Amendment) (No.3) Ordinance, 2014
- The Pilotage (Amendment) Ordinance, 2015
- The Machinery of Government (Transfer of Functions) (Guernsey) (Amendment) Ordinance, 2015
- The Criminal Justice (Sex Offenders and Miscellaneous Provisions) (Bailiwick of Guernsey) Law, 2013 (Commencement) Ordinance, 2015
- The Guernsey Financial Services Commission (Transfer of Functions) (Fees) (Bailiwick of Guernsey) Ordinance, 2015
- The Income Tax (Guernsey) (Approval of Agreement with the British Virgin Islands) Ordinance, 2015
- The Yemen (Restrictive Measures) (Guernsey) Ordinance, 2014
- The Crimea and Sevastopol (Restrictive Measures) (Guernsey) (Amendment) Ordinance, 2014
- The Cremation (Longue Hougue Facility) Ordinance, 2014
- The Financial Services Ombudsman (Bailiwick of Guernsey) (Commencement and Amendment) Ordinance, 2015
- The Aviation Registry (Guernsey) (Interests in Aircraft) Ordinance, 2015
- The Côte d'Ivoire (Restrictive Measure) (Guernsey) Ordinance, 2015
- The Sark General Purposes and Advisory and Finance and Commerce Committees (Transfer of Functions) (Guernsey) Ordinance, 2015
- The Social Security (Reciprocal Agreement with the Republic of Chile) Ordinance, 2015
- The Regulation of Health and Professions (Medical Practitioners) (Guernsey and Alderney) Ordinance, 2015
- The Electricity (Guernsey) Law, 2001 (Amendment) Ordinance, 2015
- The Criminal Justice (Sex Offenders and Miscellaneous Provisions) (Bailiwick of Guernsey) Law, 2013 (Commencement) (No.2) Ordinance, 2015
- The Income Tax (Zero 10) (Company Intermediate Rate) (Amendment) (Guernsey) Ordinance, 2015
- The Companies (Guernsey) Law, 2008 (Amendment) Ordinance, 2015
- The Prison (Guernsey) Law, 2008 (Amendment) Ordinance, 2015
- The Parochial Administration (Miscellaneous Amendments) Law, 2014 (Commencement) Ordinance, 2015
- Loi relative aux Douits (Amendment) Law, 2013 (Commencement) Ordinance, 2015
- The South Sudan (Restrictive Measure) (Guernsey) Ordinance, 2015

== See also ==
- Law of Guernsey
