= Courts of Guernsey =

Court system of Guernsey

The Courts of Guernsey are responsible for the administration of justice in the Bailiwick of Guernsey, one of the Channel Islands. They apply the law of the Island, which is a mixture of customary law dating back as far as the 10th century and legislation passed by the legislature, the States of Deliberation.

The principal court is the Royal Court and exercises both civil and criminal jurisdiction.

Additional courts, such as the Magistrate's Court, which deals with minor criminal matters, and the Court of Appeal, which hears appeals from the Royal Court, have been added to the Island's legal system over the years.

It is likely that the oldest law that the Royal Court is called upon to provide judgement over is the Clameur de haro, a Norman form of injunction whereby the aggrieved party makes a plea for justice to Rollo, the 10th century founder of the Duchy of Normandy.

== Lower courts ==
=== Magistrate's Court ===
- Criminal Jurisdiction of the Magistrate's Court: dealing with criminal law cases which are liable to attract a sentence of a maximum of two years and/or a fine of £20,000.
- Civil Jurisdiction of the Magistrate's Court: dealing with civil matters where the sum in dispute does not exceed £10,000. Commonly known as “petty debt” cases.
- Family Law Matters: covering child maintenance payments, child contact and other issues which arise from time to time when a relationship breaks down.
- Inquests: held at the magistrates court and are normally held at the request of the Law Officers of the Crown.
- Juvenile Court: part of the Magistrate's Court and, if considered appropriate by His Majesty's Procureur, will sit to consider some cases involving juveniles (under the age of 18) who are charged with criminal offences. His Majesty's Procureur may also refer the case to the Child Youth and Community Tribunal. This court is not open to the public.

=== Contracts Court ===
This court, convened with a Jurat Lieutenant Bailiff and four other Jurats, witnesses conveyances of real property, real property agreements, legal charges on property (bonds), marriage contracts and deed polls prior to their registration on the public records, as well as liquor licence applications.

== Royal Court ==
The Royal Court is the primary court of record. It can sit in a number of configurations, depending on the type of case and the powers to be exercised.

=== The Full Court ===
Historically known as the Cour en Corps comprising:

- a single Judge of law, this being either the Bailiff, the Deputy Bailiff, a Judge of the Royal Court or a Lieutenant Bailiff qualified in law; and,
- not less than seven, but no more than twelve, Jurats acting as Judges of fact.

The Full Court has original criminal jurisdiction in respect of indictable offences committed anywhere in the Bailiwick of Guernsey with a few exceptions and normally deals with serious criminal offences.

The Royal Court is also an appeal court for lower courts.

Dealing with civil jurisdiction cases that are beyond the scope of the Magistrates Court and certain other routine civil matters such as registering new legislation as well as some administrative appeals.

=== The Ordinary Court ===
The Ordinary Court is overseen by a single judge to make findings of law and two to three jurats to make findings of fact. The judge may be a number of individuals: the Bailiff, the Deputy Bailiff, a Judge of the Royal Court or a Lieutenant Bailiff qualified in law. In certain circumstances, a judge may sit alone. The Ordinary Court deals with all original civil business beyond the competence of the Magistrate's Court such as property disputes, company liquidations, guardianships, evictions, terre mises a l'amende applications and the swearing-in of Parish Officials and Police Officers. The Ordinary Court will also deal with criminal matters originating in Alderney or Sark, and acts as a court of appeal for the courts in those jurisdictions.

=== The Matrimonial Causes Division ===
Established under the Matrimonial Causes Law (Guernsey), 1939, constituted by a single Judge of Law, this being either the Bailiff, the Deputy Bailiff, a Judge of the Royal Court or a Lieutenant Bailiff qualified in law, sitting alone; or a single Judge of Law sitting with four Jurats.

Dealing with matters of divorce, judicial separation, annulments and dissolutions of marriages, and contentious judicial separations.

== Appeals courts ==
=== Guernsey Court of Appeal ===
Constituted under the Court of Appeal (Guernsey) Law 1961, it comprises the Bailiff of Guernsey and other judges appointed by warrant of the Sovereign.

Guernsey and Jersey work closely together with the bailiff of each appointed to the opposite island’s Court of Appeal so that cases that may have a conflict of interest can be heard.

A higher appeal lies from the Guernsey Court of Appeal to the Judicial Committee of the Privy Council.

=== Judicial Committee of the Privy Council ===
The Judicial Committee of the Privy Council is the final court of appeal for both civil and criminal matters where the first hearing took place in the Magistrate's Court, the Royal Court, the Court of Alderney or the Court of the Seneschal.

The Judicial Committee usually sits in the Middlesex Guildhall building in London. Its members are derived from those of the Supreme Court of the United Kingdom.

== Other courts ==
=== Court of Chief Pleas ===
An ancient Court, constituted in the same way as a Full Court. It is attended by the Full Court, the Law Officers of the Crown, Advocates and the Seigneurs and Bordiers owing suit to the Court.

Normally held just once a year at the start of the legal year when oaths are taken from HM Procureur, HM Receiver General and HM Comptroller. It is followed by a service at the Town Church then a traditional dinner.

Dealing with a mixture of issues, such as explosives licenses, water courses, charitable funds, “Salle Publique Licences” and is an opportunity to admit to the Guernsey Bar, qualified students.

=== European Court of Human Rights ===
Effective from 2006, the Human Rights (Bailiwick of Guernsey) Law, 2000 incorporates into Bailiwick legislation the European Convention for the Protection of Human Rights and Fundamental Freedoms.

People are able to pursue their rights under the European Convention on Human Rights in the Bailiwick's courts and tribunals, instead of having to go to the European Court in Strasbourg although that is still the final appeal route.

=== Ecclesiastical Court ===
The Ecclesiastical Court's origins probably go back beyond surviving written records, existing in the 13th century, and almost certainly for centuries before that.

Many of the old jurisdiction functions have fallen by the way, such as dealing with acts of heresy and idolatry. Today the court deals with just three matters:

- The proving of wills and the issuing of letters of administration in deceased estates;
- The granting of marriage licences
- The issuing of faculties

In this respect the Ecclesiastical Court is unique in the world.

Normally held each Friday and presided over by the Dean of Guernsey acting under a commission from the Bishop of Winchester (prior to the time of Queen Elizabeth I, the Bishop of Coutances).

The court used to be held in an upper room in the Town Church where its most notorious decision was the sentencing in 1556 of the Guernsey Martyrs for heresy. The court relocated in 1822. It is currently held in its own offices within the Saint Peter Port Constables office building.

== Additional jurisdictions ==
=== Sark ===
Chief Pleas (French: Chefs Plaids; Sercquiais: Cheurs Pliaids) is the parliament of Sark. Despite having its own legislative assembly, Sark voluntarily submits to Guernsey in matters of criminal law.

=== Alderney ===
The Court of Alderney exercises unlimited original jurisdiction in civil matters and limited jurisdiction in criminal matters. The Court sits with a Chairman (the Judge of Alderney) and at least three of the six Jurats. Appeals are made to the Royal Court of Guernsey, which also exercises some original jurisdiction in criminal matters in Alderney, and thence to the Judicial Committee of the Privy Council.

== Alternatives to Court ==
=== Tribunals ===
The use of tribunals has increased over the years, with tribunals normally created by statute and is a less formal and potentially faster source of justice. These include:

- Chambre de Discipline. Under the Guernsey Bar (Bailiwick of Guernsey) Law, 2007 (as amended). For complaints made against Advocates.
- Child Youth and Community Tribunal (CYCT). Created under the Children (Guernsey and Alderney) Law 2008.
- Clergy Discipline Measure. A Church of England disciplinary tribunal established in Guernsey when necessary under the Clergy Discipline (Bailiwick Of Guernsey) Order, 2006
- Employment & Discrimination Tribunal. The Tribunal deals with employment and sex discrimination related matters.
- Mental Health Review Tribunals. The Tribunal provides a way for patients to appeal against detention or a Community Treatment Order.
- Planning Tribunal. Deals with appeals against the Environment Department planning decisions
- Parochial Appeals Tribunals Loi relative aux Douits (Amendment) Law, 2013 and the Parochial Administration Ordinance, 2013
- Police Complaints Commission, a Tribunal
- Supplementary Benefit Tribunal. For aggrieved benefit recipients to have their appeal heard by an independent tribunal.
- Tax Tribunal. An independent appeal body set up to hear income tax appeals which cannot otherwise be resolved.
- Utilities Appeals Tribunal. Deals with complaints made against the Office of Utility Regulation.

=== Arbitration ===
Arbitration in civil matters is recommended in Guernsey using the Arbitration (Guernsey) Law, 1982. There are no legal impediments to arbitrating any type of dispute, except where the relief sought by the claimant is only available from specific bodies or institutions, such as the Royal Court. There is a Channel Islands branch of the Chartered Institute of Arbitrators.

== Ancillary Notes ==
=== Language ===
After the Norman conquest of England in 1066, Norman French became the official language used at court and by the nobles. Guernsey's Royal Court and officials employed standard French from the Medieval period to the mid 20th century.

In 1926 English was made an official language of the States of Guernsey although it took more time for the Courts to change. Until 1948, French was the official language of Guernsey.

=== Court Building ===
The earliest reference to a court building dates from the 12th century, when reference is made to a building in St Peter Port in a district known as La Plaiderie (literally translated as the place of pleading) where courts were held in the King's barn, although it had to be vacated at lunch time so a corn market could take place in the afternoons. During the English Civil War it was relocated temporarily to Elizabeth College to put it out of range of the Royalist cannon on Castle Cornet.

It was 1799 before the current court buildings were built, with the first sitting in 1803. Expanded repeatedly over the years, with the latest addition completed in 2006.

=== Advocates ===
Only Advocates of the Royal Court may have rights of audience to the Royal Court and the Guernsey Court of Appeal. The Advocate is an officer of the Royal Court whose primary duty is to the Court and not to the client.

The qualification route is normally through obtaining a Bachelor of Laws degree in England, then a qualification as a solicitor or barrister in England and Wales, followed by vocational training, passing Guernsey Bar exams and then obtaining a Certificat d’Etudes Juridiques Françaises et Normandes from Caen University

=== Law Officers ===
Appointed by the Crown.

- H.M. Procureur (Attorney General) & H.M. Receiver General
- H.M. Comptroller (Solicitor General) & H.M. Deputy Receiver General

=== Registry ===
His Majesty's Greffier is Clerk of the Royal Court and is responsible for maintaining records of all Court proceedings.

The court building holds many historic documentary records as well as maintaining Island records, such as births, marriages, deaths and property ownership.

=== Jurat ===
A maximum of 16 Jurats, each Jurat is elected by secret ballot at the States of Election and once elected, holds office until 70 which may be extended to a maximum age of 72.

The post of Juré-Justicier Suppléant was created in 2008 for an experienced Jurat and has a retirement age of 75.

=== Earliest Courts ===
Rollo, on being given his lands by Charles the Simple in 911AD, established a superior court in Rouen, which had the name of Eschequier or Exchequer, to which appeals could be made. Each Fief, or manorial land area had a court composed of principal tenants. In Guernsey before 1066, a superior court was introduced above the Fiefs and below the Eschequier Court in Rouen and comprised the Bailiff and four Knights to hear appeals and to try criminals.

It was in the reign of King John the lands in France were lost and as the Island had shown their loyalty to the Duke of Normandy (the King of England, King John), the appeal system moved to England and the Royal Court was established.

In 1642 during the English Civil War the Royal Court was dissolved by Parliament, although courts continued, being relocated temporarily to Elizabeth College to put it out of range of the Royalist cannon on Castle Cornet.

=== Courts no longer in use ===
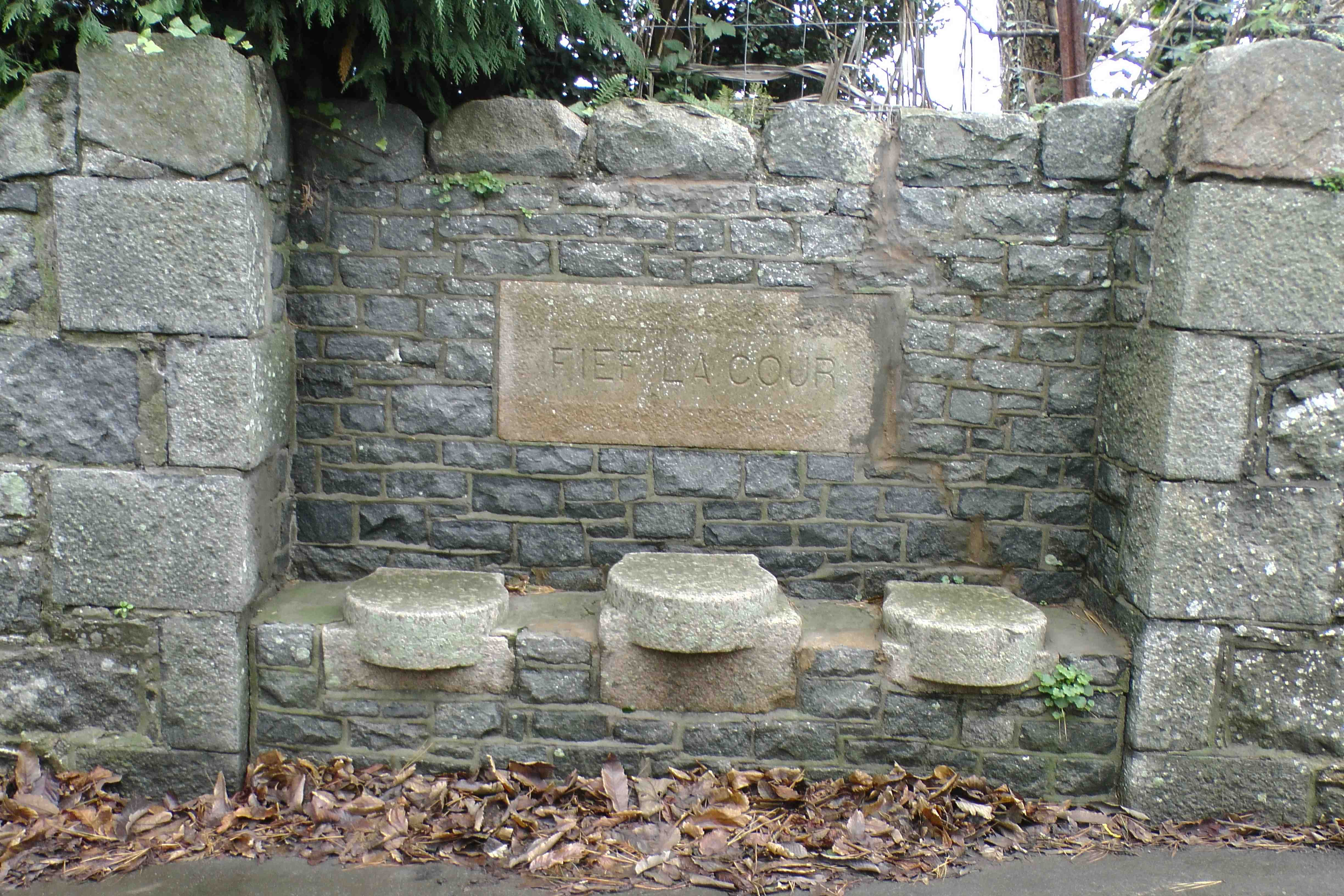
Fief la Cour, Rue Des Vallees

- Cour d'Appeaux was a court of appeal from the Cour Ordinaire or Ordinary Court, comprising more Jurats than in the Ordinary Court.
- Court of Judgements was a court of appeal above the Cour d'Appeaux comprising at least seven Jurats. There could even be less Jurats at this court than at the Cour d'Appeaux.
- Mobilaire Courts for matters relating to moveables and chattels. On one Monday the cases heard would be from the Low Parishes (St Sampson, St Peter Port and the Vale) and on the next Monday, cases from the High Parishes (all other Parishes).
- Plaids d'Heritage for determining all suits relative to inheritance.
- Des Namps or Tuesday Courts dealing with seizures and distress.
- Saturday Courts for passing contracts, admiralty causes and criminal informations.
- Criminal Court of Correctional Police. The Bailiff and two Jurats with a limit on the sentence.
- Superior Criminal Court. The Bailiff and at least seven Jurats for more serious criminal cases.
- Fief la Cour. Open air courts for issues that were not deemed major enough to trouble the Royal Court.
- German Military Courts. During the 1940-5 occupation of the Channel Islands, the Wehrmacht, Kriegsmarine and Luftwaffe each operated Military Courts.

== See also ==
- Law of Guernsey
- List of laws of Guernsey
- Politics of Guernsey
- Courts of Jersey
- Judiciary of the Isle of Man

== External ==
- The Guernsey Royal Court
- Alderney Court Office
- Royal Court Calendar 2016
- Clameur de Haro
