= Bailiff of Guernsey =

Head of the government of Guernsey

- Flag of Guernsey
- Incumbent; Jessica Roland since 1 September 2026
- Style: His/Her Excellency
- Member of: Royal Court; Court of Appeal; States of Guernsey
- Appointer: Monarch of the United Kingdom; on the advice of the Lieutenant Governor and Lord Chancellor
- Term length: At His Majesty's Pleasure; until retirement age of 65
- Formation: 1270
- First holder: Hugh de Trubleville
- Deputy: Deputy Bailiff of Guernsey

The title Bailiff of Guernsey has been used since at least the 13th century and indicated the leading citizen of Guernsey.

The 91st and current bailiff is Jessica Roland, the first female.

== History ==
A Bailli, the early Norman name for Bailiff was the person who held and preserved the territory for the Duke of Normandy via the Sénéchale de Normandie and their Vicomté des Îles, upholding the laws of Normandy.

Significant change took place following the loss of Normandy in 1204 with King John appointing resident Wardens to defend the islands. John, as Count of Mortain, having himself been made a Warden of the Isles in 1198.

We find that during the 13th century the term Bailli had different meanings however by the 14th century the rights and duties had solidified and become a distinct office from the sub-warden, who became the military commander on the island. The first Bailiff of Guernsey was Hugh de Trubleville who served from 1270 to 1277.

The duty of the Bailiff was to preside over the Royal Court and direct the twelve Jurats who had the power to render judgement.

In 1617 a Privy Council decision clarified the division of civil and military responsibilities between the Bailiffs and the Lieutenant Governors in Guernsey and Jersey. For the first time the Crown laid down the Bailiff's precedence over the Governor in judicial affairs and in the States chamber.

Until 1813 the position of Bailiff was virtually unpaid, changing when a petition by the then Bailiff, Peter de Havilland was accepted by the Prince Regent.

The Bailiff was required to reside in Guernsey and was appointed by either the King or the Warden of the Channel Islands or Guernsey although it was later normal for the Jurats to elect a Bailiff. The appointment is now made by the Sovereign by letters patent under the Great Seal, following recommendations.

The duties of the Bailiff were reduced in 2004 to avoid perceived conflicts of interest when acting in a political sense as head of the States of Deliberation with a casting vote in passing laws, followed by sitting in court and ruling on these same laws in a litigation or criminal case. The political duties have now been reduced. This has led to the island having two main citizens, the President of the Policy and Resources Committee of Guernsey, also known as the "Chief Minister" being the figurehead of the States of Guernsey, the Bailiff remaining head of the Island as regards the law and civic matters.

== Qualifications, appointment and term of office ==
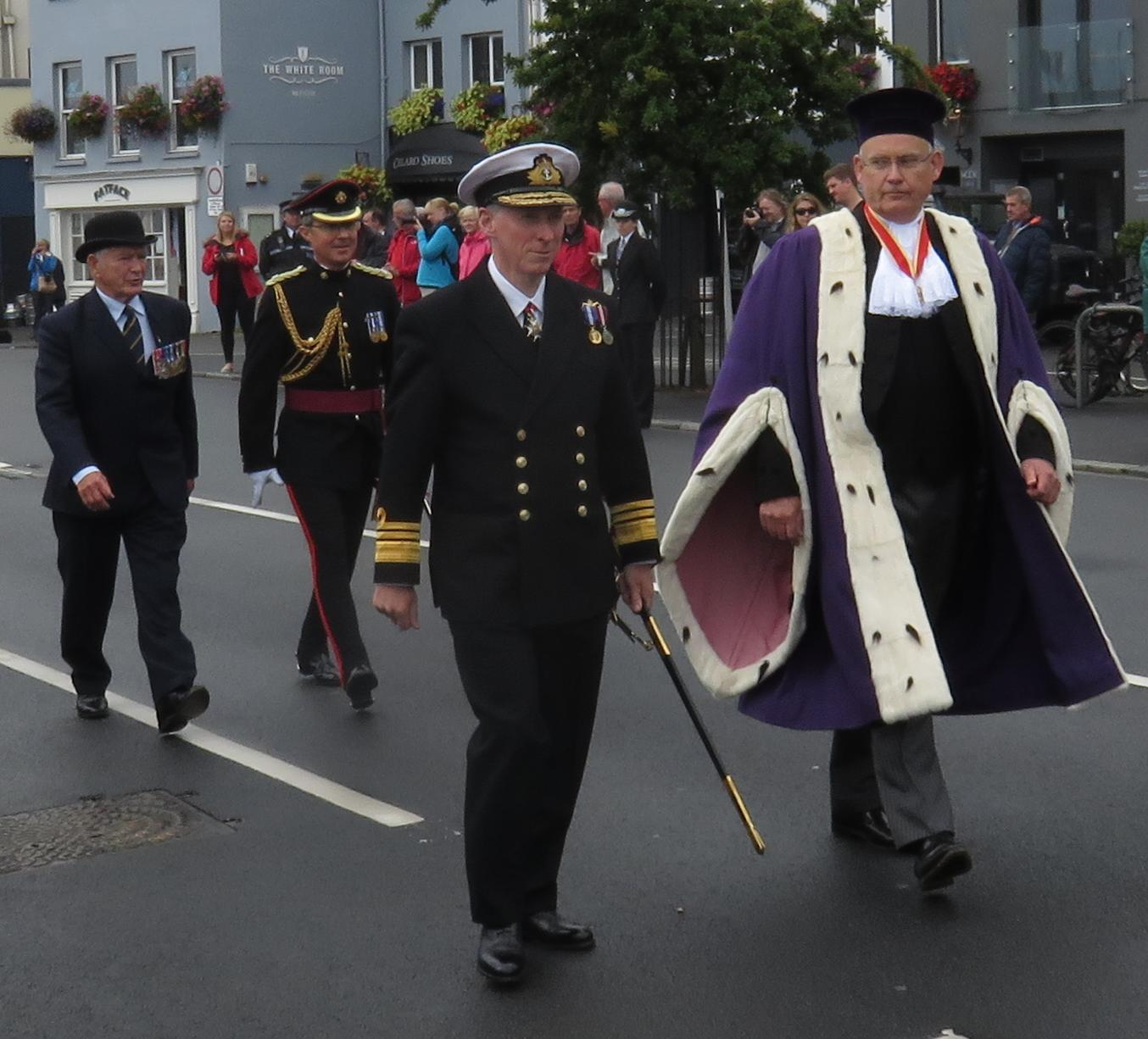
(former Bailiff) Richard Collas (right) attending the Queen's birthday parade 2016 in St. Peter Port, Guernsey in his formal robes

From the start of the 19th century a Bailiff has always been a Guernsey qualified lawyer, which means qualifying in both English law and then obtaining a Certificat d’Etudes Juridiques Françaises et Normandes from Caen University before being invited to the Bar in Guernsey. More recently the proposed Bailiff now normally serves as H.M. Procureur and/or as Deputy Bailiff before assuming the duty of Bailiff.

The new Bailiff is robed and sworn into the office in front of the Jurats, the Members of the States of Guernsey and Advocates of the Royal Court. The oath is given in French with the oath giver undertaking to fulfil the office by maintaining the laws, liberties and customs of the island, advancing the Glory of God and honouring the Sovereign, as a true and loyal subject.

Since 1853 the Bailiffs' dress is a silk lined robe of purple, trimmed with ermine. A velvet bonnet of traditional French design is the approved headgear.

The retirement age is set out in the letter of patent, normally the age of 65.

== Duties ==
Current duties include:

- Legal
  - Since 1950 the Bailiff is confirmed as the sole judge of law in the Royal Court, only having a vote in a case of indecision by the Jurats.
  - On cases where fact is not an issue the Bailiff, or Deputy Bailiff may sit in sole judgement.
  - Ex officio President and a Judge of the Guernsey Court of Appeal.
- Political
  - Presiding officer of the States of Deliberation, acting as moderator of debate.
- Communications link
  - The Bailiff's Chamber is the formal link between Guernsey and Governments of other countries, including formal and informal correspondence with the British Government.
- Civic Head
  - The Bailiff is the civic head of the community and represents Guernsey on occasions of a non-political nature including representing the people on Royal visits.
- Deputy Lieutenant Governor
  - Sworn in as the Deputy Lieutenant Governor of Guernsey, the Bailiff fulfils the function of Lieutenant Governor of Guernsey during absences.
- Patron of local charities
- May be appointed as a member of the Court of Appeal of Jersey

In the absence of the Bailiff, the Deputy Bailiff will normally fulfil most duties. The office of Deputy Bailiff was created in 1969.

A Judge of the Royal Court may preside over the Royal Court.

A senior Jurat may be appointed a Lieutenant Bailiff to preside over lesser Courts, such as the Contract Court and Liquor Licensing Extension Court. A professional lawyer may also be appointed as a Lieutenant Bailiff. A Lieutenant Bailiff may fulfil additional court duties in an emergency situation.

== Deputy Bailiff of Guernsey ==
The office of Deputy Bailiff of Guernsey assists the Bailiff in judicial, parliamentary, and civic duties and stands in for the Bailiff when they are unavailable. They also continue the court's judicial work and may preside over the States of Deliberation in the absence of the Bailiff. This role was created in 1969, and the Deputy Bailiff is appointed by the Sovereign based on recommendations. Jessica Roland became the first female Deputy Bailiff in May 2020.

=== List of Deputy Bailiff's of Guernsey ===
- Sir John Loveridge (1969–1973)
- Sir Charles Frossard (1973–1982)
- Sir Graham Dorey (1982–1992)
- Sir de Vic Carey (1992–1999)
- Sir Richard Collas (2005–2012)
- Sir Richard McMahon (2012–2020)
- Jessica Roland (2020–2026)
- TBA (2026–onwards)

== See also ==
- Courts of Guernsey
- List of bailiffs of Guernsey
- Bailiff (Channel Islands)
