= John Elkington =

John Elkington may refer to:

- John Elkington (business author) (born 1949), English businessman and author
- John Elkington (British Army officer) (1830–1889), Lieutenant Governor of Guernsey
- John Ford Elkington (1866–1944), son of the above and also a British Army officer
- John Elkington (pilot) (1920–2019), British fighter pilot
- John Simeon Colebrook Elkington (1871–1955), Australian public health advocate
- John A. Elkington, American real estate developer
