= General Foley =

General Foley may refer to:

- John Foley (British Army officer) (born 1939), British Army lieutenant general
- Robert F. Foley (born 1941), U.S. Army lieutenant general
- St George Gerald Foley (1814–1897), British Army general

== See also ==
- Attorney General Foley (disambiguation)
