= John Ford Elkington =

British Army officer (1866–1944)

John Ford Elkington DSO
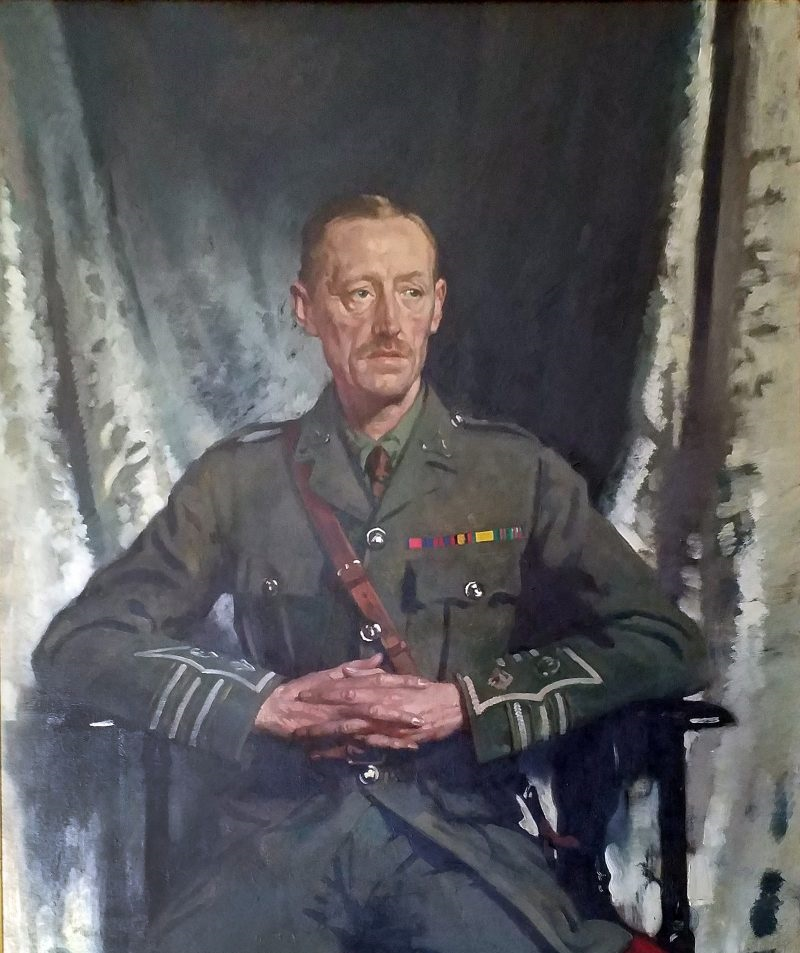
- John Elkington, painted by William Orpen in 1916
- Born: 3 February 1866
- Died: 27 June 1944 (aged 78)
- Military career
- Branch: British Army (1886–1914, 1916–1918); French Army (1914–1916)
- Rank: Lieutenant colonel (British Army); Corporal (French Army)
- Unit: Royal Warwickshire Regiment
- Commands: 1st battalion, 1914
- Conflicts: Second Boer War (1900–1902); First World War (1914–1918)
- Awards: Distinguished Service Order

Lieutenant Colonel John Ford Elkington DSO (3 February 1866 – 27 June 1944) was a British Army officer. Elkington attended Elizabeth College in Guernsey and the Royal Military College, Sandhurst. He was commissioned into the Royal Warwickshire Regiment in 1886. Elkington served with the West African Frontier Force, with British forces in the Second Boer War and in India. In 1914 he was promoted to lieutenant colonel and given command of his regiment's 1st battalion. Elkington deployed to France at the start of the First World War with his unit and saw action at the 26 August Battle of Le Cateau during the Great Retreat from Mons. That afternoon the battalion retreated to Saint-Quentin, Aisne where it became mixed with the 2nd battalion of the Royal Dublin Fusiliers. The men were exhausted and hungry and Elkington was disappointed at finding no onward transport in the town. The Dublins' commander, Lieutenant Colonel Mainwaring, entered into a written agreement with the town's mayor to surrender rather than fight in the streets, though Elkington stated he did not see the agreement. The following day a cavalry major arrived in the town and by threats and encouragement succeeded in marching the men and other stragglers out of the town and away from advancing German forces.

Two weeks after the incident Elkington was charged with cowardice at a court-martial. Though cleared of the main charge he was convicted of conduct unbecoming an officer and a gentleman and, with Mainwaring, was cashiered. Elkington applied to rejoin the army as a private but was refused and instead travelled to Paris to join the French Foreign Legion. In late Spring 1915 he fought at the Second Battle of Artois and received the Croix de Guerre for bravery in rescuing a detachment of his unit. Elkington was wounded in the leg by machine-gun fire while leading an assault in the Second Battle of Champagne on 28 September 1915. He spent the next 10 months in hospital but received a palm to his Croix de Guerre and was awarded the Médaille Militaire on the orders of General Joseph Joffre. News of the awards reached the British press and in September 1916 he returned to a hero's welcome. Elkington was reinstated to his previous rank in the army and appointed to the Distinguished Service Order by George V.

Elkington's wound left him with difficulties walking and he retired from the army in 1918. In retirement he lived in Burghclere, Hampshire. After his son was killed in the Second World War Elkington commissioned a stained glass window in the local church. He died before it was completed and it was unveiled, with a plaque in Elkington's honour, by Field Marshal Bernard Montgomery in 1946.

== Early career ==
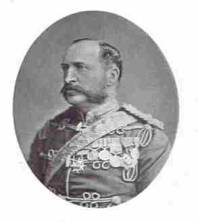
Elkington's father, John Henry Ford Elkington

John Ford Elkington was born on 3 February 1866 in Newcastle, Jamaica, which was then a British Army camp. He was the son of Irish-born British Army officer John Henry Ford Elkington (1830–1889), who rose to the rank of lieutenant-general and was later Lieutenant Governor of Guernsey. His mother was Scottish-born Margaret Elkington née Jamieson (1847–1935). Elkington had four brothers, who all served in the army, and one sister.

Elkington was educated at Elizabeth College in Guernsey before attending the Royal Military College, Sandhurst on a Queen's Cadet scholarship. He was appointed a lieutenant in the Royal Warwickshire Regiment, in which his father had also served, on 30 January 1886. He served in the regiment's 1st battalion, alongside another former Elizabeth College student, the future air commodore Henry Le Marchant Brock.

Elkington was promoted to the supernumerary rank of captain on 25 January 1893. He volunteered to serve in the West African Frontier Force and was deployed to Nigeria between 11 March 1899 and 23 May 1900 when he was invalided home with malaria. On 24 May 1900 Elkington was appointed to a captaincy within his regiment, in lieu of his supernumerary appointment.

Elkington afterwards served in the Second Boer War (1900–1902). For his service he received the Queen's South Africa Medal with clasps for the Cape Colony, Orange Free State, Belfast and South Africa. Elkington was promoted to major on 10 April 1901. He returned to South Africa in 1907, being seconded to his regiment's 3rd battalion.

Elkington was married to Mary Rew on 9 July 1908. The couple had three children John David Rew Elkington born 1909, Jean Margaret Rew Elkington, born 1914 and Richard Ford Rew Elkington, born 1918. They lived in Pangbourne, in a house formerly the residence of Warren Hastings. Elkington was posted to British India in the early 1910s, returning to the United Kingdom in January 1913. During this service he was awarded the George V Delhi Durbar Medal. He was promoted to lieutenant colonel on 24 February 1914, receiving seniority backdated to 6 April 1910. For part of early 1914 he commanded Shorncliffe Army Camp in Kent.

== August 1914 ==
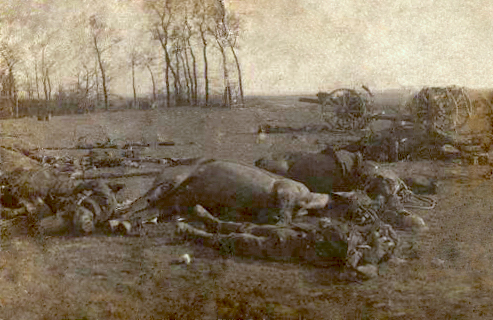
British dead at Le Cateau

Elkington deployed with the 1st battalion of his regiment to the Western Front of the First World War. They fought at the 26 August 1914 Battle of Le Cateau, a delaying action during the Great Retreat from Mons and afterwards retreated towards the Marne. The battalion arrived at Saint-Quentin, Aisne at mid-afternoon on 26 August, in company with the 2nd battalion of the Royal Dublin Fusiliers (the battalions were both part of the 10th Infantry Brigade of the 4th Infantry Division). Elkington and the Dublins' commander Lieutenant Colonel Arthur Mainwaring, found the Grand Place of the town filled with British stragglers, separated from their units and with very few officers. They found these troops had little motivation and were doing little more than awaiting capture by the advancing Germans.

The men of the Warwicks and Dublins were exhausted and hungry. They had expected to find trains in the town to carry them onwards but these were not present; the men believed they were surrounded by the advancing German forces. Elkington, who was the senior officer, and Mainwaring were contacted by local politicians urging them to avoid a battle in the town. Elkington later claimed that Mainwaring met with the mayor on 27 August and signed a paper agreeing to surrender to the Germans. Mainwaring stated that he was hoping to avoid any shelling of the town. Elkington claimed to have no knowledge of the content of the agreement until he was shown it at his court martial. Elkington and Mainwaring kept their men in sheds at the railway station, to the west of the town, and disarmed them.

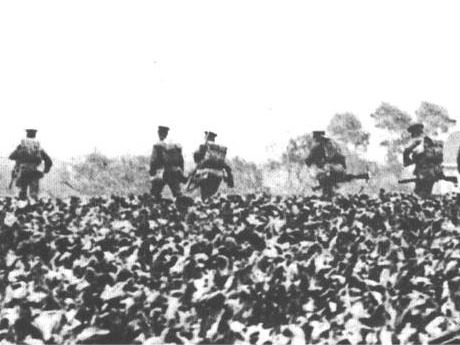
Retreating British troops near Saint-Quentin

Late on the night of 27 August Major Tom Bridges of the 4th (Royal Irish) Dragoon Guards arrived in the town. Bridges' C Squadron had been the first British unit to open fire on the Western Front on 22 August. Bridges was appalled at the prospect of a mass surrender to German forces and retrieved the agreement from the French mayor. Despite being outranked he told Elkington and Mainwaring to assemble their men and continue the retreat, offering to cover them with his cavalry squadron. The men were reluctant to do so until Bridges stated that unless they marched within 30 minutes he would leave no British soldier alive in the town. This had the desired effect and the two battalions continued their march.

Bridges afterwards rallied the 200–300 stragglers in the town square. He was unsuccessful in inspiring them until, having looted a toy shop, he paraded round the square with his trumpeter playing The British Grenadiers and It's a Long Way to Tipperary on a drum and tin whistle. Bridges marched them out of the town, accompanied by two men on mouth organs.

One of Elkington's officers was the future field marshal Bernard Montgomery, who recalled the unit marching in the gap between the forward German cavalry screen and their following infantry. In his memoirs Montgomery criticised Elkington's leadership in this period, though he praised his successor Major A. J. Poole. Mainwaring and Elkington's battalions reached the British lines but were understrength; the Warwicks were still missing 291 stragglers on 1 September. The battalions were combined into a composite unit until 6 September when sufficient reinforcements and stragglers were gathered to allow the units to stand alone.

Mainwaring and Elkington were brought before a court-martial, headed by Brigadier-General Aylmer Hunter-Weston, two weeks after the Saint-Quentin incident. The court records were lost but it is known that Elkington was originally charged with cowardice in the face of the enemy, which was punishable by the death penalty. Elkington was convicted of the lesser charge of conduct unbecoming an officer and a gentleman on grounds of a mental breakdown suffered at a time of great stress. Elkington and Mainwaring were sentenced to be cashiered, dismissed with loss of rank and pension, on 14 September 1914. Elkington was the first British officer of the war to be sentenced to cashiering by a court-martial.

== French Foreign Legion ==
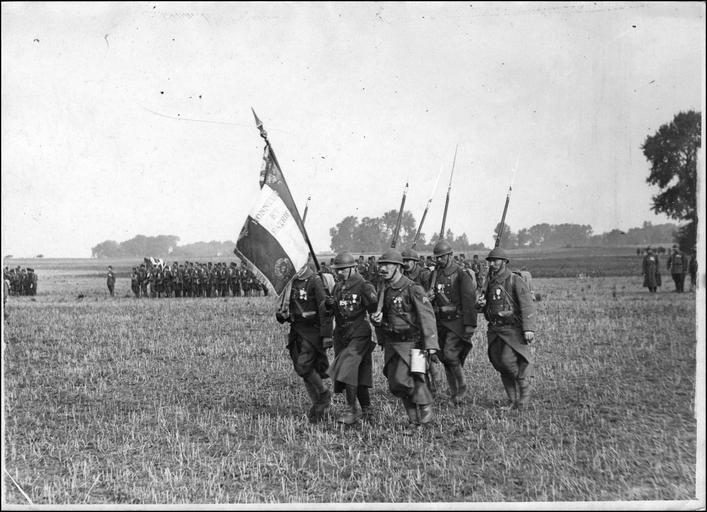
Legionnaires of the Marching Regiment of the Foreign Legion, 1916

Elkington returned home after his dismissal; he offered to rejoin the British Army in the ranks but was refused. He decided instead that he would join the French Foreign Legion and did so by the end of September, enlisting at Paris under his real name. Elkington later recalled that "as I could not serve England I would serve France". Because his enlistment caused him to disappear from British society some of his acquaintances thought that he had committed suicide. Throughout his Foreign Legion service Elkington carried a copy of Rudyard Kipling's poem "If—".

Elkington underwent basic training in the Rhône valley, before marching to the front as a 2nd class legionnaire in the 3rd Marching Regiment of the 1st Foreign Regiment to take part in the Second Battle of Artois. Most of the British members of his unit transferred out at this time to join the British Army, but this option was not open to Elkington. He made a point of avoiding British units in the field, in case he was recognised. This happened on just one occasion when "one day someone shouted my name. I remember I was just about to wash in a stream when a staff motor drove by and an officer waved his hand and called out. But I pretended not to hear and turned away". En route to Artois Elkington, growing tired of his rations, dined at the Grand Hotel in Lyons. There he came across Dr David Wheeler, an American surgeon with the French Red Cross who had also enlisted in the legion, who mistook Elkington for a tramp. The pair afterwards became close friends.

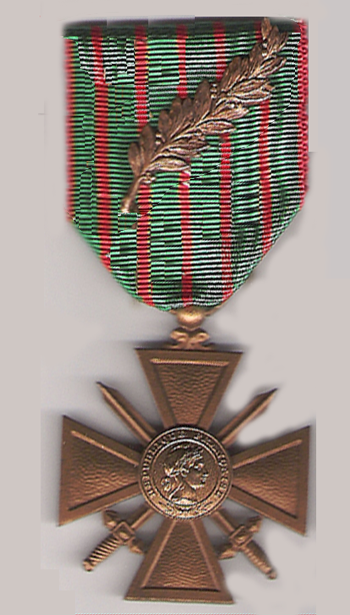
Croix de Guerre with palm

At Artois (also called the Battle of Vimy Ridge) Elkington rallied a section of his unit recovering from a failed attack and led them to rescue a detachment trapped in front of them by French shellfire. For this action he was awarded the Croix de Guerre. A week later, at Souchez, Elkington prevented his platoon from assaulting, as ordered, until he had destroyed a German machine gun position that threatened their attack. On 14 July 1915 Elkington was transferred to the 2nd Marching Regiment of the 1st Foreign Regiment.

Elkington's unit took part in the Second Battle of Champagne with an assault on Navarin Farm near Souain-Perthes-lès-Hurlus on 28 September 1915. Having crossed two lines of wire and empty trenches into Horeshoe Wood Elkington ran ahead of his section in an attack on the last line of trenches before the farm. He routed a detachment of German troops by throwing grenades but was hit by a hidden machine gun, several bullets smashing his right leg. Wheeler was hit in the calf by the same burst of fire but tended to Elkington, bandaging the leg and giving him a shot of morphine. Wheeler thought Elkington would lose the leg. After bandaging his own wound Wheeler fainted on Elkington and the two men lay in a rain-filled trench, some 100 yards (91 m) from the German position, for more than 13 hours until rescued by a passing patrol.

Elkington was taken to a hospital at Grenoble in south-east France; he remained there for ten months and had to spend the first eight months lying flat on his back. The French commander-in-chief, General Joseph Joffre, ordered that Elkington receive the Médaille militaire and be mentioned in orders (receiving palm leaves for his Croix de Guerre). These decorations were presented at the hospital by a general. Elkington was also promoted to the rank of corporal. Wheeler also recovered and remained with the legion until 1917 when he joined the newly arrived American forces; he died four months before the end of the war.

== Later career ==
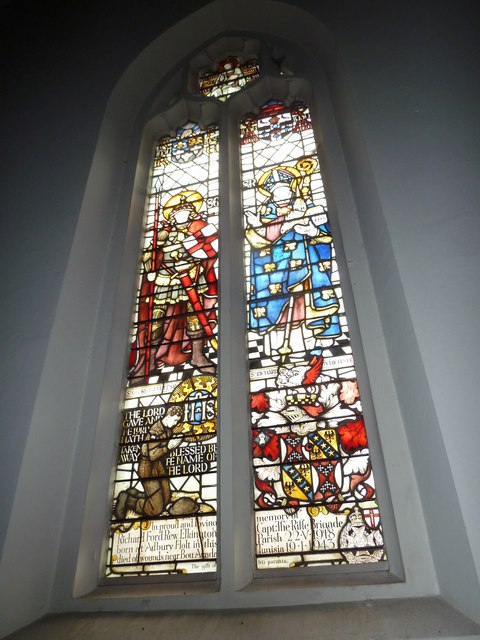
Memorial window to son

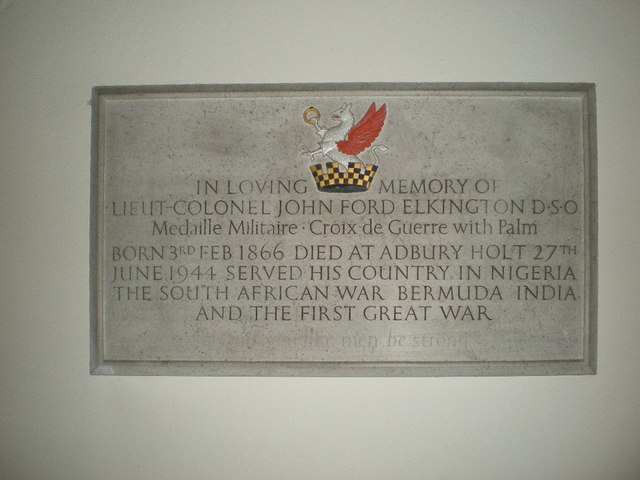
Memorial plaque

Elkington's injury caused him difficulty walking (he had to use two sticks) and he was discharged from the legion in July 1916. His actions in the legion had been covered by the British press and Hunter-Weston, by now a corps commander, instigated the process the re-appoint him to the British Army. Upon returning to Britain in September 1916 Elkington received a hero's welcome and a full pardon from George V. He twice met with the king, the second time to be invested into the Distinguished Service Order, to which he was appointed on 28 October 1916 (by which time he had been confirmed in his former rank). Elkington's wounds precluded any further active service but he was re-instated as a lieutenant colonel in the Warwickshire Regiment. Elkington stated "It is wonderful to feel, that once again I have the confidence of my King and my country. I am afraid my career in the field is ended, but I must not complain". By contrast Mainwaring never recovered his reputation and died, in obscurity, in 1930.

Shortly after returning to Britain in 1916 Elkington was painted by William Orpen. Orpen told Elkington's wife: "I do not think I have ever painted a man I admired so much as the Colonel" and exhibited the work at the Royal Academy in London in 1917. The Evening Despatch of 7 May 1917 noted that Orpen's portrait represented "a soldier to the tips of his fingers, but a soldier who has suffered, mentally and physically, and whose manly features bear the traces of his suffering". Orpen gifted the work to Elkington in February 1918.

Elkington was placed on half-pay on 24 February 1918 and retired on 1 July 1919. In retirement Elkington and his family moved to Burghclere in Hampshire, where he served as a justice of the peace. For his service in the war Elkington was awarded the Mons Star, the British War Medal and the Victory Medal. He chose not to wear the medals, stating that "I did nothing of particular note. I was with the others in the trenches". Elkington remained in the British Army reserves until 3 February 1921, when he reached the age limit.

Elkington's youngest son served with the 10th battalion of the Rifle Brigade during the Second World War and was killed in action near Bou Arada, Tunisia on 19 January 1943. Elkington bestowed a stained glass window in his son's honour at the Church of the Ascension in Burghclere. Elkington died on 27 June 1944, before it could be unveiled. The window, with additional plaques honouring Elkington and his son-in-law Sir Richard de Bacquencourt des Voeux (who was killed while commanding the 156th Parachute Battalion at the Battle of Arnhem on 20 September 1944), was unveiled in May 1946 by Montgomery. Mary Elkington died on 26 May 1956. Elkington's tunic is held in the collection of the Warwickshire Regiment's Museum.
