= John Bell (British Army officer) =

British Army officer

General Sir John Bell GCB
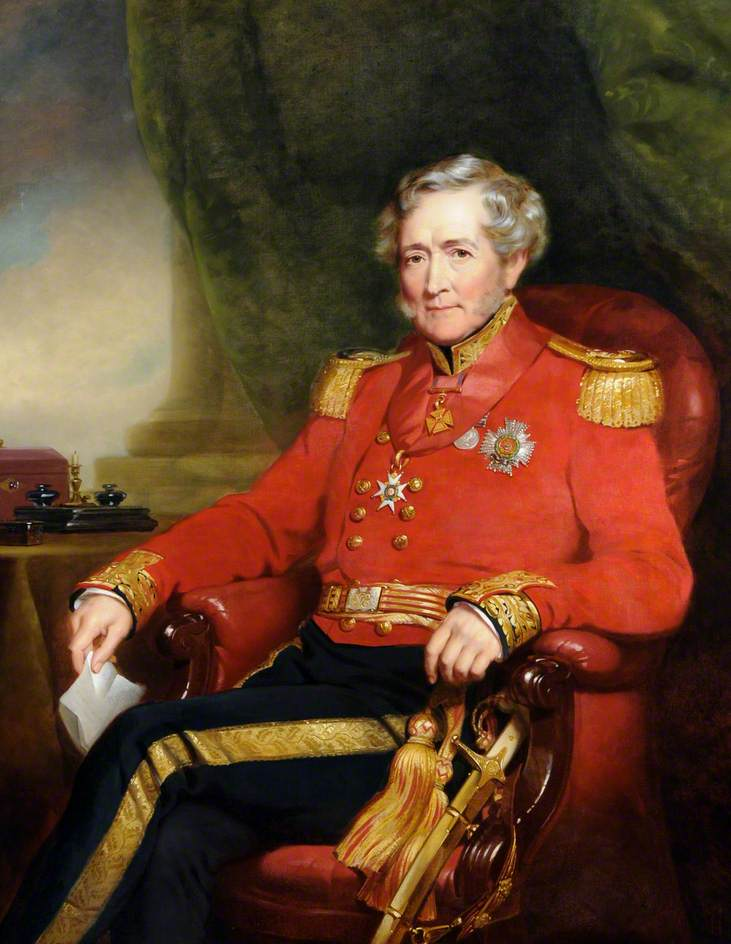
- Portrait of Bell by John Lucas
- Born: 1 January 1782; St Andrews, Fife
- Died: 20 November 1876 (aged 94); Belgravia, London
- Military career
- Allegiance: United Kingdom
- Branch: British Army
- Rank: General
- Conflicts: Peninsular War; War of 1812
- Awards: Knight Grand Cross of the Order of the Bath

General Sir John Bell, GCB (1 January 1782 – 20 November 1876) was a British Army officer.

== Background ==
Born at Bonytoun in the county of Fife, he was the son of David Bell and Janet Duncan. After attending Dundee Academy, he worked first as a merchant and in 1805 entered the British Army as an ensign of the 52nd (Oxfordshire) Regiment of Foot. Bell was known as a witty raconteur, and gifted artist and draughtsman.

== Career ==
He went to Sicily a year later and subsequently took part in the Peninsular War until 1814. During this time, he was decorated with the Army Silver Medal with six clasps and received the Army Gold Cross. Bell was wounded in the Battle of Vimeiro in 1808 and was in the war's last years assistant quartermaster-general. In December 1814, he was transferred with his regiment to the United States and was involved in the Anglo-American War until the beginning of the following year. After his return to England, he was awarded a Companion of the Order of the Bath.

Bell was sent to the Cape of Good Hope as deputy quartermaster-general in 1821 and served as chief secretary to the colony's government from 1828. At that time his nephew Charles Davidson Bell held the post of Surveyor-General in the Cape Colony. He was appointed an aide-de-camp to King William IV of the United Kingdom in 1831 and was promoted to major-general in 1841. He joined the board of general officers in 1847 and was nominated Lieutenant Governor of Guernsey in the following year, holding that office until 1854.

Bell took command of the 95th (Derbyshire) Regiment of Foot in 1850 and became a lieutenant-general in 1851. A year later, he was advanced to a Knight Commander of the Bath. In 1853, he received colonelship of the 4th (The King's Own) Regiment of Foot, a command he held until his death in 1876. Bell was further honoured with the Order's Grand Cross in the 1860 Birthday Honours and was promoted to general in June.

== Family ==
In 1821, he married Catherine, eldest daughter of James Harris, 1st Earl of Malmesbury. His wife was born in St Petersburg and a godchild of Empress Catherine I of Russia. She died at Upper Hyde Park Street in London in 1855. Bell survived her until 1876, when he died, aged 94, at Cadogan Place. He was interred on Kensal Green Cemetery.

Government offices
Preceded by Sir William Napier	Lieutenant Governor of Guernsey; 1848–1854	Succeeded by Sir William Knollys
Military offices
Preceded by Sir Richard Armstrong	Colonel of the 95th (Derbyshire) Regiment of Foot; 1850–1853	Succeeded by Sir Francis Cockburn
Preceded by Sir Thomas Bradford	Colonel of the 4th (The King's Own) Regiment of Foot; 1853–1876	Succeeded by Studholme John Hodgson
