= 95th (Derbyshire) Regiment of Foot =

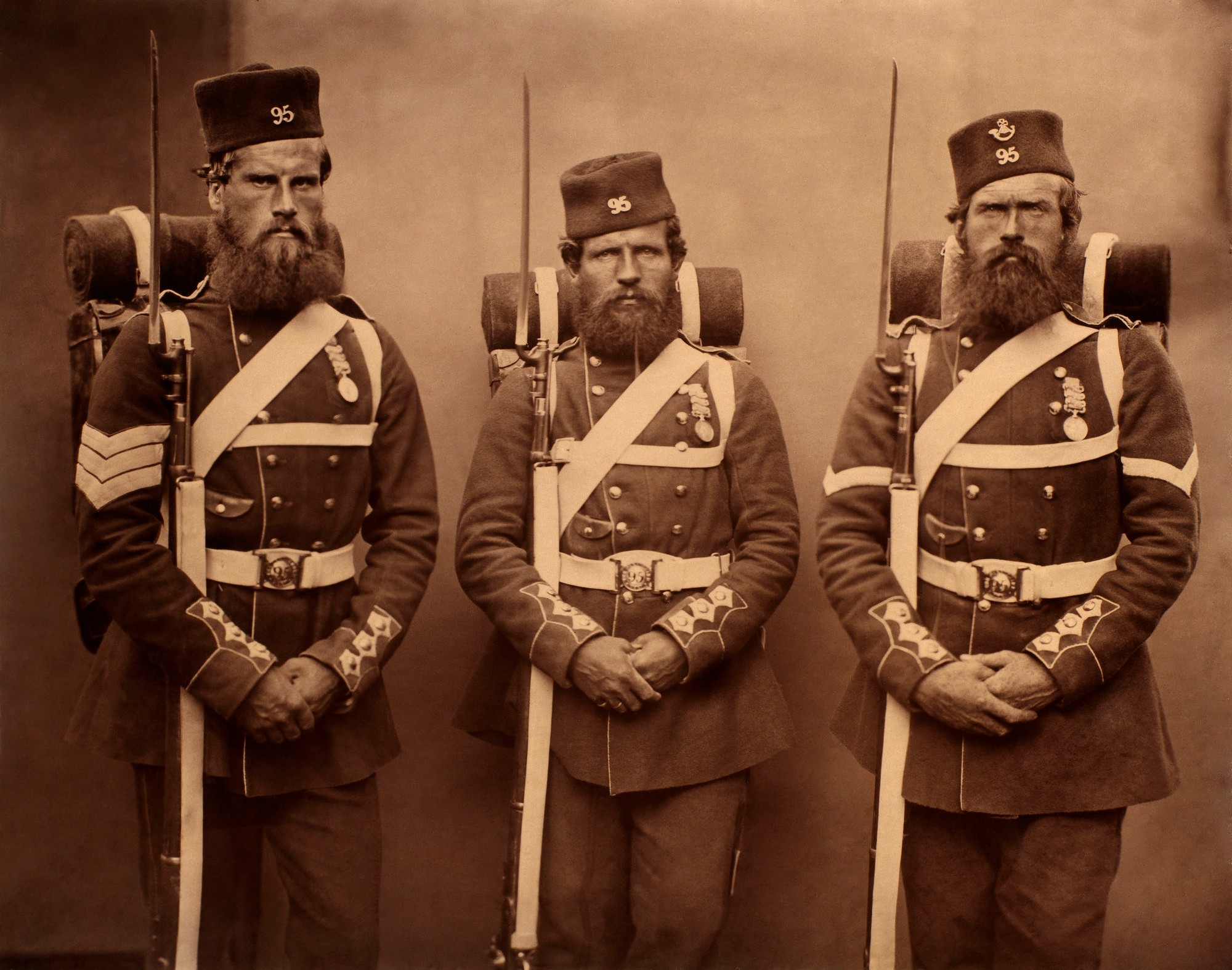
- 1856 photograph of three members of the 95th who fought in the Crimea: Sergeant John Geary, Thomas Onslow and Lance Corporal Patrick Carthay
- Active: 1823–1881
- Country: United Kingdom
- Branch: British Army
- Type: Line infantry
- Size: One battalion
- Garrison/HQ: Normanton Barracks, Derbyshire
- Nickname: The Nails
- Engagements: Crimean War; Indian Rebellion

The 95th (Derbyshire) Regiment of Foot was a British Army infantry regiment, raised in 1823. Under the Childers Reforms, it amalgamated with the 45th (Nottinghamshire) (Sherwood Foresters) Regiment of Foot to form the Sherwood Foresters in 1881.

== History ==
=== Formation ===
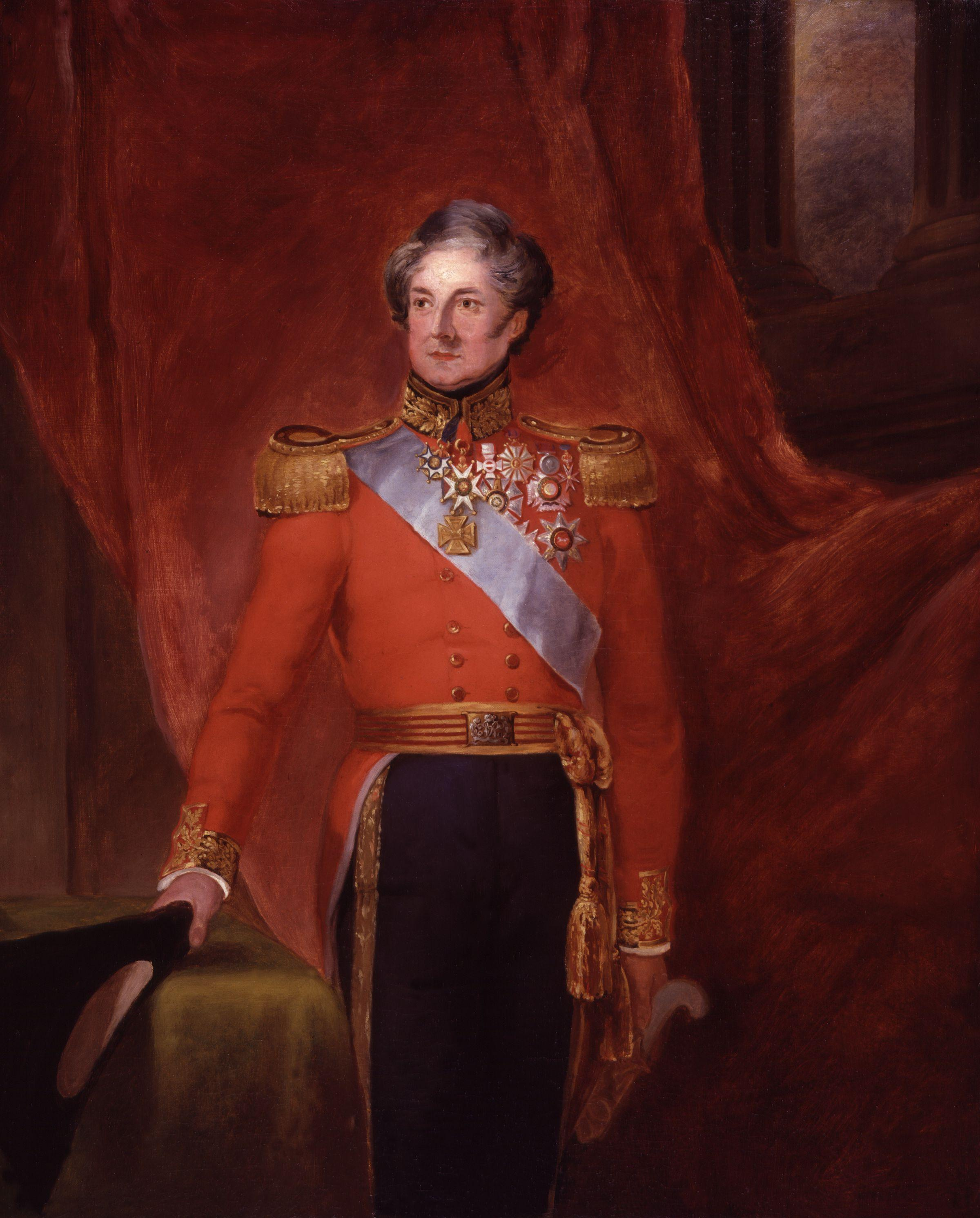
Sir Colin Halkett, who raised the regiment

The regiment was raised on 1 December 1823 by General Sir Colin Halkett as the 95th Regiment of Foot, (Note: The 95th Rifles had been redesignated as The Rifle Brigade on 23 February 1816) in response to the threat posed by the French intervention in Spain. It embarked for Malta in March 1824 and was given a territorial designation as the 95th (Derbyshire) Regiment of Foot in December 1825. It then sailed on to the Ionian Islands in January 1830; the headquarters was initially established in Corfu but moved to Vido in December 1831. The headquarters went back to Corfu in May 1832, to Cephalonia in April 1833 and back to Corfu again in June 1834. The regiment embarked for home in December 1834.

The regiment embarked for Ceylon in October 1838; the headquarters was initially established at Colombo but moved to Kandy in September 1841 and reverted to Colombo in January 1844. While in Colombo the regiment suffered from a serious epidemic of cholera: at least 63 soldiers died. The regiment transferred to Hong Kong in March 1847. In autumn 1848 the regiment lost nearly 40% of its strength to fever: representatives of Jardine Matheson provided extensive support in the form of the loan of boats and trips for convalescents. The regiment embarked for home in March 1850.

=== Crimea ===
The regiment embarked for Turkey in March 1854 for service in the Crimean War. It sailed on to Kalamita Bay in September 1854 and advanced under heavy Russian fire at the Battle of Alma later that month. Due to the heavy casualties suffered in this attack the Regimental colours, normally carried by an ensign, were seized by Private James Keenan: he planted them triumphantly on the earthwork of the Great Redoubt. (Note: The last British regiment to carry colours into action was the 58th (Rutlandshire) Regiment of Foot at Battle of Laing's Nek in 1881.) The regiment lost some 20 officers and some 180 other ranks in the battle. The regiment sustained further losses at the Battle of Inkerman in November 1854 and Major John Champion, who commanded the regiment during the battle, was killed in action. The regiment was also present at the Sevastopol in winter 1854: the regiment continued to sustain losses caused by the extreme cold and rampant disease. This led to the comment that: "there may be few of the 95th left but those few are as hard as nails." The regiment embarked for home in June 1856.

=== Indian Rebellion ===
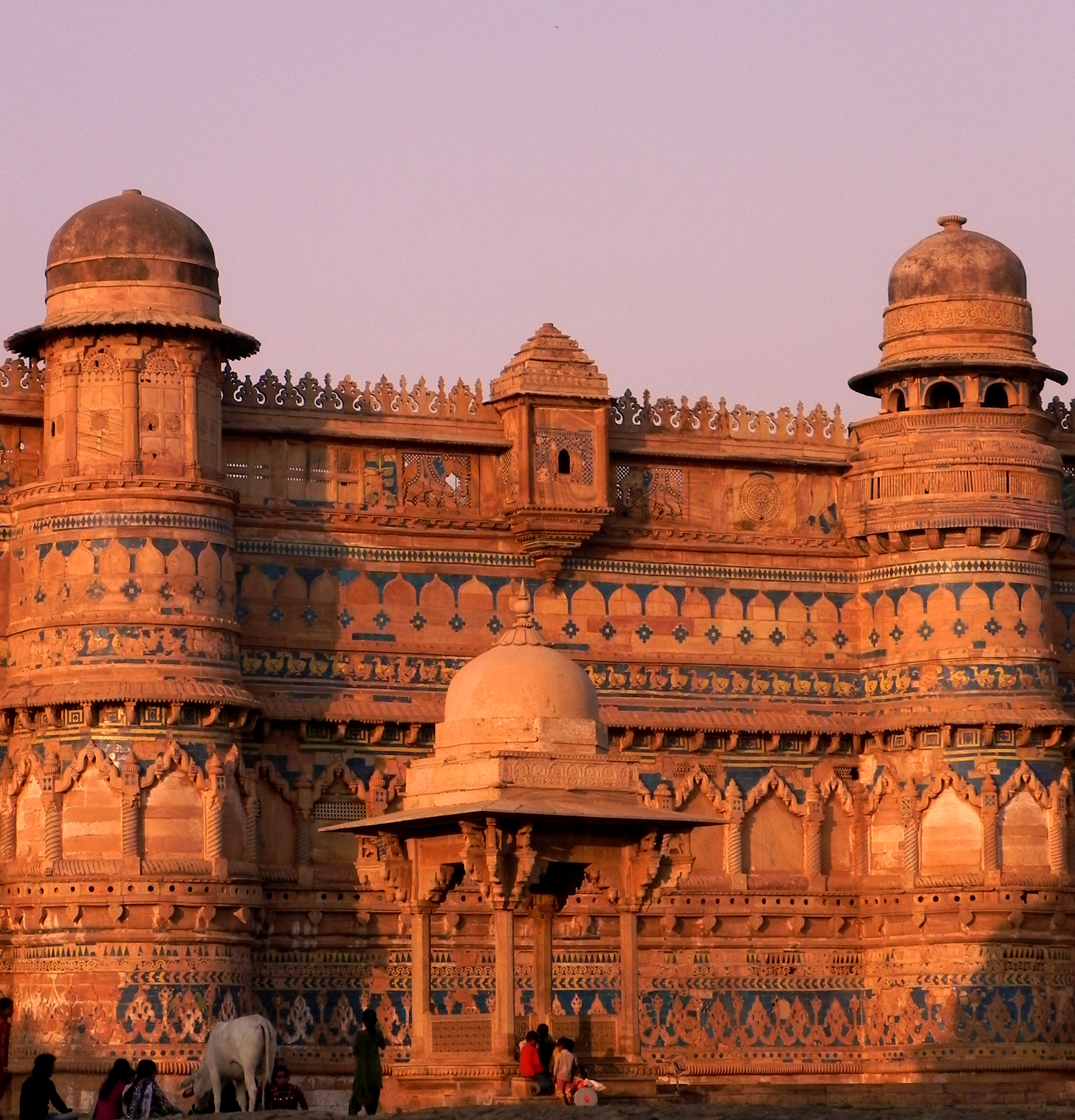
Gwalior Fort, recaptured by the regiment in June 1858

The regiment embarked for the Cape of Good Hope in June 1857 but, within days of arriving in September 1857, it was sent on to India to help suppress the Indian Rebellion. The regiment took part in the capture of the entrenched town of Rowa in January 1858: Private Bernard McQuirt was awarded the Victoria Cross for his part in the action. It went on to take part in a skirmish at Kotah-ke-Serai in June 1858 during which the rebel leader, Rani of Jhansi, was killed. It also took part in the recapture of Gwalior later that month as well as several other actions during the Central Indian campaign. The regiment remained in India until October 1870 when it sailed for England.

As part of the Cardwell Reforms of the 1870s, where single-battalion regiments were linked together to share a single depot and recruiting district in the United Kingdom, the 95th was linked with the 54th (West Norfolk) Regiment of Foot, and assigned to district no. 26 at Normanton Barracks in Derbyshire. On 1 July 1881 the Childers Reforms came into effect and the regiment amalgamated with the 45th (Nottinghamshire) (Sherwood Foresters) Regiment of Foot to form the Sherwood Foresters.

== Battle honours ==
The regiment's battle honours were as follows:

- Alma, Inkerman, Sevastopol, Central India

== Victoria Cross ==
- Private Bernard McQuirt Indian Mutiny (6 January 1858)

== Colonels of the Regiment ==
Colonels of the Regiment were:

=== The 95th Regiment of Foot ===
- 1823–1829: Gen. Sir Colin Halkett

=== The 95th (Derbyshire) Regiment of Foot - (1825) ===
- 1829–1834: Lt-Gen. Sir Archibald Campbell, 1st Baronet GCB (of Ava)
- 1834–1838: Lt-Gen. Sir Charles Pratt, KCB

=== The 95th (Derbyshire) Regiment - (1838) ===
- 1838–1843: Lt-Gen. Sir John Buchan, KCB
- 1843–1848: Lt-Gen. George Guy Carleton L'Estrange, CB
- 1848–1850: Lt-Gen. Sir Richard Armstrong KCB
- 1850–1853: Gen. Sir John Bell GCB
- 1853–1868: Gen. Sir Francis Cockburn
- 1868–1869: Gen. John ffolliott Crofton
- 1869–1871: Maj-Gen. Frederick Holt Robe, CB
- 1871–1876: Gen. James Pattoun Sparks, CB
- 1876–1881: Gen. John Studholme Brownrigg, CB

== Sources ==
- Wylly, Harold Carmichael (1929). History of the 1st & 2nd battalions, the Sherwood Foresters. Vol. 2. Butler & Tanner.
