= Edward Bulwer (British Army officer) =

British Army general (1829–1910)

General Sir Edward Bulwer GCB
- Born: 22 December 1829; Heydon, Norfolk
- Died: 8 December 1910 (aged 80); London
- Military career
- Allegiance: United Kingdom
- Branch: British Army
- Service years: 1849–1896
- Rank: General
- Conflicts: Crimean War; Indian Mutiny
- Awards: Knight Grand Cross of the Order of the Bath

General Sir Edward Earle Gascoyne Bulwer GCB (22 December 1829 – 8 December 1910) was a British Army officer who became Lieutenant Governor of Guernsey.

== Military career ==
Educated at Trinity College, Cambridge, Bulwer was commissioned into the Royal Welch Fusiliers in 1849. He served in the Crimea War and took part in the Battle of Alma in 1854. He then took part in the Relief of Lucknow during the Indian Mutiny. He was appointed Assistant Inspector of Reserve Forces in Scotland in 1865, Assistant Adjutant-General for Recruiting in Scotland in 1870 and Assistant Adjutant-General for Auxiliary Forces at Army Headquarters in 1873. He went on to be General Officer Commanding Chatham District in 1879, Inspector-General of Recruiting at Army Headquarters in 1880 and Deputy Adjutant-General to the Forces in 1886.

He was appointed Lieutenant Governor of Guernsey in 1889. He retired in 1896. In retirement he was Colonel of the Royal Welch Fusiliers and Honorary Colonel of the 3rd (1st Norfolk Militia) Battalion, Norfolk Regiment.

== Family ==
In 1863, he married Isabella Buxton; they had one son and four daughters. Edward Bulwer was the nephew of Henry Bulwer, 1st Baron Dalling and Bulwer, nephew of Edward Bulwer-Lytton, 1st Baron Lytton and brother of Henry Ernest Gascoyne Bulwer.

Government offices
Preceded by John Elkington	Lieutenant Governor of Guernsey; 1889–1894	Succeeded by Nathaniel Stevenson
