= Richard Armstrong (British Army officer) =

British general

Lieutenant-General Sir Richard Armstrong KCB
- Born: c. 1782
- Died: 3 March 1854
- Military career
- Allegiance: United Kingdom
- Branch: British Army
- Rank: Lieutenant-General
- Commands: Madras Army
- Conflicts: Peninsular War; First Anglo-Burmese War
- Awards: Knight Commander of the Order of the Bath

Lieutenant-General Sir Richard Armstrong, KCB (c. 1782 – 3 March 1854) was an officer in the British Army.

== Military career ==
Armstrong was the only son of Lt.-Col. Richard Armstrong of Lincoln. Armstrong was commissioned as an ensign in 1796. He served in the Peninsular War and in the First Anglo-Burmese War. He became commander of the British forces in Canada West in 1842 and, after serving in that post until 1848, went on to be Commander-in-Chief of the Madras Army in 1851. He resigned due to poor health in early 1854 and died shortly afterwards. He was also colonel of the 95th Regiment of Foot and then colonel of the 32nd Regiment of Foot.

Military offices
Preceded by Sir George Berkeley	C-in-C, Madras Army; 1851–1853	Succeeded by William Staveley
Preceded by Sir John Buchan	Colonel of the 32nd (Cornwall) Regiment of Foot; 1850–1854	Succeeded by Sir Willoughby Cotton
Preceded by George L'Estrange	Colonel of the 95th (Derbyshire) Regiment of Foot; 1848–1850	Succeeded by John Bell
