= Alexander Nelson (British Army officer) =

British Army general (1814–1893)

Lieutenant-General Sir Alexander Nelson KCB JP
- Born: 30 June 1814; Walmer, Kent
- Died: 28 September 1893 (aged 79); Reading, Berkshire
- Military career
- Allegiance: United Kingdom
- Branch: British Army
- Service years: 1835–1883
- Rank: Lieutenant-General
- Commands: Conquest of Sindh; Morant Bay rebellion
- Awards: Knight Commander of the Order of the Bath

Lieutenant-General Sir Alexander Abercromby Nelson KCB JP (30 June 1814 – 28 September 1893) was a British Army officer who became Lieutenant Governor of Guernsey.

== Military career ==
Educated at the Royal Military College, Sandhurst, Nelson was commissioned into the 40th Regiment of Foot as an ensign in 1835. He served in Kandahar and in Afghanistan in 1841 and 1842 and took part in the Battle of Hyderabad in 1843 during the Conquest of Sindh. He was appointed Deputy Assistant Adjutant-General at Portsmouth in 1854 and subsequently became brigade major there before being made Deputy Adjutant-General in Jamaica in 1864. He was responsible for putting down the Morant Bay rebellion there, ordering the trial of George Gordon who was subsequently hanged in 1865. He went on to be Assistant Adjutant-General for Cork district in 1867 and Adjutant-General in Gibraltar in 1873. He became Lieutenant Governor of Guernsey in 1879.

== Family ==
In 1846 he married Emma Georgiana Hibbert.

Government offices
Preceded by Sir St. George Foley	Lieutenant Governor of Guernsey; 1879–1883	Succeeded by Henry Sarel
