= William Staveley =

British Army officer (1784–1854)

Lieutenant-General William Staveley CB
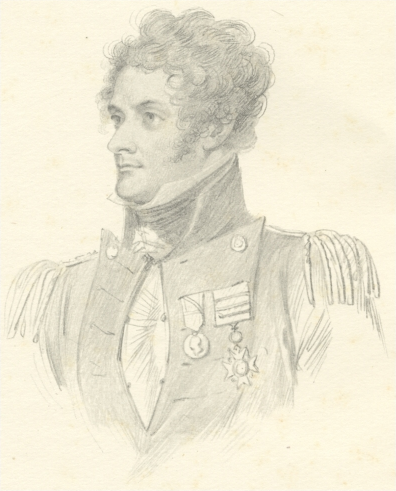
- Born: 05 June 1783
- Died: 4 April 1854 (aged 69)
- Military career
- Allegiance: United Kingdom
- Branch: British Army
- Rank: Lieutenant-General
- Commands: Commander and Lieutenant Governor of Hong Kong; Bombay Army; Madras Army
- Conflicts: Peninsular War
- Awards: Companion of the Order of the Bath

Lieutenant-General William Staveley CB (5 June 1784 – 4 April 1854) was a British Army officer, who fought in the Peninsular War, and later became Commander and Lieutenant Governor of Hong Kong.

== Military career ==
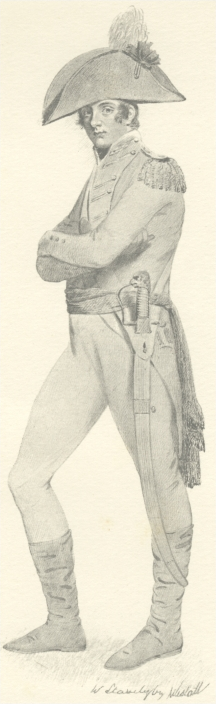
William Staveley, Caithness Legion

Staveley was born in York, the son of William Staveley and Henrietta Henderson. He entered the British Army in 1798 as an ensign. Staveley fought in several conflicts in the Peninsular War (viz. Battle of Talavera, Battle of Fuentes de Onoro, Battle of Vittoria, Battle of the Pyrenees, Battle of Toulouse, Siege of Ciudad Rodrigo, Battle of Badajoz) and also engaged in many other minor actions.

At the 1815 Battle of Waterloo, Staveley was present as a captain in the Royal Staff Corps, afterwards receiving the Companion of the Bath (CB) and a promotion to brevet Lieutenant-Colonel.

He went to Mauritius in 1821, and served in various roles (including deputy quartermaster-general, and commandant of Port Louis) before becoming Commander and Lieutenant Governor of Hong Kong in 1847.

After leaving Hong Kong in 1851, he was given command of the Bombay Army. In 1853, he was made Colonel of the 24th Regiment of Foot, and appointed commander-in-chief of the Madras Army (with local rank of lieutenant-general). He died in the Nilgiri Hills, and was buried at Ootacamund.

== Staveley Street ==
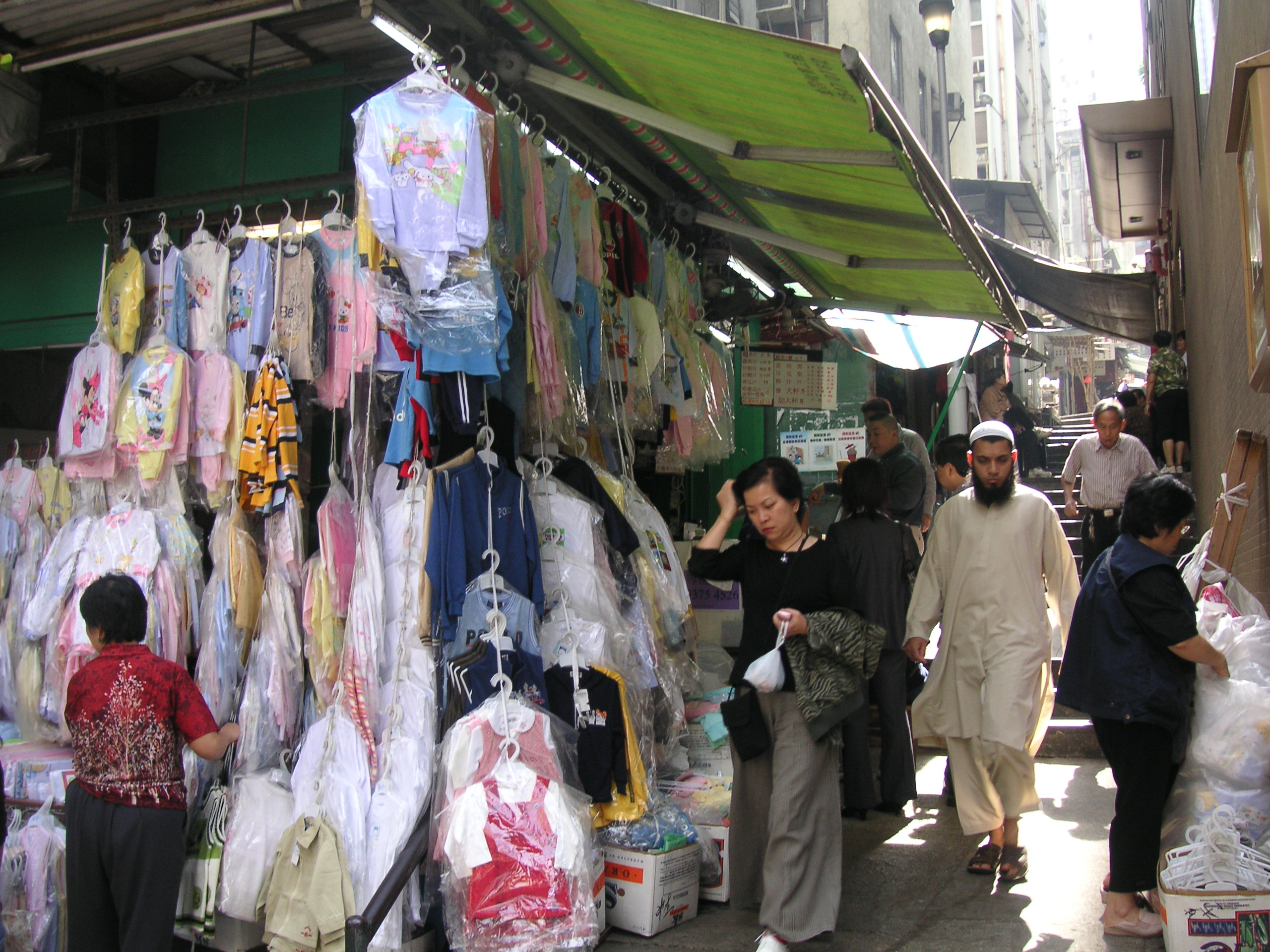
Staveley Street, near Queen's Road Central

Staveley Street (Chinese: 士他花利街; Cantonese Yale: si6 ta1 fa1 lei6 gaai1; pinyin: Shìtāhuālì Jiē) is a ladder street in Central, Hong Kong Island. It is named after William Staveley, and runs parallel to Peel Street.

== Family ==
William Staveley married Sarah Mather in 1817. Their children included Charles William Dunbar Staveley, Harriet Frances Staveley, and Caroline Octavia Emma Staveley, who married Talavera Vernon Anson RN in 1847.

Military offices
Preceded by Sir George D'Aguilar	Commander and Lieutenant Governor of Hong Kong; 1848–1851	Succeeded by William Jervois
Preceded by Sir Richard Armstrong	C-in-C, Madras Army; 1853–1854	Succeeded by George Anson
Preceded by Sir William Warre	Colonel of the 94th Regiment of Foot; 1853–1854	Succeeded by Henry Thomas
