= Henry Sarel =

Lieutenant-General Henry Sarel CB
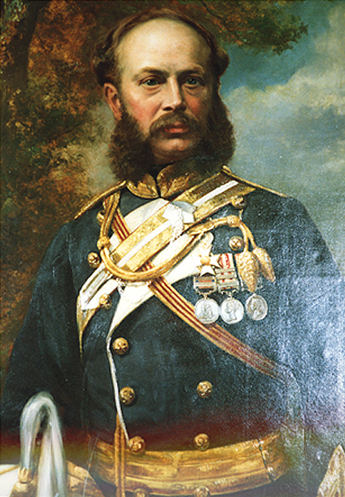
- Born: 1 November 1823; London, England
- Died: 2 January 1887 (aged 63); Rollesby Hall, Norfolk
- Military career
- Allegiance: United Kingdom
- Branch: British Army
- Service years: 1847–1885
- Rank: Lieutenant-General
- Conflicts: Indian Mutiny; Second Opium War
- Awards: Companion of the Order of the Bath

Lieutenant-General Henry Andrew Sarel CB (1 November 1823 – 2 January 1887) was a British Army officer who became Lieutenant Governor of Guernsey.

== Military career ==
Educated at Rugby School, Sarel became a cornet with the 9th Queen's Royal Lancers in 1847 and subsequently transferred to the 17th Lancers. He fought with his Regiment during the Indian Mutiny in 1857 and then joined the China Expedition in 1861. He was appointed Lieutenant Governor of Guernsey in 1883 and lived at Rollesby Hall in Norfolk.

== Family ==
He married Phyllis Molyneux.

Government offices
Preceded by Sir Alexander Nelson	Lieutenant Governor of Guernsey; 1883–1885	Succeeded by John Elkington
