= Charles Davidson Bell =

Scottish-born artist (1813–1882)

Charles Davidson Bell FRSE
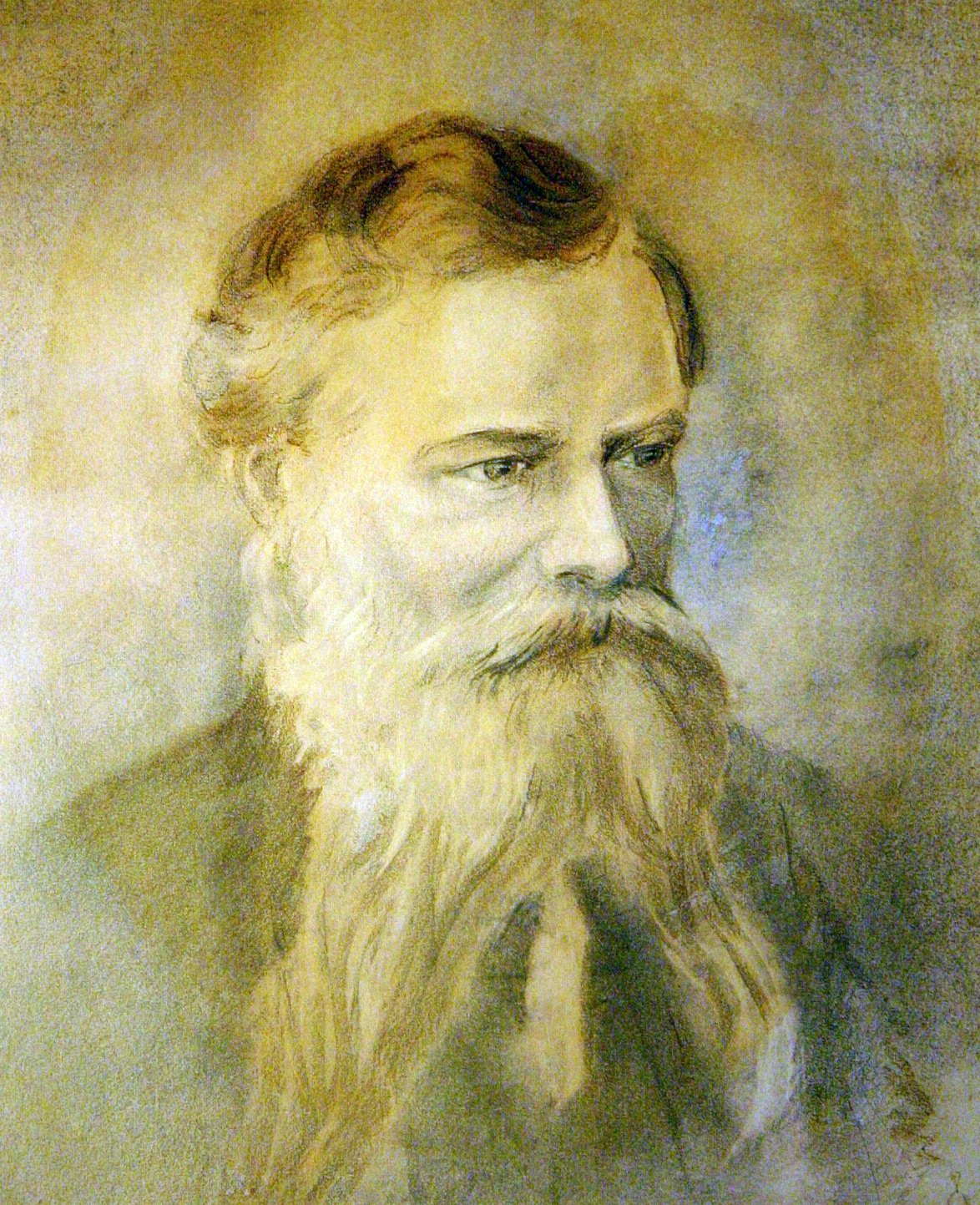
- A self-portrait by Bell
- Born: 22 October 1813; Crail, Fife, Scotland
- Died: 7 April 1882 (aged 68)
- Education: St Andrews University
- Known for: Stamp design, painting
- Notable work: South Africa College arms
- Spouses: Martha Ebden (m. 1841; div. 1850); Helena Krynauw (m. 1859)
- Children: 8
- Relatives: John Bell (uncle)

Charles Davidson Bell FRSE (22 October 1813 – 7 April 1882) was a Scottish-born artist who spent the majority of his life in the Cape Colony. In addition to serving as the Surveyor-General of the colony, he was also a heraldist who designed several of the Cape Colony's medals and stamps.

== Life ==
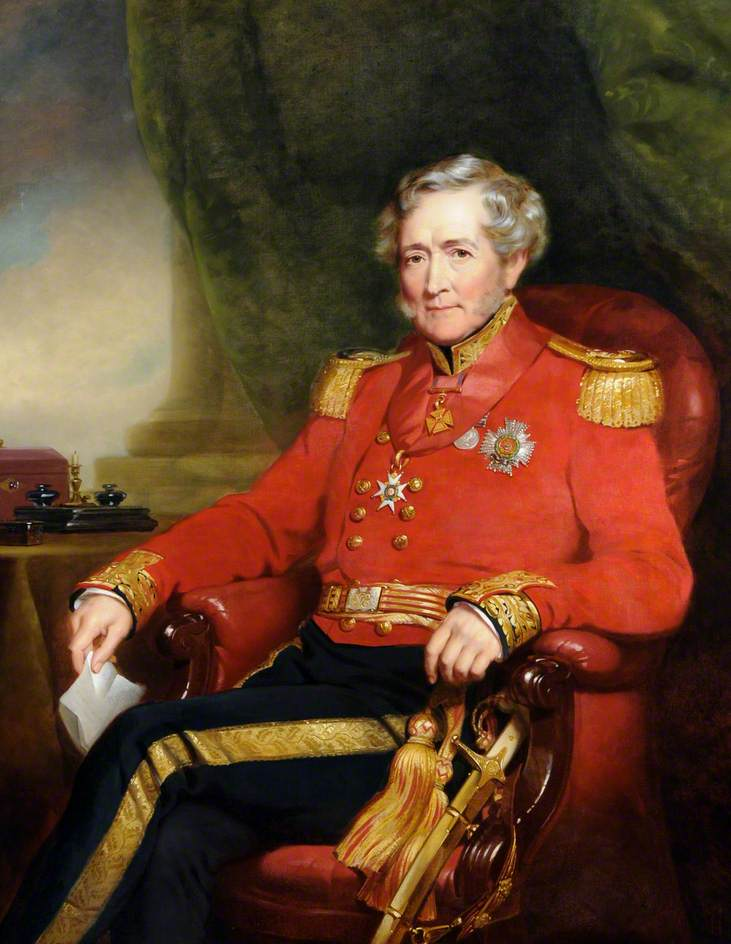
A portrait of Bell's uncle, Sir John Bell

Born on 22 October 1813 at Newhall, Crail, Fife, Scotland, he was educated locally at St Andrews University.

Bell left Scotland and sailed to South Africa, landing at the Cape of Good Hope in 1830 and through his uncle Sir John Bell, Secretary to the Cape Government, was given a post in the civil service. He was appointed as expedition artist on Dr. Andrew Smith's two-year journey north as far as the Limpopo in 1834. He went from Acting Clerk of the Legislative Council in 1838, to Assistant Surveyor-General in 1843, to Surveyor-General in 1848.

In 1851, he designed a silver gallantry medal for Cape governor Sir Harry Smith to present to troops during the 8th Frontier War. This is often referred to as the first South African medal.

Appointed to the Postal Enquiry Board in 1852, he designed the well-known Cape of Good Hope triangular stamp, the first of that shape. It became extremely rare and consequently much sought after by philatelists. His design of rectangular stamps remained in use until 1902.

Many of his sketches and paintings show a whimsical sense of humour, though his sensitive portrayals of the mixed population of Cape Town and of the tribes he encountered on the Smith expedition to the north, have become an invaluable record of life in 19th-century South Africa. The return of many of his paintings from England to South Africa in 1978, gave art historians a fresh appreciation of his work and greater insight into that period of Cape history. However, in his essay "Alcohol and Art", Russel Viljoen, professor in history at the University of South Africa wrote:

International interest in the 'Hottentots' (Khoikhoi) of South Africa date back and span many centuries. Recurrent colonial encounters influenced the way in which artists, engravers, travel writers and colonial observers represented the Khoikhoi people. Against this backdrop, the colonial artist Charles Davidson Bell had produced a few sketches of Khoikhoi men and women, depicting them either as useless drunkards or lazy members of Cape society ... the duplication and re-duplication of these stereotyped images distributed as 'pictorial souvenirs' in the form of 201 postcards invariably left an imprint of negativity in the psyche of the colonial beholder.

— Russel Viljoen,

Bell also made an important contribution to heraldry in South Africa. Throughout his residence at the Cape, he copied old Dutch/Afrikaner coats of arms from memorials, seals, stained glass windows, and other artefacts, and in 1861 he advertised his intention of publishing them in book form. The book did not see the light of day, but he later gave the manuscript, the drawings, and his notes to his brother-in-law Daniel Krynauw. Krynauw built up his own heraldry collection, and after his death, the two collections were placed in a Cape Town museum, from where they were transferred to the South African Library (now National Library of South Africa - Cape Town Campus) in 1946. The material in the Bell-Krynauw Collection was eventually published in Cornelis Pama's Die Wapens van die Ou Afrikaanse Families (1959), and his later heraldry books.

Bell designed the arms of the South African College (now University of Cape Town). He also designed the "three anchors" badge of the South African Mutual Life Assurance Society ("Old Mutual"), of which he was chairman at one time. Both emblems are still in use, and may well be the oldest academic arms and corporate logo in South Africa.

Bell was a founder member and chairman of the South African Mutual Life Assurance Society. At the Cape Town First Exhibition of Fine Art in February 1851, he was awarded a gold medal for best original historical painting in oil for Landing of van Riebeeck at the Cape of Good Hope in 1652. A large number of his originals hang in the Library of Parliament in Cape Town, the University of the Witwatersrand and the Africana Museum in Johannesburg. The book Travels in the Interior of South Africa (1868) by James Chapman, was illustrated by Bell. His Reports of the Surveyor-General, Charles D. Bell Esq., on the copper fields of Little Namaqualand (1855) was written after a three-month visit to the area. He gave his name to the town of Bellville in the Cape, and Bell, a small village between Peddie and Hamburg, near the mouth of the Keiskamma River in the Eastern Cape.

John Bell was a traveller and the eldest son of Charles Davidson Bell. Between 1861 and 1862 he accompanied Henry Samuel Chapman (Note: Henry Samuel Chapman was born on 4 August 1834 at Cape Town in South Africa. He was a hunter and trader. He was a brother to James Chapman (Jnr.) He arrived at Walvis Bay by sea in February 1860, and travelled extensively between Walvis Bay, Ovamboland, Hereroland, Lake Ngami and the Cape until 1863. Later he lived at Oudtshoorn, Kimberley and Johannesburg. He died on 9 August 1922 at Braamfontein in South Africa.) from Cape Town to Walvis Bay, through Hereroland to Lake Ngami and back to the Cape Colony via Shoshong, Kuruman and Hopetown. He was married to Margaret Roome in 1865 and died in 1878 in England.

== Death and legacy ==
Charles Bell was a friend of Andrew Geddes Bain and was a pall-bearer at his funeral in 1864.

After his retirement in 1872 he returned to Scotland in 1873. He lived there with Helena and their 3 surviving children, where Helena Bell died on 10 September 1881 and he died on 7 April 1882.

A collection of his paintings is held at the University of Cape Town. This collection is run by Bell’s grandson, Professor Charles Manning.

== Family life ==
Charles Davidson Bell's coat of arms

Bell married Martha Antoinette Ebden on 3 June 1841.

1. John Alexander Bell born 25 January 1843 in Grahamstown
2. Charles David Ebden Bell born 1 August 1845 in Cape Town
3. Catherine Mariann Bell born 16 December 1848 at Canigou, Rondebosch, Cape Town died 16 July 1863

Charles Bell divorced Martha Ebden on 1 July 1850 having cited Dr. Lestock Wilson Stewart as co-respondent. Court granted Charles Bell custody of the three children - Martha gave birth to second daughter Charlotte Margaret on 17 October 1850 - Bell denied paternity. Charlotte Margaret died before 10 April 1866.

Bell's second marriage was to Helena Krynauw on 7 July 1859.

1. Helena Isabella Bell born 31 May 1860 in Cape Town
2. Alexander Bell born 15 September 1861 in Cape Town
3. Anthony Bell born 9 February 1863 in Cape Town
4. David Duncan Traill Bell born 21 April 1864 Cape Town died 14 December 1865
5. Catherine Susan Bell born 11 May 1865 Cape Town died 13 September 1865

== Artwork ==
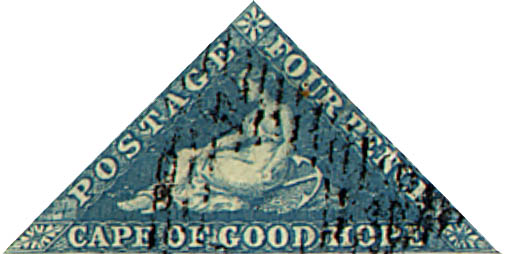
A Cape Colony stamp designed by Bell

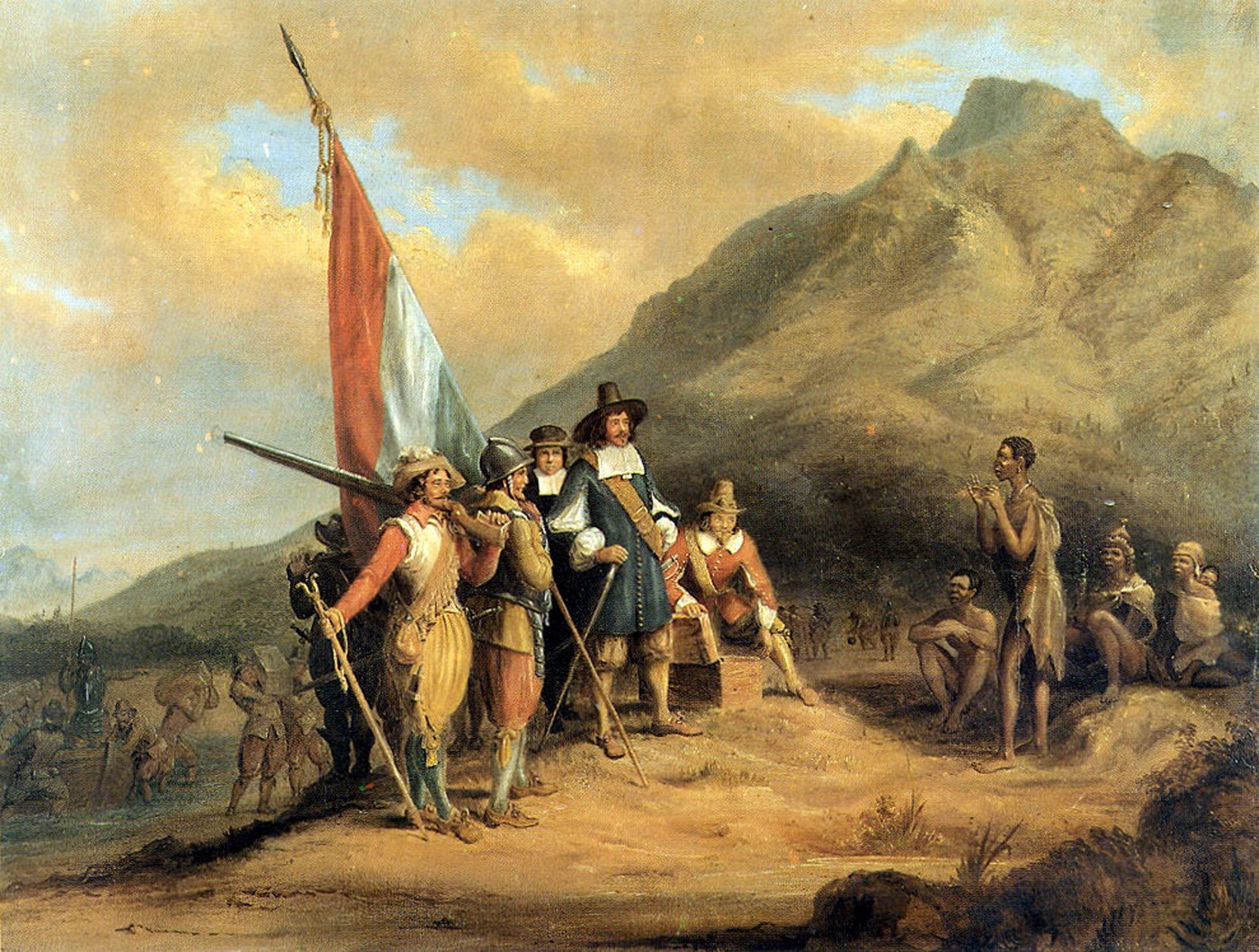
Landing of van Riebeeck at the Cape of Good Hope in 1652

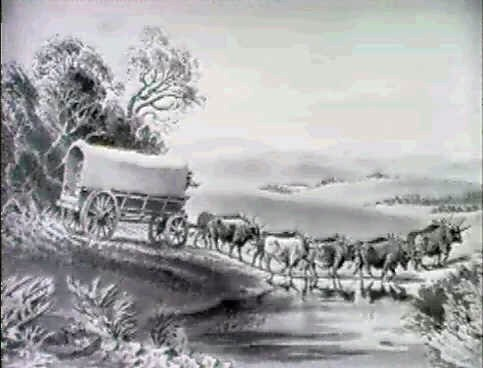
Cape Wagon Crossing a River

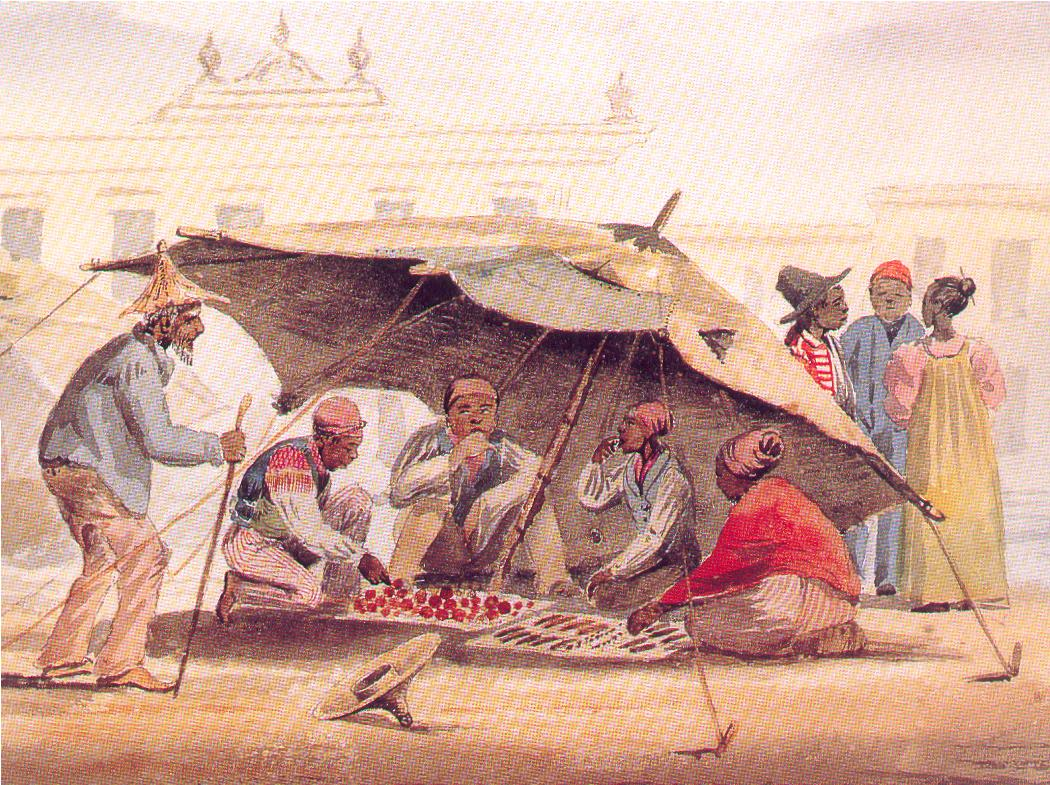
Cape Coloureds

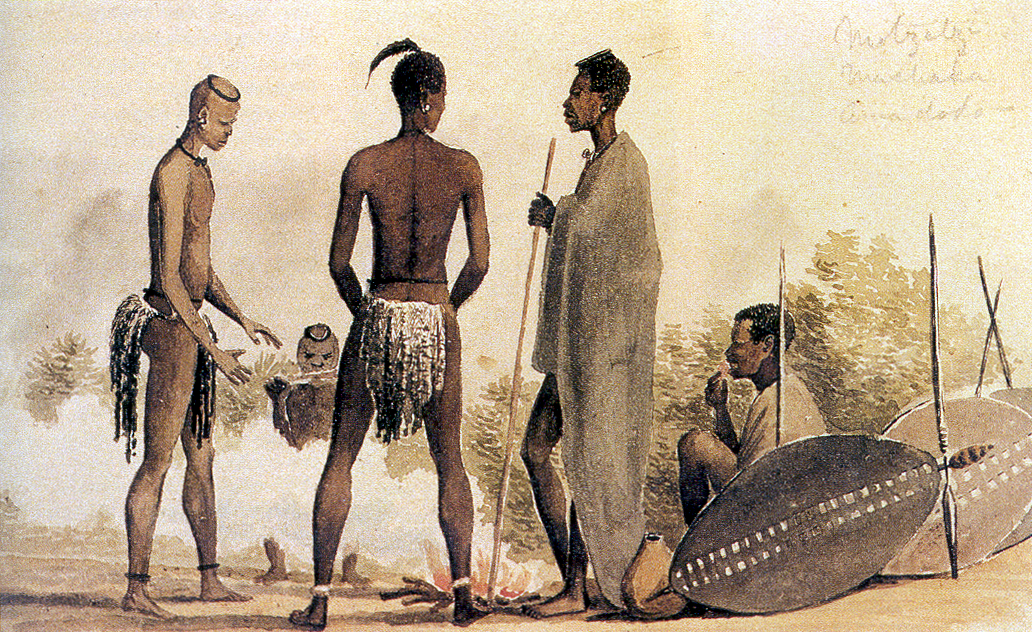
Our Zoola Guard of Honour

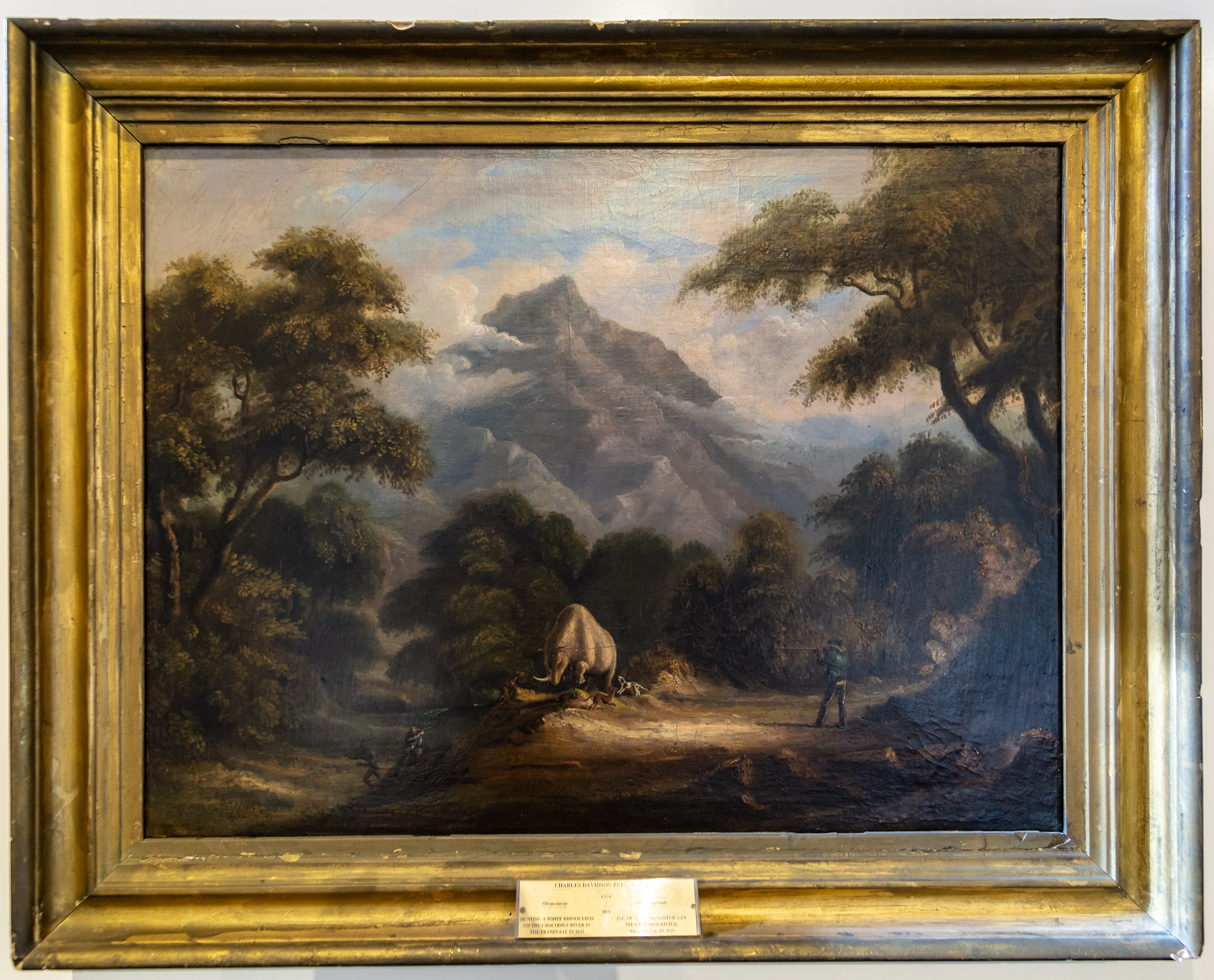
Hunting a White Rhinoceros on the Crocodile River

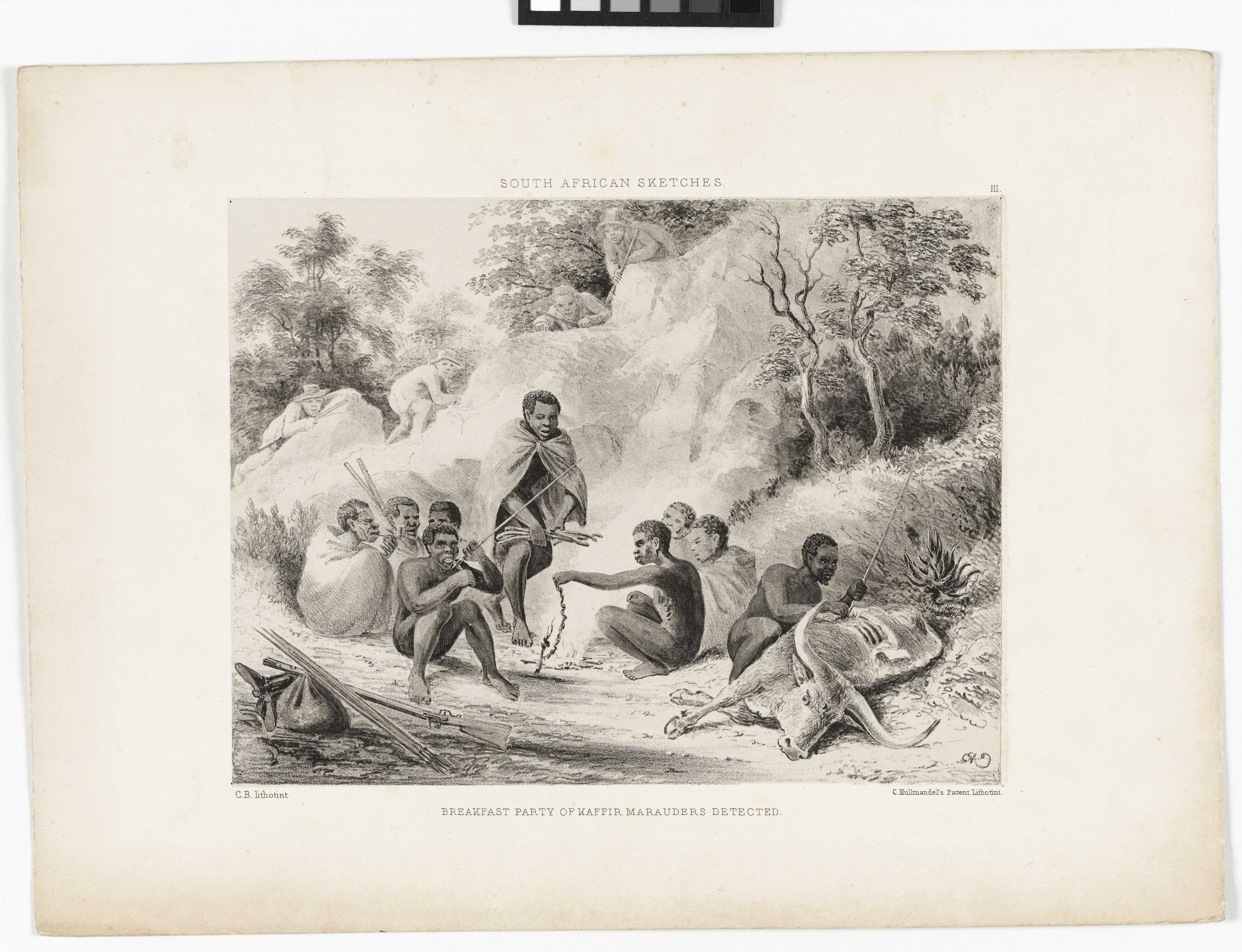
Breakfast Party of Kaffir

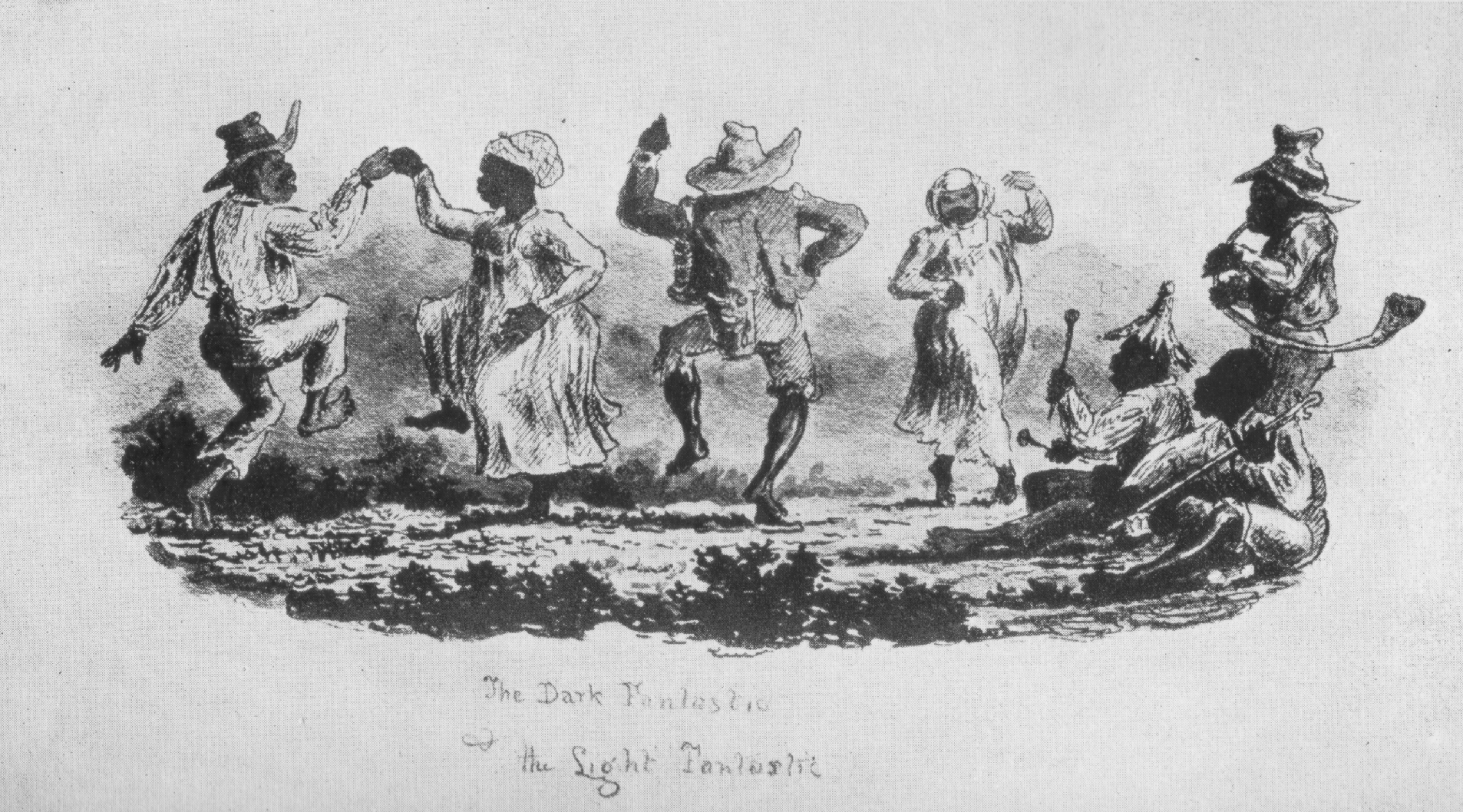
The Dark Fantastic

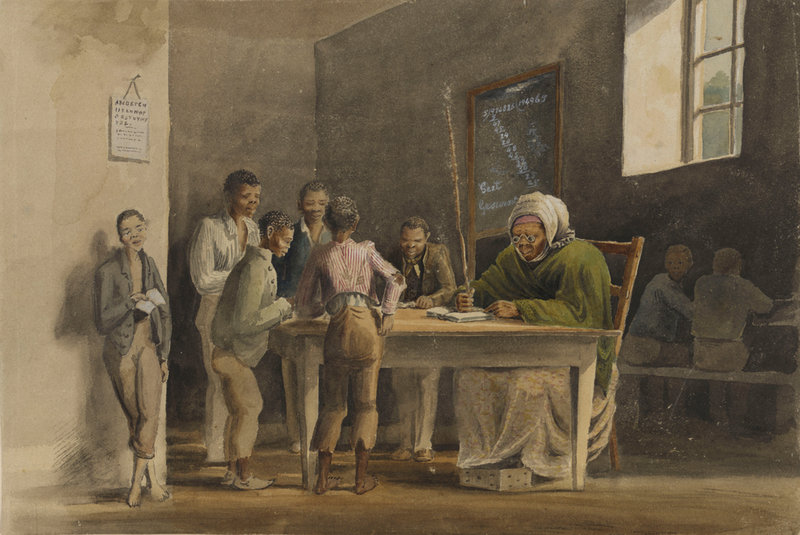
Education in the Early Days at the Cape

== Notes and references ==
- Standard Encyclopaedia of Southern Africa (vol.2) (NASOU Cape Town 1970)
- The Life and Work of Charles Bell – Phillida Brooke Simons (Fernwood Press, Cape Town 1998) ISBN 1-874950-34-2
- Die Wapens van die Ou Afrikaanse Families – C. Pama (1959)
- Heraldry of South African Families – C. Pama (1972)
- Die Groot Afrikaanse Familienaamboek – C. Pama (1983).
