= Edward Charles Frome =

Australian politician

General Edward Charles Frome
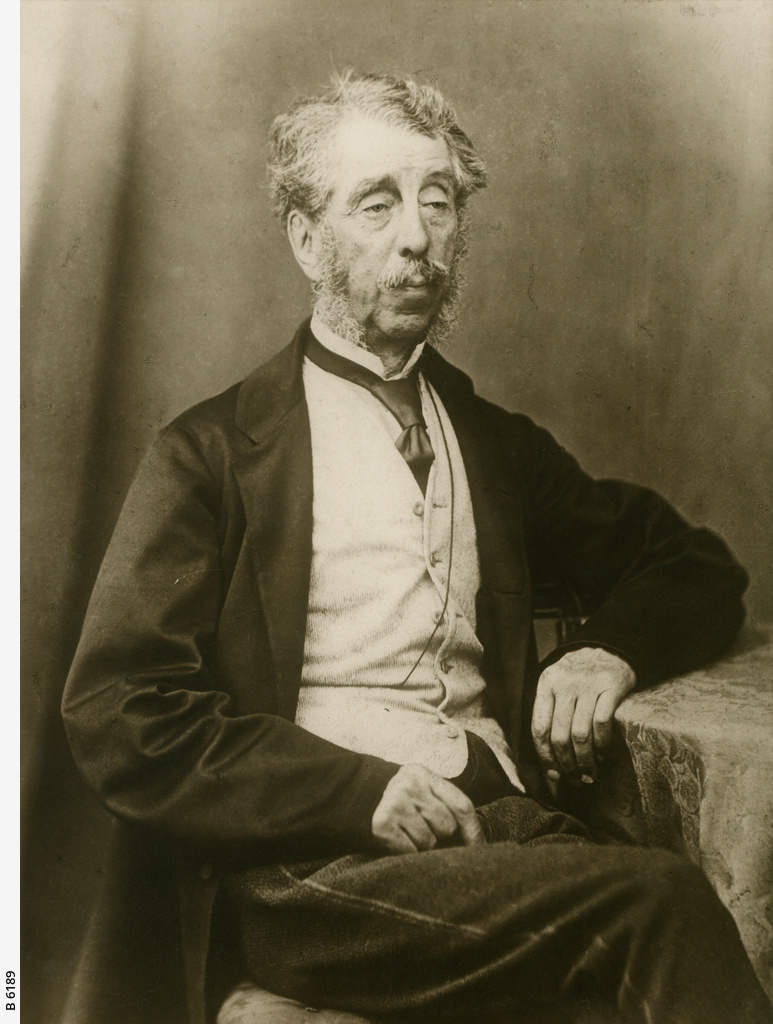
- Edward Charles Frome

Lieutenant Governor of Guernsey
- In office 1 May 1869 – 1 May 1874
- Preceded by: Charles Rochfort Scott
- Succeeded by: Sir St George Foley

Surveyor General of South Australia
- In office 4 October 1839 – February 1849
- Preceded by: Captain Charles Sturt
- Succeeded by: Sir Arthur Freeling

Member of the Legislative Council of South Australia
- In office 2 October 1839 – 14 June 1843

Personal details
- Born: 7 January 1802 Gibraltar
- Died: 2 November 1890 (aged 88) Ewell, Surrey

Military service
- Allegiance: United Kingdom
- Branch/service: British Army
- Rank: General

General Edward Charles Frome (7 January 1802 – 2 November 1890) was a British Army officer and Surveyor General of South Australia.

== Early life ==
Born in Gibraltar on 7 January 1802, Frome was orphaned early in his life. He was educated in Blackheath, London, England, where he became a close friend of Benjamin Disraeli.

== Career ==
He received his commission in the Royal Engineers in 1825. He was involved in the Rideau Canal construction in Canada in 1827 to 1833.

In September 1839 Frome arrived in South Australia on the ship Recovery to take up an appointment as the colony's third Surveyor General. He was also a member of the South Australian Legislative Council (2 October 1839 to 14 June 1843). He made an important contribution in surveying large areas of South Australia for new immigrants to settle upon.

He was also a competent artist and made many sketches and paintings of landscapes on his surveying expeditions. In one of his sketchbooks, there is a sketch of a Milmenrura village in the south-east of South Australia consisting of a cluster of about twelve established Aboriginal homes. It is annotated with the note "burnt by me, October 1840". This was apparently part of the retribution for the Maria massacre of shipwrecked survivors a few months earlier.

In 1843 he led an expedition to the mid-north of South Australia and was the first to accurately map Lake Frome.

After his ten-year term expired he returned to England and was subsequently stationed in Mauritius, Scotland and Gibraltar. Between 1869 and 1874 he served as Lieutenant Governor of Guernsey.

== Later life and legacy ==
He retired in 1877 with the army rank of general, and died on 2 November 1890 at Ewell in Surrey.

His name was given to two lakes – Lake Frome in the state's north-east and Lake Frome in the state's south-east; Frome River in the Lake Eyre basin; and Frome Road, a major thoroughfare in Adelaide.

The South Australian Electoral district of Frome, named after him, has existed in several incarnations since 1884. The latest incarnation has existed since 1991, but in 2024 the Electoral Districts Boundaries Commission announced that at the 2026 state election its name would be changed to Ngadjuri, due to concerns over Frome's involvement in acts of retribution following the Maria massacre.

== See also ==
- History of Adelaide
- Water Witch (1835 cutter)

Government offices
Preceded by Charles Rochfort Scott	Lieutenant Governor of Guernsey; 1869–1874	Succeeded by Sir St. George Foley
