= John Crofton (British Army officer) =

British Army officer

General John ffolliott Crofton (9 October 1800 – 17 July 1885) was a British Army officer.

He was born in Dublin, Ireland, the son of Revd Henry Crofton and Frances ffolliott. Educated privately, he gained a BA degree at Trinity College, Dublin in 1824.

He entered the army the same year as an ensign in the 6th Foot. In 1832 he was appointed interpreter under Brigadier-General Litchfield for a military campaign in a lawless area of north-west India. He was also involved in the defence of Aden in 1841. In 1846, by now promoted Major, he was posted to North America in charge of an expedition to the Red River settlement in Prince Rupert's Land. The Hudson's Bay Company had requested military assistance to protect the settlers from American incursions in the event of war over the Oregon Territory. By the time the regiment arrived the Oregon crisis had been resolved and the troops undertook policing operations against illegal fur traders.

He returned to England in 1847 and worked at the War Office. He was promoted colonel in 1854, major-general in 1861, lieutenant-general in 1870, and general in 1877.

From 1868 to 1869 he was Colonel of the 95th (Derbyshire) Regiment and from 1869 to his death Colonel of the 6th Foot, now newly renamed the Royal Warwickshire Regiment. He retired from the army in 1881 and died in London in 1885. He had married Anne Agnes Addison of Preston and had 4 sons and a daughter.
