= Attorney General Foley =

Attorney General Foley may refer to:

- Matt Foley (politician) (born 1951), Attorney-General of Queensland
- Roger D. Foley (1917–1996), Attorney General of Nevada

== See also ==
- General Foley (disambiguation)
