= Lieutenant Governor of Guernsey =

Representative of the British monarch in Guernsey

- Coat of arms of Guernsey

- Flag of the lieutenant governor of Guernsey

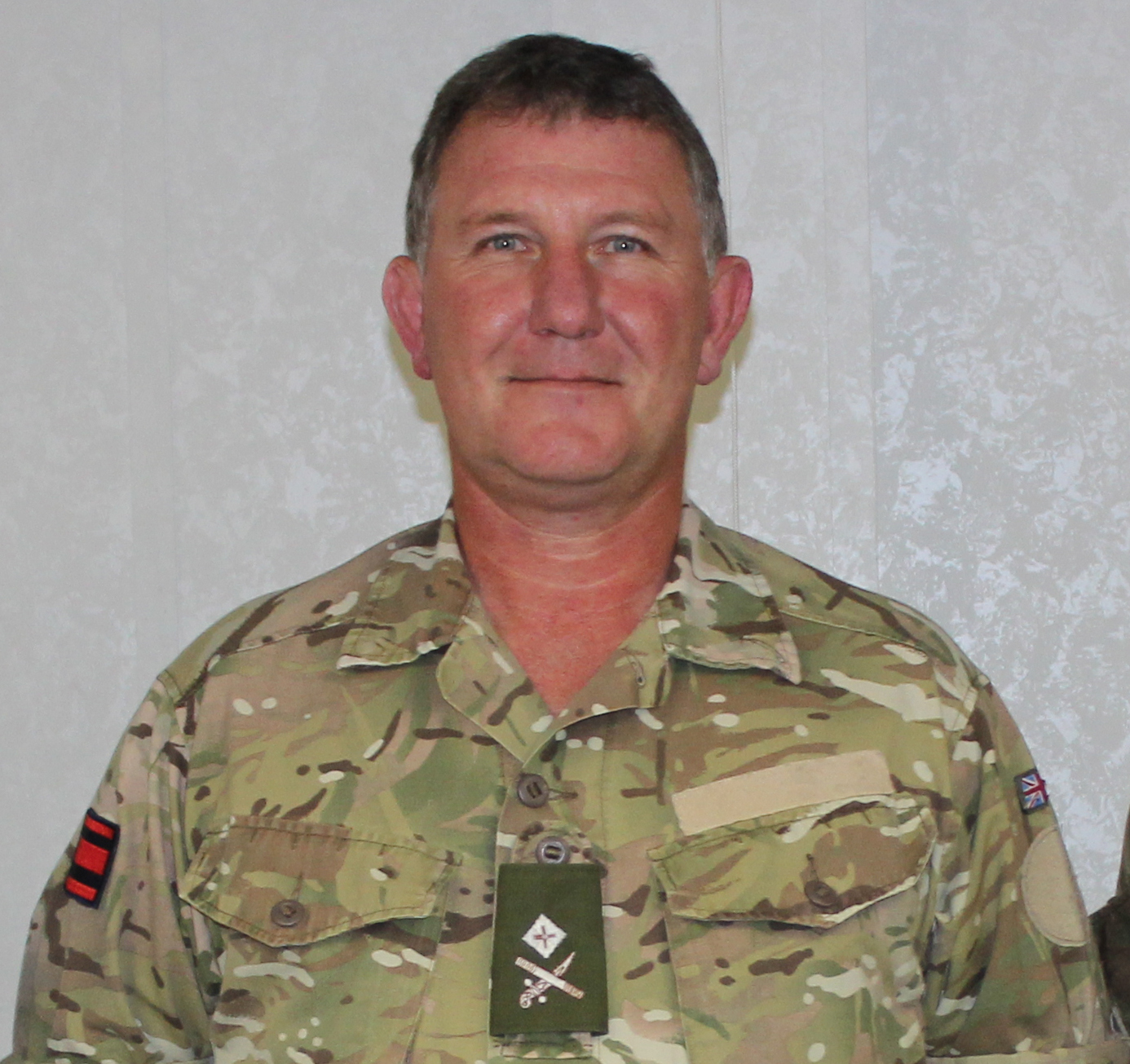
- Incumbent; Lieutenant General Richard Cripwell since 15 February 2022
- Style: His Excellency
- Appointer: Monarch of the United Kingdom
- Term length: At His Majesty's Pleasure
- Website: www.governmenthouse.gg

The lieutenant governor of Guernsey is the representative of the British monarch in the Bailiwick of Guernsey, a Crown dependency of the British Crown. The role of the lieutenant governor is to act as the de facto head of state in Guernsey and as liaison between the governments of Guernsey and the United Kingdom. The holder of this office is also ex officio a member of the States of Guernsey but may not vote and, by convention, speaks in the Chamber only on appointment and on departure from post. The duties are primarily diplomatic and ceremonial. He has the authority to appoint two members of the board of governors of Elizabeth College and the Priaulx Library.

The lieutenant governor has his own flag in Guernsey, the Union Flag defaced with the Bailiwick's coat of arms.

== History ==
The Crown appointed Wardens or Keepers to represent its interests in the Channel Islands. After 1473 separate Wardens were appointed for Guernsey and Jersey, the title of Captain or Governor also being used. Around the early 17th century the title of Governor was settled upon, although those appointed to the position of Governor adopted the practice of appointing a lieutenant to carry out their duties in their absence. By the 19th century the post of Governor of Guernsey had become a sinecure and the position was abolished in 1835. Since then Lieutenant Governors have continued to be appointed.

In 2010 it was announced that the next Lieutenant-Governor would be recommended to the Crown by a Guernsey panel consisting of the Bailiff of Guernsey, the Seigneur of Sark, and the President of the States of Alderney, sitting with a human resources professional. This new system replaced the previous system of the appointment being made by the Crown on the recommendation of UK ministers. The first person selected by this process was former RAF officer Air Marshal Peter Walker, who was sworn in on 15 April 2011.

A roll of honour of the Governors and Lieutenant Governors of Guernsey from 1198 to date has been installed at Government House.

== List of lieutenant governors of Guernsey ==
1689-1690: Colonel Sidney Godolphin
1704-1708: Sir Edmund Andros

List of lieutenant governors of Guernsey 1770 to date
Title	Appointed	Name
Serving under Governor of Guernsey:	1770	Lt-Col. Paulus Aemilius Irving
	1784	Lt-Col. William Brown
	1793	Maj-Gen. Thomas Dundas
	1793	Col. James Henry Craig
	1793	Maj-Gen. John Small
	1796	Lt-Gen. Sir Hew Dalrymple
	1803	Maj-Gen. Sir John Doyle
	1816	Maj-Gen. Henry Bayly
	1821	Maj-Gen. Sir John Colborne
	1828	Maj-Gen. John Ross
Lieutenant Governor and Colonel on Staff:	1837	Gen. Sir James Douglas
	1842	Maj-Gen. Sir William Francis Patrick Napier
	1848	Lt-Gen. Sir John Bell
	1854	Lt-Gen. William Thomas Knollys
	1856	Lt-Gen. Sir George Judd Harding
	1859	Maj-Gen. Marcus John Slade
	1864	Maj-Gen. Charles Rochfort Scott
	1869	Lt-Gen. Edward Charles Frome
	1874	Lt-Gen. Hon. St George Gerald Foley
	1879	Maj-Gen. Alexander Abercromby Nelson
	1883	Maj-Gen. Henry Andrew Sarel
	1885	Lt-Gen. John Henry Ford Elkington
	1889	Gen. Sir Edward Gascoyne Bulwer
Lieutenant Governor and Commanding the Troops:	1894	Lt-Gen. Nathaniel Stevenson
	1899	Maj-Gen. Michael Henry Saward
	1903	Maj-Gen. Barrington Bulkeley Douglas Campbell
	1908	Maj-Gen. Robert Auld
	1911	Maj-Gen. Sir Edward Owen Fisher Hamilton
	1914	Maj-Gen. Sir Henry Merrick Lawson
	1914	Gen. Sir Reginald Clare Hart
	1918	Lt-Gen. Sir Launcelot Edward Kiggell
	1920	Maj-Gen. Sir John Edward Capper
	1925	Maj-Gen. Sir Charles Sackville-West
	1929	Maj-Gen. Lord Ruthven of Freeland
	1934	Maj-Gen. Sir Edward Nicholson Broadbent
	1939	Maj-Gen. Alexander Telfer-Smollett
	1940	Maj-Gen. John Minshull-Ford (7 to 20 June 1940)
	1940–1945	German occupation of the Channel Islands – post vacated as part of demilitarisation of the island
Head of the British Military Government:	1945	Rear-Adm. Charles Gage Stuart
Lieutenant Governor and Commander-in-Chief:	1945	Lt-Gen. Sir Philip Neame
	1953	Air Marshal Sir Thomas Elmhirst
	1958	Vice-Adm. Sir Geoffrey Robson
	1964	Lt-Gen. Sir Charles Coleman
	1969	Vice-Adm. Sir Charles Mills
	1974	Vice-Adm. Sir John Edward Ludgate Martin
	1980	Air Chief Marshal Sir Peter de Lacey Le Cheminant
	1985	Lt-Gen. Sir Alexander Boswell
	1990	Lt-Gen. Sir Michael Compton Lockwood Wilkins
	1994	Vice-Adm. Sir John Francis Coward
	2000	Lt-Gen. Sir John Paul Foley
	2005	Vice-Adm. Sir Fabian Malbon
	2011–2015	Air Marshal Peter Walker
	2016	Vice-Adm. Sir Ian Corder
	2022	Lt-Gen. Richard Cripwell

== See also ==
- List of bailiffs of Guernsey
- List of governors of Guernsey
- List of bailiffs of Jersey
- List of lieutenant governors of Jersey

== Sources ==
- Cruickshanks, Eveline (1970). GODOLPHIN, Sidney (1652–1732), of Thames Ditton, Surr in The History of Parliament: the House of Commons 1715-1754 (Online ed.). Boydell & Brewer.
