= John Elkington (British Army officer) =

British Army general

Lieutenant-General John Elkington CB
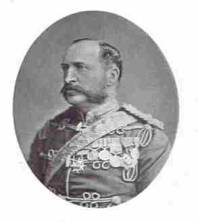
- Born: 10 April 1830; Dublin, Ireland
- Died: 21 February 1889 (aged 58); Guernsey, Bailiwick of Guernsey
- Military career
- Allegiance: United Kingdom
- Branch: British Army
- Service years: c. 1848–1889
- Rank: Lieutenant-General
- Conflicts: Crimean War; Indian Mutiny
- Awards: Companion of the Order of the Bath

Lieutenant-General John Henry Ford Elkington CB (10 April 1830 – 21 February 1889) was a British Army officer who became Lieutenant Governor of Guernsey.

== Military career ==
Elkington became a lieutenant with the 6th Regiment of Foot in 1849. He served with his Regiment during the 7th and 8th Xhosa Wars. He was appointed Assistant Quartermaster-General to the Ottoman Contingent during the Crimean War and then became Aide-de-Camp to Sir John Michel during the Indian Mutiny. He continued to serve as Aide-de-Camp to Michel during the Second Opium War. In 1880 he became Deputy Adjutant-General for the Auxiliary Forces at Army Headquarters.

He was appointed Lieutenant Governor of Guernsey in 1885 and died in office in 1889. He was also Honorary Colonel of the Fortress and Railway Forces.

His son, John Ford Elkington, was also an officer in the Royal Warwickshire regiment, rising to the rank of lieutenant colonel and command of a battalion. He was cashiered in 1914 during the First World War and afterwards served in the French Foreign Legion, winning medals for bravery. In 1916 he was reinstated in his rank in the British Army.

Government offices
Preceded by Henry Sarel	Lieutenant Governor of Guernsey; 1885–1889	Succeeded by Sir Edward Bulwer
