= St George Foley =

British Army general (1814-1897)

General The Honourable Sir St George Foley KCB FRGS
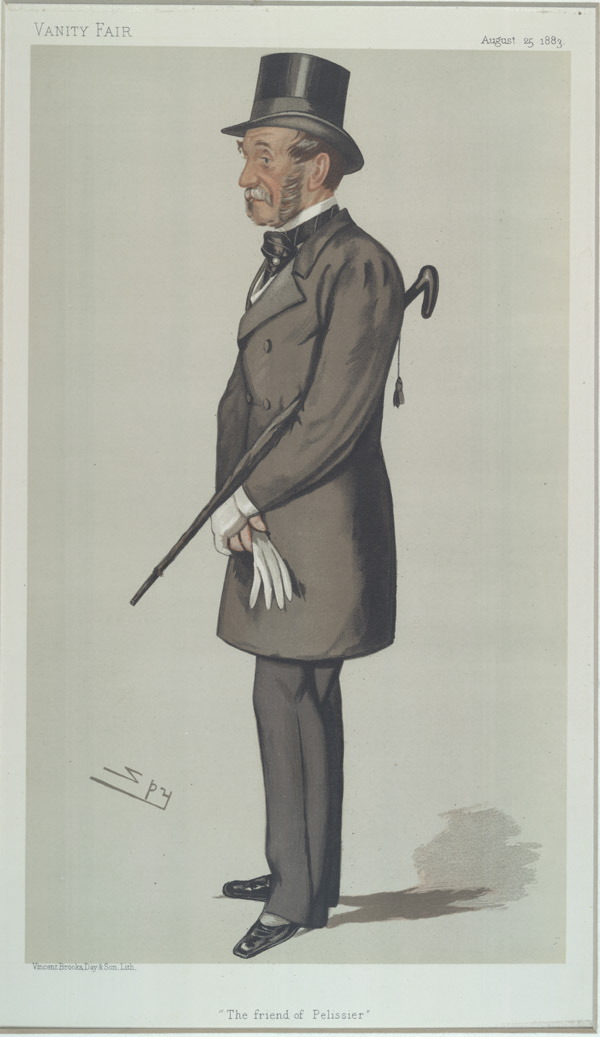
- Born: 10 July 1814
- Died: 24 January 1897 (aged 82)
- Military career
- Allegiance: United Kingdom
- Branch: British Army
- Service years: 1832–1879
- Rank: General
- Conflicts: Crimean War; Second Opium War
- Awards: Knight Commander of the Order of the Bath

General Sir St George Gerald Foley KCB FRGS (10 July 1814 – 24 January 1897) was a British Army officer who became Lieutenant Governor of Guernsey.

== Military career ==
Born the son of Thomas Foley, 3rd Baron Foley, Foley was commissioned into the 53rd Regiment of Foot in 1832. He was sent to Malta in 1834. After services as Aide-de-camp to the Commander-in-Chief, Ireland he became Assistant Commissioner at the Headquarters of the French Army in the East and was subsequently awarded the Order of the Medjidie for his service during the Crimean War in 1855. He later took part in the Second Opium War.

He was appointed Lieutenant Governor of Guernsey in 1874.

He was also Honorary Colonel of the South Staffordshire Regiment.

== Family ==
In 1865 he married Augusta Selina Sturt, daughter of Henry Sturt MP. Lady Foley died 21 February 1901. They had two sons.

Government offices
Preceded by Sir Edward Frome	Lieutenant Governor of Guernsey; 1874–1879	Succeeded by Sir Alexander Nelson
