= 2020 in Guernsey =

Events in the year 2020 in Guernsey.

== Incumbents ==
- Duke of Normandy: Elizabeth II
- Lieutenant governor: Ian Corder
- Chief minister: Gavin St Pier (until 16 October); Peter Ferbrache onwards
- Bailiff: Richard Collas (until May); Richard McMahon onwards

== Events ==
Ongoing: COVID-19 pandemic in Guernsey

- 12 February: The Alliance Party Guernsey is established.
- 9 March: The first COVID-19 case is reported.
- 25 March: A lockdown is ordered due to rising COVID-19 cases.
- 20 June: Following a lack of cases, the lockdown is lifted.
- 5 August: The Guernsey Party is established.
- 18 August: The Future Guernsey is established.
- 7 October: 2020 Guernsey general election
- 28 November: 2020 Alderney general election
- 12 December: 2020 Alderney plebiscite election
- 16 December: 2020 Sark general election
- The electoral districts of Saint Peter Port North and Saint Peter Port South are abolished.

== Deaths ==
- 30 May: Sir John Coward, 82, British vice admiral, Commandant Royal College of Defence Studies (1992–1994) and Lieutenant Governor of Guernsey (1994–2000).
