= President of the Policy and Resources Committee of Guernsey =

Head of government in Guernsey

- Logo of the Policy and Resources Committee

- Flag of Guernsey
- Incumbent; Lindsay de Sausmarez since 1 July 2025
- Policy & Resources Committee; States of Guernsey
- Member of: Policy and Resources Committee; British–Irish Council
- Appointer: States of Guernsey
- Term length: Five years
- Precursor: Chief Minister
- Formation: 1 May 2016
- First holder: Gavin St Pier
- Unofficial names: Chief Minister
- Salary: £67,686 annually

The President of the Policy and Resources Committee (P&RC president), also known as the Chief Minister of Guernsey, is the head of government of Guernsey and chair of the Policy and Resources Committee. The head of government is not directly elected by the people but rather by the legislature, the States of Guernsey.

The current P&RC president is Lindsay de Sausmarez.

== History ==
Following a reform of the institutions of Guernsey adopted in July 2015, a five-member senior committee, Policy and Resources Committee, headed by a president was created on 1 May 2016 to replace the Policy Council. The position of Chief Minister, who chaired the Policy Council, was abolished, along with the ministerial government system.

== Selection ==
The 40 members of the States of Guernsey hold a secret ballot election to determine the president, with successive rounds of voting continuing until an outright winner is elected. All candidates must be proposed and seconded. The president of the committee is the de facto head of government of Guernsey and may be given the title "Chief Minister".

The President can be removed through a motion of "no confidence" by the members of the States of Guernsey. In the event that the vote is lost, it results in the immediate resignation of the President and Members of the Policy & Resources Committee, the States of Deliberation having no confidence in the said Committee and will result in an immediate election of first a new President and then the new committee members.

== List of titleholders ==
#	Image	Name	Took office	Left office	Political party	Election	Vice President	Ref.
1		Gavin St Pier (born 1967)	4 May 2016	16 October 2020	Independent (until 18 August 2020)	2016	(vacant)	
1		Gavin St Pier (born 1967)	4 May 2016	16 October 2020	Guernsey Partnership of Independents (from 18 August 2020)	2016	(vacant)	
2		Peter Ferbrache (born 1951)	16 October 2020	13 December 2023	Independent	2020	Heidi Soulsby (until 29 November 2022)	
2		Peter Ferbrache (born 1951)	16 October 2020	13 December 2023	Independent	2020	Mark Helyer	
3		Lyndon Trott (born 1964)	13 December 2023	1 July 2025	Future Guernsey	Vote of no confidence	Heidi Soulsby	
4		Lindsay de Sausmarez	1 July 2025	incumbent		2025	Gavin St Pier	

== Vice President of the Policy and Resources Committee of Guernsey ==
The Vice-President of the Policy and Resources Committee of Guernsey is the deputy leader within the island’s main governing body, supporting the President in setting overall policy direction and coordinating the work of government committees. The role involves helping to oversee strategic planning, representing Guernsey in official matters, and stepping in when the President is unavailable. Although Guernsey does not formally use the title, the position is often compared to a deputy head of government. The Policy and Resources Committee itself was established in 2016 as part of reforms introduced by the States of Guernsey, replacing the former Policy Council to create a more streamlined and centralized system of governance.

=== List of Vice Presidents ===
- Office Vacant (2016-2020)
- Heidi Soulsby (2020-2022) (1st term)
- Mark Helyer (2022-2023)
- Heidi Soulsby (2023-2025) (2nd term)
- Gavin St Pier (2025-2026)
- Yvonne Burford (2026–present)
