= Carl Meerveld =

Former Guernsey politician and Deputy 2016-2025

Carl P. Meerveld
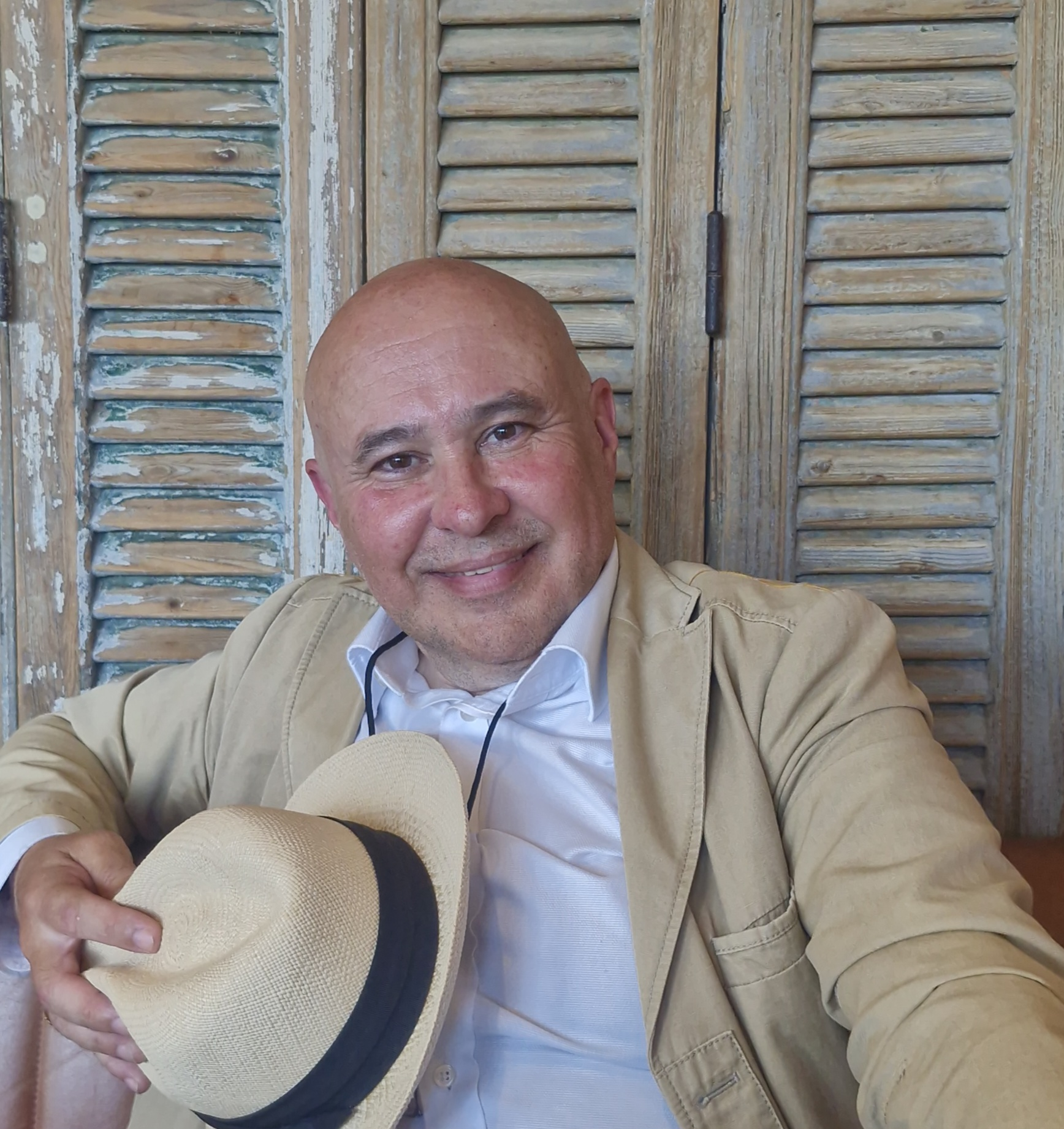
- Meerveld in June 2025

Deputy of the States of Guernsey
- In office 2016 – June 2025
- Constituency: Guernsey (island-wide)

Personal details
- Born: Guernsey
- Occupation: Politician
- Committees: States Assembly & Constitution Committee (President, 2020-2025)

Carl P. Meerveld is a former politician from Guernsey who served as a deputy in the States of Guernsey from 2016 to 2025. He served as president of the States Assembly & Constitution Committee between 2020 and 2025.

== Early life and career ==
Meerveld was born and raised in Saint Sampson, Guernsey.

Before entering politics, Meerveld worked internationally for 30 years, establishing and managing companies in Asia and the United States. He set up companies in Asian markets and managed Asia operations for three investment fund research companies.

After working abroad and starting a family, he returned to Saint Sampson with his wife and two sons. He moved back to Guernsey seven years before his first election in 2016.

== Political career ==
=== Elections ===
Meerveld was first elected to the States of Guernsey in the 2016 Guernsey general election. He was re-elected in the 2020 Guernsey general election and stood for re-election in the 2025 Guernsey general election. He was unsuccessful in securing re-election in 2025, ending his nine-year tenure in the States.

=== Committee roles ===
Meerveld served as president of the States Assembly & Constitution Committee from 2020 to 2025. In this role, he oversaw the introduction of Simultaneous Electronic Voting, which records all members' votes. He also worked on establishing an independent Commissioner for Standards to evaluate complaints against serving Deputies.

Earlier in his political career, Meerveld served as vice-president of the Education, Sport and Culture Committee until December 2017, when he resigned following controversy over a £10,000 public relations campaign. He also served as Chair of the Administrative Decision Review Board.

=== Renewable energy advocacy ===
Meerveld was involved in offshore wind energy development proposals for Guernsey's waters. In October 2022, he authored the Offshore Wind Scoping Report as part of a group of 15 deputies researching renewable energy opportunities. The report identified potential wind farm sites covering 610 km².

He chaired the Policy & Resources Committee's offshore wind sub-committee until September 2023, when he was replaced following disagreements over his public statements about potential revenue from offshore wind projects.

=== Position on goods and services tax ===
Meerveld opposed proposals to introduce a goods and services tax (GST) in Guernsey. He was involved in the "Red Ribbon Campaign" that organized protests against GST proposals in 2023. The campaign included a march in January 2023 that drew significant public participation. Following public debate and opposition campaigns, GST proposals were rejected by the States Assembly twice in 2023.

=== Other political positions ===
Meerveld expressed support for various transparency and accountability measures, including reinstatement of the Public Accounts Committee, introduction of a Freedom of Information Law, and establishment of an independent Ombudsman.

== Media attention ==
In April 2020, Meerveld delivered a speech in the States chamber where he rapidly listed fruits and vegetables he was growing in his garden during a debate on the Island Development Plan. The speech received local media coverage.

== Personal life ==
Meerveld lives in St. Sampson with his family and has two sons. He grows fruits and vegetables on his property.
