= Andrea Dudley-Owen =

Former Guernsey politician

President of the Committee for Education, Sport and Culture
- In office 19 October 2020 – June 2025
- Preceded by: Matt Fallaize

Vice-President of the Committee for Economic Development
- In office 2016–2020

Member of the States of Guernsey
- In office 2016 – June 2025

Personal details
- Spouse: Colin Dudley-Owen
- Children: 3
- Education: Degree in Japanese; TEFLA qualification
- Occupation: Politician, businesswoman

Andrea Dudley-Owen is a former Guernsey politician who served as President of the Committee for Education, Sport and Culture from October 2020 to June 2025. She was a member of the States of Guernsey from 2016 to 2025 and stood as an independent candidate in the 2025 Guernsey general election, where she was unsuccessful in securing re-election.

== Early life and career ==
Andrea has a degree in Japanese and worked in England and Asia before returning to Guernsey to work in the financial services sector.

She established business interests in Guernsey and became involved in the trust industry before entering politics.

== Political career ==
Dudley-Owen was elected to the States of Guernsey representing the Western District in the 2016 general election. During her first term, she served as vice-president of the Committee for Economic Development.

In the 2020 Guernsey general election, Dudley-Owen was re-elected island-wide, coming third overall with 12,589 votes. She was elected as President of the Committee for Education, Sport and Culture on 19 October 2020.

She stood for re-election in the 2025 Guernsey general election but was unsuccessful, ending her nine-year tenure in the States of Guernsey.

=== Educational transformation debates ===
Dudley-Owen's tenure as Education President was marked by significant debates over secondary education reform. Initially, she opposed the "two-school model" proposed by her predecessor, arguing that large schools would create "impersonal education factories" where vulnerable pupils would be lost and potentially bullied.

In January 2020, she led a requête calling for a one-year delay on school transformation plans, arguing that the new States Assembly elected in 2020 should make the final decision.

After becoming Education President, Dudley-Owen led a "pause and review" of secondary education in March 2020, which the States voted to support. She expressed confidence that a new education model would be ready within 12 months of her appointment.

Her committee later proposed a model featuring three 11-16 schools at St Sampson's, Les Varendes and Les Beaucamps, with a co-located sixth form and Guernsey Institute at Les Ozouets.

=== COVID-19 response ===
During the COVID-19 pandemic, Dudley-Owen oversaw the education sector's response to disrupted examinations. In January 2021, she issued statements regarding the cancellation of formal examinations and the adoption of teacher assessments.

=== Les Ozouets Campus funding ===
In 2023, Dudley-Owen advocated for funding the construction of the Les Ozouets campus, arguing that failure to invest would constitute "a false economy." She warned that inadequate investment would damage Guernsey's educational reputation and risk losing qualified staff and course accreditations.

== Personal life ==
Dudley-Owen is married to Colin and has three children.

In 2021, Dudley-Owen was diagnosed with breast cancer. She publicly shared her experience to raise awareness about the importance of regular breast examinations and praised Guernsey's health service for the care she received. "I want to help raise awareness to make sure that people are checking their breasts and chest area regularly," she wrote, noting that "one in seven of us will get the disease" according to Cancer Research UK statistics.

== Political positions ==
Dudley-Owen advocated for education reform, arguing against large comprehensive schools in favor of smaller institutions. "This once-in-a-generation chance to get it right will actually affect more than a generation if we get it wrong because we won't have the skills, we won't have the aptitude, we won't have the confidence of young people being able to take the legacy of Guernsey on," she stated regarding education policy.

On education funding, she argued that "not investing now leads to much greater spend in the not-too-distant future and is a false economy today, leaving more debt and expense for taxpayers tomorrow."
