= Council of the Isles =

Council of the Isles may be a reference to:

- the council of Highland chiefs and freeholders charged with the provision of advice to the medieval Lord of the Isles
- the British–Irish Council, established in 1999
