= Paul Montague =

British teacher and politician

Member of the States of Guernsey
- Incumbent
- Assumed office 1 July 2025

Personal details
- Party: Independent
- Occupation: Teacher, politician

Paul Montague is a British teacher and politician from Guernsey. He was elected as a member of the States of Guernsey on 18 June 2025, and assumed office on 1 July. Prior to his election, Montague was a schoolteacher and representative for the National Education Union.

== Early life and career ==
Montague worked as a public school teacher for thirty years and was the National Education Union's representative in Guernsey.

He helped introduce a new International Baccalaureate career-related programme at the Les Varendes High School and The Sixth Form Centre in order to prepare students for a career in finance and was the school's long-time IB coordinator.

== States of Guernsey ==
=== Election ===
On 18 June 2025, Montague was elected as a member of the States of Guernsey. He received 8,884 votes (2.06% of the total), making him the highest-polling newcomer in the election. During the campaign season, he visited a local pub and was interviewed at length by the Guernsey Press. Montague credited his success to the support of his students, who helped film and create TikTok videos for the campaign.

=== Tenure ===
On 4 July 2025, Montague was elected President of the Committee for Education, Sport & Culture with thirty-four votes in favour and four abstaining after being nominated by Lindsay de Sausmarez and Gavin St Pier. He proposed introducing a board of governors to administer schools in Guernsey.
