= 2020 Alderney plebiscite election =

The 2020 Alderney plebiscite election was held on 12 December 2020 to elect 2 members to be nominated to represent Alderney in the States of Guernsey.

== Results ==
Candidate	Votes	%
Alexander Snowdon	469	46.48
Steve Roberts	344	34.09
Kevin Gentle	196	19.43
Total	1,009	100.00
Valid votes	537	99.81
Invalid/blank votes	1	0.19
Total votes	538	100.00
Registered voters/turnout		37%
