= 2020 Sark general election =

General elections were due to be held in Sark on 16 December 2020 and will serve for 4 years, until December 2024.

== Electoral system ==
The 28 members of the Chief Pleas are elected via plurality block voting for four-year terms in two tranches. The 2020 election was held to replace nine members who had been elected with the four-year term beginning in 2016.

== Results ==
Only six candidates vied and were elected unopposed for the nine available seats, meaning a further election needed to be held to elect the three seats that remained vacant. Until the second election was held on 3 March 2021, three members were appointed interim Conseillers. However, at the second election, only two candidates stood and were elected unopposed to fill the three vacancies, meaning there was one remaining.

- Edric Baker
- Tony Eric Le Lievre
- Frank William Makepeace
- Fern Joanne Turner
- Paul Joseph Williams
- Sandra Williams
- Pippa Rose Donovan
- Joseph Michael Donovan
