= Alliance Party Guernsey =

Guernsey political party

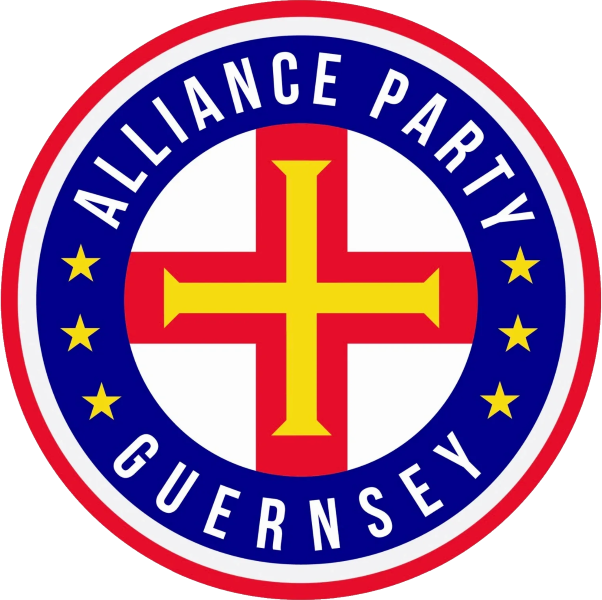
- Abbreviation: APG
- Leader: Barry Weir
- Founded: January 2020
- Registered: 12 February 2020
- Ideology: Liberalism
- Political position: Centre
- Colours: Red; Blue
- Slogan: A Better Guernsey For All
- States of Guernsey: 0 / 40

Website
- apg.gg

The Alliance Party Guernsey is a political party in Guernsey, and was the first political party to organise in Guernsey.

== History ==
On 12 February 2020, the Alliance Party Guernsey was registered by the Greffe becoming the first political party to organise in Guernsey. The party ran eleven candidates in the 2020 Guernsey general election. None were elected.

== Election results ==
=== States of Guernsey ===
Election	Leader	Votes	%	Seats	+/–	Government
2020	Barry Weir	21,449	3.36 (#3)	0 / 40	New	Extra-parliamentary
