= Guernsey Party =

- Leader: John Dyke
- Founder: Mark Helyar
- Founded: 5 August 2020
- Ideology: Conservatism; Economic liberalism
- Political position: Centre-right
- Colors: Green
- States of Guernsey: 0 / 40

Website
- www.theguernseyparty.gg

The Guernsey Party is a centre-right political party in Guernsey founded in 2020 by Mark Heylar.

The party ran eight candidates in the 2020 Guernsey general election. Six were elected.
