= 2020 Guernsey general election =

General election

| ← 2016 | 7 October 2020 | 2025 → |

38 of the 40 seats in the States of Guernsey
- Registered: 30,899
- Turnout: 79.70% (▲7.79 pp)

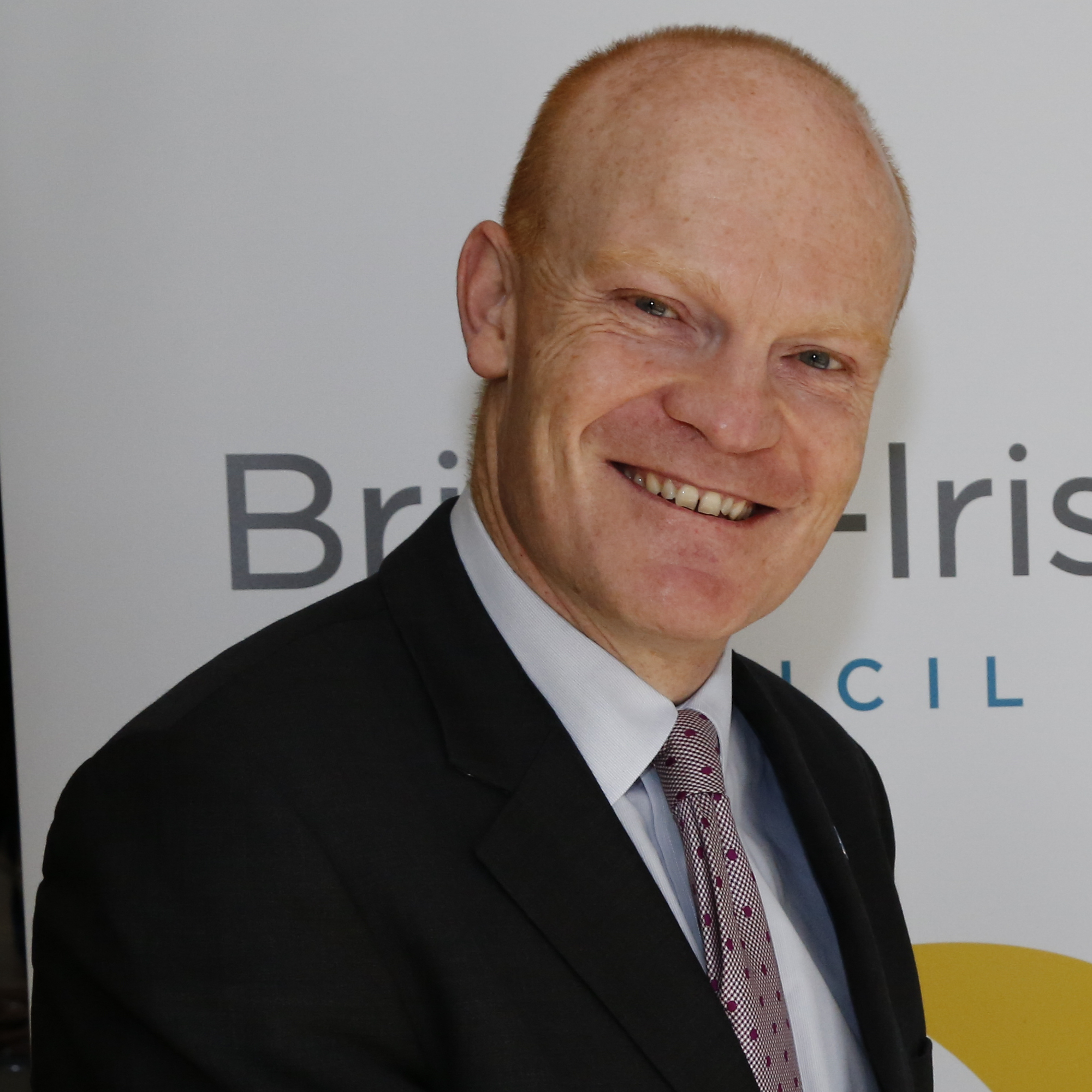

| | First party | Second party | Third party |
|---|---|---|---|
| Leader | N/A | Gavin St Pier | Mark Helyar |
| Party | Independents | GPI | Guernsey Party |
| Seats won | 22 | 10 | 6 |
| Seat change | ▼16 | New | New |
| Popular vote | 399,155 | 153,119 | 63,844 |
| Percentage | 62.6% | 24.0% | 10.0% |
| Swing | ▼37.4pp | New | New |
President of the Policy and Resources Committee before election
Gavin St Pier
Guernsey Partnership of Independents
President of the Policy and Resources Committee after election
Peter Ferbrache
Independent

The 2020 Guernsey general election took place on 7 October 2020 to elect 38 members of the States of Guernsey. Originally scheduled to be held in June 2020, it was delayed by a year to 2021, due to the COVID-19 pandemic, before being brought forward to its final date.

This election was the first on the island to include political parties, as the first ones were organised and registered in 2020. The parties were partly created to help candidates cope with the 2020 change to an Island-wide voting system, it being considered difficult and expensive for one candidate to reach out to the 30,000 electors, with those holding similar views being able to produce a joint manifesto for a party. It was equally difficult for electors to read 119 individual candidates' manifestos. A candidate needed around 7,000 votes to get elected in 2020, compared to as few as 700 under the previous district system.

On 16 October 2020, Peter Ferbrache was elected president of the Policy and Resources Committee by a vote of 23–17, ahead of incumbent Gavin St Pier.

== Timetable ==
- 21 August: Last day the public was able to register to vote / Electoral roll closed
- 1 September: Candidate nomination period opened
- 4 September: Deadline (4 pm) for the delivery of candidate nomination papers
- 25 September: Deadline (midnight) to apply for a postal vote
- 3–6 October: Advance "super" polling stations are open.
- 6 October: Advance parish polling stations are open.
- 7 October: Polling day. Polling stations open at 8 am and close at 8 pm. 6 am deadline for posting postal ballots.
- 8 October: Counting of votes
- 10–11 October: Recount

== Electoral system ==
The electoral system was changed as a result of a 2018 referendum. The 38 members of the States were now elected from a single island-wide constituency by plurality-at-large voting, with voters being able to cast up to 38 votes.

Prior to the elections, the age for candidates to stand was reduced from 20 to 18. The voting age is 16. Campaign spending per candidate was also reduced from £9,000 to £6,000.

For the first time, a Guernsey election was scrutinised by a team of international observers who were to produce two reports on the process.

== Candidates ==
A total of 119 candidates filed nominations. There were 28 female candidates (24%), which was an increase over the previous two elections, with 10 of 12 current female deputies standing for re-election. Twenty-nine candidates in total stood for re-election. The election was the first including political parties, as the first parties were organised in 2020.

Rick Lowe, a candidate for the Guernsey Party, withdrew from the election following a medical diagnosis.

All but six candidates provided a manifesto for printing in a book which was then sent to every address that had a registered voter. The book and the mandates from the other six candidates were published on the election2020 website. A small number of candidates paid the cost of sending their expanded manifestos to registered voters.

| Party | Leader | Seats at dissolution | Candidates |
|---|---|---|---|
| Independent | N/A | 38 | 78 |
| Guernsey Party | Mark Helyar | 0 | 8 |
| Guernsey Partnership of Independents | Gavin St Pier | 0 | 21 |
| Alliance Party Guernsey | Barry Weir | 0 | 11 |

=== Hustings ===
An all-day public hustings event at Beau Sejour on Sunday 20 September with 116 candidates showed disappointing numbers of the public attending. Those that did were mainly elderly people, with islanders thinking that having over 100 candidates made it too difficult and time-consuming to research which candidates have acceptable views on matters of personal interest.

=== Postal votes ===
Over 21,000 postal votes were requested, representing over 67% of registered voters.

== Results ==
The results were reported at 01:15 local time on Friday, 9 October. The new deputies were due to be sworn in on 16 October.

Four unsuccessful candidates who had polled within 493 votes (2% of voters) of the final elected candidate's votes requested a recount. The recount did not change the elected candidates but adjusted the number of voters from 24,647 to 24,627 with votes for a number of candidates increasing or decreasing by single digit amounts. The largest change for one candidate was 11 votes, while the number of rejected ballots increased by 67, two pairs of unelected candidates switched final positions and two candidates of the same surname were mixed up in the first count, receiving each other's count, which was fixed.

The elected deputies were to serve until the next general election in June 2025.

=== Summary results ===
A total of 18 deputies were re-elected, while 20 were newcomers. The number of female deputies fell from 12 to 8, with four re-elected and four new deputies, giving 21% female representation in the States.

Summary results of the 2020 Guernsey general election
| Party | Votes | % | Seats | +/– |
|---|---|---|---|---|
| Guernsey Partnership of Independents | 153,119 | 24.02 | 10 | New |
| Guernsey Party | 63,844 | 10.01 | 6 | New |
| Alliance Party Guernsey | 21,449 | 3.36 | 0 | New |
| Independent | 399,155 | 62.61 | 22 | –16 |
| Seats reserved for Alderney | | | 2 | 0 |
| Total | 637,567 | 100.00 | 40 | 0 |
| Valid votes | 24,473 | 99.37 | | |
| Invalid/blank votes | 154 | 0.63 | | |
| Total votes | 24,627 | 100.00 | | |
| Registered voters/turnout | 30,899 | 79.70 | | |
Source: Guernsey Election Office

=== Full results ===
Results of the 2020 Guernsey general election
| Party | Candidate | Votes | % |
|---|---|---|---|
| Guernsey Partnership of Independents | Gavin St Pier (incumbent) | 13,927 | 56.55% |
| Guernsey Partnership of Independents | Heidi Soulsby (incumbent) | 12,779 | 51.89% |
| Independent | Andrea Dudley-Owen (incumbent) | 12,583 | 51.09% |
| Guernsey Party | Mark Helyar | 11,398 | 46.28% |
| Independent | Peter Ferbrache (incumbent) | 11,142 | 45.24% |
| Independent | John Gollop (incumbent) | 11,033 | 44.80% |
| Independent | Peter Roffey (incumbent) | 10,254 | 41.64% |
| Independent | Neil Inder (incumbent) | 10,250 | 41.62% |
| Guernsey Partnership of Independents | Lyndon Trott (incumbent) | 9,903 | 40.21% |
| Independent | Susan Aldwell | 9,881 | 40.12% |
| Independent | Liam McKenna | 9,308 | 37.80% |
| Guernsey Partnership of Independents | Yvonne Burford | 9,285 | 37.70% |
| Guernsey Partnership of Independents | Al Brouard (incumbent) | 9,273 | 37.65% |
| Guernsey Partnership of Independents | Steve Falla | 9,242 | 37.53% |
| Guernsey Party | Simon Vermeulen | 9,081 | 36.87% |
| Guernsey Partnership of Independents | Sasha Kazantseva-Miller | 9,016 | 36.61% |
| Independent | Sam Haskins | 8,896 | 36.12% |
| Independent | Charles Parkinson (incumbent) | 8,812 | 35.78% |
| Independent | Rob Prow (incumbent) | 8,699 | 35.32% |
| Independent | Chris Blin | 8,694 | 35.30% |
| Guernsey Partnership of Independents | Lindsay De Sausmarez (incumbent) | 8,645 | 35.10% |
| Guernsey Partnership of Independents | Jonathan Le Tocq (incumbent) | 8,636 | 35.07% |
| Independent | Adrian Gabriel | 8,404 | 34.13% |
| Independent | Victoria Oliver (incumbent) | 8,367 | 33.97% |
| Independent | Aidan Matthews | 8,258 | 33.53% |
| Guernsey Party | John Dyke | 8,214 | 33.35% |
| Independent | Andrew Taylor | 7,770 | 31.55% |
| Independent | Andy Cameron | 7,694 | 31.24% |
| Independent | David Mahoney | 7,521 | 30.54% |
| Guernsey Party | Nick Moakes | 7,420 | 30.13% |
| Guernsey Partnership of Independents | Tina Bury | 7,394 | 30.02% |
| Independent | Simon Fairclough | 7,394 | 30.02% |
| Independent | David De Lisle (incumbent) | 7,138 | 28.98% |
| Independent | Marc Leadbeater (incumbent) | 7,111 | 28.87% |
| Independent | Lester Queripel (incumbent) | 6,950 | 28.22% |
| Guernsey Party | Bob Murray | 6,715 | 27.27% |
| Guernsey Party | Chris Le Tissier | 6,615 | 26.86% |
| Independent | Carl Meerveld (incumbent) | 6,477 | 26.30% |
| Independent | Fergus Dunlop | 6,351 | 25.79% |
| Independent | Pierre Ehmann | 6,336 | 25.73% |
| Independent | Catherine Hall | 6,277 | 25.49% |
| Guernsey Partnership of Independents | Scott Ogier | 6,089 | 24.72% |
| Independent | Garry Collins | 6,076 | 24.67% |
| Independent | Adam Martel | 5,984 | 24.30% |
| Independent | Siân Jones | 5,875 | 23.86% |
| Independent | Jennifer Merrett (incumbent) | 5,834 | 23.69% |
| Guernsey Partnership of Independents | Sarah Hansmann Rouxel (incumbent) | 5,714 | 23.20% |
| Guernsey Party | Clive McMinn | 5,701 | 23.15% |
| Guernsey Partnership of Independents | Josh Macksoni | 5,678 | 23.06% |
| Guernsey Partnership of Independents | André Quevâtre | 5,577 | 22.65% |
| Independent | Richard Skipper | 5,529 | 22.45% |
| Independent | Robert Gregson | 5,415 | 21.99% |
| Guernsey Party | Tory Russell | 5,296 | 21.50% |
| Independent | Michael Beaumont | 5,291 | 21.48% |
| Guernsey Partnership of Independents | Mark Dorey (incumbent) | 5,196 | 21.10% |
| Independent | Mark Fletcher | 5,104 | 20.73% |
| Guernsey Partnership of Independents | Nigel Chescoe | 5,065 | 20.57% |
| Independent | Mary Lowe (incumbent) | 5,031 | 20.43% |
| Guernsey Partnership of Independents | David Inglis | 4,920 | 19.98% |
| Guernsey Partnership of Independents | Sandra Mbe James | 4,798 | 19.48% |
| Guernsey Partnership of Independents | Jane Stephens (incumbent) | 4,734 | 19.22% |
| Independent | Lucia Faith | 4,602 | 18.69% |
| Independent | Adrian Dilcock | 4,549 | 18.47% |
| Independent | Ross Le Brun | 4,532 | 18.40% |
| Independent | Barry Brehaut (incumbent) | 4,527 | 18.38% |
| Independent | Guilhem Chene | 4,508 | 18.31% |
| Independent | Craig Bougourd | 4,376 | 17.77% |
| Independent | Jon Wilson | 4,282 | 17.39% |
| Independent | Paul Neuvel | 4,144 | 16.83% |
| Independent | Ian Le Page | 4,048 | 16.44% |
| Independent | John Robilliard | 4,033 | 16.38% |
| Independent | Yves Lenormand | 3,918 | 15.91% |
| Independent | Jeremy Smithies (incumbent) | 3,879 | 15.39% |
| Independent | Jonathan Crossan | 3,804 | 15.45% |
| Independent | Nicola Young | 3,797 | 15.42% |
| Independent | Martyn Roussel | 3,786 | 15.37% |
| Independent | Ivan Rihoy | 3,746 | 15.21% |
| Independent | Neil Shepherd | 3,739 | 15.18% |
| Guernsey Partnership of Independents | Rhian Tooley (incumbent) | 3,669 | 14.90% |
| Independent | Sarah Breton | 3,645 | 14.80% |
| Guernsey Partnership of Independents | Shane Langlois (incumbent) | 3,579 | 14.53% |
| Independent | Neil Cave | 3,495 | 14.19% |
| Independent | Diane Mitchell | 3,477 | 14.12% |
| Independent | Neil Forman | 3,453 | 14.02% |
| Independent | Matt Fallaize (incumbent) | 3,446 | 13.99% |
| Guernsey Party | Rick Lowe† | 3,404 | 13.82% |
| Independent | Elis Bebb | 3,387 | 13.75% |
| Alliance Party Guernsey | Tony Cunningham | 3,385 | 13.75% |
| Independent | Darren Duquemin | 3,215 | 13.05% |
| Independent | Ray McLean | 3,164 | 12.85% |
| Independent | Jenny Tasker | 3,162 | 12.84% |
| Independent | Melanie Harvey-Alan | 3,073 | 12.48% |
| Independent | Tony Walkington | 2,839 | 11.53% |
| Independent | Dawn Tindall (incumbent) | 2,788 | 11.32% |
| Alliance Party Guernsey | Elaine Mahy | 2,760 | 11.21% |
| Independent | Rosie Henderson | 2,665 | 10.82% |
| Independent | Christopher Nicolle | 2,661 | 10.81% |
| Independent | Syd Bowsher | 2,592 | 10.53% |
| Independent | Simon De La Mare | 2,488 | 10.10% |
| Independent | Robin Gibson | 2,355 | 9.56% |
| Alliance Party Guernsey | Kevin Hainsworth | 2,239 | 9.09% |
| Independent | Mark Brehaut | 2,222 | 9.02% |
| Independent | Rob Harnish | 2,024 | 8.22% |
| Independent | Ann Robilliard | 1,933 | 7.85% |
| Independent | Art Allen | 1,907 | 7.74% |
| Alliance Party Guernsey | Geoffrey Mahy | 1,895 | 7.69% |
| Alliance Party Guernsey | Barry Weir | 1,883 | 7.65% |
| Alliance Party Guernsey | Jane Le Ber | 1,858 | 7.54% |
| Independent | Clint Gardner | 1,839 | 7.47% |
| Independent | Steven Wall | 1,774 | 7.20% |
| Alliance Party Guernsey | Luke Tough | 1,716 | 6.97% |
| Alliance Party Guernsey | Phil Le Ber | 1,500 | 6.09% |
| Alliance Party Guernsey | Arron Hawke | 1,418 | 5.76% |
| Alliance Party Guernsey | Ken Smith | 1,398 | 5.68% |
| Alliance Party Guernsey | Daniel T. Mihalache | 1,397 | 5.67% |
| Independent | Phil Smith | 1,270 | 5.16% |
| Independent | Barry Harris | 945 | 3.84% |
| Independent | Gordon Young | 772 | 3.13% |
| Independent | John Titmuss | 555 | 2.25% |
| Total valid votes | | 637,567 | |
| Rejected ballots | | 154 | |
| Turnout | | 24,627 | 79.70% |
| Registered electors | | 30,899 | |

† Withdrew for medical reasons
