= Future Guernsey =

Political movement in Guernsey

- Founded: December 1, 2021 (first iteration); November 28, 2024 (relaunched)
- Type: Political movement
- Legal status: Active (unregistered)
- Purpose: Policy development and political advocacy
- Headquarters: Guernsey
- Political Adviser: Gavin St Pier (2024–2025)
- Chairman: John Hardie (2024–present)
- Chief Executive: Lindsey Freeman (2024–present)
- Website: www.futureguernsey.gg

Future Guernsey is a political movement in Guernsey focused on policy development and political advocacy. Originally founded in 2021 as a political party by Gavin St Pier, it was later de-registered and relaunched in November 2024 as an unregistered policy movement. Future Guernsey is deliberately structured to avoid registration as a political party, which prevents it from legally endorsing candidates but allows it to focus on policy development without electoral law constraints.

The organization developed a comprehensive political manifesto that was subsequently adopted "in its entirety" by the separate Forward Guernsey political party for the 2025 Guernsey general election.

== History ==
=== First iteration (2021) ===
Future Guernsey was first launched in December 2021 by Gavin St Pier as a successor to the dissolved Guernsey Partnership of Independents. St Pier described this initial version as "fiscally and environmentally responsible and socially liberal". This first iteration was registered as a political party but was later de-registered.

=== Relaunch as policy movement (2024) ===
Future Guernsey was relaunched on 28 November 2024 at the Performing Arts Centre in St Peter Port, with more than 250 people attending the launch event. The relaunched organization was deliberately structured as an unregistered movement rather than a political party.

The 2024 version established a different leadership structure, with St Pier serving as Political Adviser, former ITN chief executive John Hardie as Chairman, and communications consultant Lindsey Freeman as Chief Executive.

== Purpose and structure ==
=== Policy development focus ===
Future Guernsey's primary purpose is policy development and political advocacy without the legal constraints faced by registered political parties. The organization conducted research showing that only 13% of islanders believed Guernsey's political system was working effectively.

The movement developed what St Pier described as "the most detailed policy programme ever presented to voters locally".

=== Legal limitations ===
As an unregistered political movement, Future Guernsey cannot legally endorse or support candidates in elections under Guernsey electoral law. This limitation was acknowledged from the organization's relaunch, with St Pier stating that any electoral activity would require a separate registered political party.

== Policy platform ==
Future Guernsey's manifesto focuses on six core policy areas:

=== Housing ===
The movement proposes innovative housing policies including a tax-efficient Guernsey Property Savings Account (GPSA) modeled on the UK's Lifetime Individual Savings Account, allowing up to £60,000 to be saved tax-free for rental deposits or home purchases.

=== Economic growth ===
Future Guernsey emphasizes the need to increase economic productivity and encourage business investment as central to addressing other policy challenges.

=== Public finances ===
The organization proposes a 1% real terms reduction in committee baseline operating expenditure annually, which would cumulatively produce savings of at least £25 million.

=== Health, education, and climate change ===
The manifesto addresses healthcare provision for an aging population, educational funding and infrastructure, and environmental responsibility measures including climate transition policies.

== Relationship with Forward Guernsey ==
=== Electoral vehicle creation ===
Due to Future Guernsey's inability to endorse candidates, Gavin St Pier launched Forward Guernsey as a separate registered political party in April 2025. Forward Guernsey adopted Future Guernsey's manifesto "in its entirety", creating what St Pier described as a unique structure in Guernsey politics.

=== Organizational separation ===
Upon launching Forward Guernsey, St Pier resigned his role as Political Adviser to Future Guernsey to maintain the legal separation between the organizations. This structure allows Future Guernsey to continue policy development work while Forward Guernsey handles electoral activities.

== Philosophy and approach ==
Future Guernsey promotes what it calls "policy over personality" politics, arguing that Guernsey's system of independent deputies creates "endemic inertia and indecision". The organization advocates for policy-based governance structures as an alternative to personality-driven politics.

St Pier has described the current States Assembly as comprising "38 individual deputies with 38 individual agendas", resulting in a body that "may comprise individuals who all mean well but are collectively and systemically dysfunctional".

== See also ==
- Forward Guernsey
- Gavin St Pier
- Guernsey Partnership of Independents
- Politics of Guernsey
- 2025 Guernsey general election
