= 2025 Guernsey general election =

- 18 June 2025

38 of the 40 seats in the States of Guernsey 21 seats needed for a majority
President of the Policy and Resources Committee before election
Lyndon Trott
Independent
President of the Policy and Resources Committee
Lindsay de Sausmarez
Independent

General elections were held in Guernsey on 18 June 2025.

== Electoral system ==
People registered on the electoral roll voted for up to 38 candidates. All 38 deputies of the States of Guernsey were elected in an island-wide constituency.

== Results ==
| Party | Votes | % | Seats | +/– |
|---|---|---|---|---|
| Forward Guernsey | 31,731 | 7.34 | 3 | New |
| Independents | 400,481 | 92.66 | 35 | +3 |
| Seats reserved for Alderney | | | 2 | 0 |
| Total | 432,212 | 100.00 | 40 | 0 |
| Total votes | 19,686 | – | | |
| Registered voters/turnout | 27,293 | 72.13 | | |
Source: Guernsey Election Office

=== Full results ===
The full list of candidates is displayed below. Incumbent candidates are denoted with an asterisk.

| Candidate | Party | Votes | % |
|---|---|---|---|
| Lindsay de Sausmarez* | Independent | 10,721 | 2.48 |
| Yvonne Burford* | Independent | 9,427 | 2.18 |
| Charles Parkinson* | Independent | 9,294 | 2.15 |
| Steve Falla* | Independent | 9,017 | 2.09 |
| Paul Montague | Independent | 8,884 | 2.06 |
| Sasha Kazantseva-Miller* | Independent | 8,794 | 2.03 |
| Gavin St Pier* | Forward Guernsey | 8,577 | 1.98 |
| Tina Bury* | Independent | 8,496 | 1.97 |
| Jonathan Le Tocq* | Independent | 8,002 | 1.85 |
| Chris Blin* | Independent | 7,664 | 1.77 |
| George Oswald | Independent | 7,613 | 1.76 |
| Marc Laine | Independent | 7,556 | 1.75 |
| Aidan Matthews* | Independent | 7,312 | 1.69 |
| Marc Leadbeater* | Independent | 7,292 | 1.69 |
| Andy Cameron* | Independent | 7,177 | 1.66 |
| Sally Rochester | Independent | 7,119 | 1.65 |
| Adrian Gabriel* | Independent | 7,069 | 1.64 |
| Lee Van Katwyk | Independent | 7,063 | 1.63 |
| Liam McKenna* | Independent | 7,040 | 1.63 |
| Mark Helyar* | Independent | 6,980 | 1.61 |
| Steve Williams | Independent | 6,950 | 1.61 |
| John Gollop* | Independent | 6,860 | 1.59 |
| David Goy | Independent | 6,703 | 1.55 |
| Tom Rylatt | Forward Guernsey | 6,689 | 1.55 |
| Jennifer Strachan | Independent | 6,683 | 1.55 |
| Simon Vermeulen* | Independent | 6,228 | 1.44 |
| Munazza Malik | Independent | 6,215 | 1.44 |
| Jayne Ozanne | Independent | 6,197 | 1.43 |
| Andy Sloan | Independent | 6,081 | 1.41 |
| Bruno Kay-Mouat | Independent | 6,051 | 1.40 |
| Haley Camp | Independent | 5,886 | 1.36 |
| Garry Collins | Independent | 5,876 | 1.36 |
| Andrew Niles | Independent | 5,846 | 1.35 |
| Rob Curgenven | Independent | 5,738 | 1.33 |
| Neil Inder* | Independent | 5,651 | 1.31 |
| David Dorrity | Independent | 5,644 | 1.31 |
| Rhona Humphreys | Forward Guernsey | 5,630 | 1.30 |
| Sarah Hansmann Rouxel | Independent | 5,458 | 1.26 |
| Peter Ferbrache* | Independent | 5,437 | 1.26 |
| David Nussbaumer | Independent | 5,381 | 1.24 |
| Adrian Dilcock | Independent | 5,326 | 1.23 |
| Carl Meerveld | Independent | 5,225 | 1.21 |
| Susie Gallienne | Independent | 5,190 | 1.20 |
| Stuart Jehan | Forward Guernsey | 5,178 | 1.20 |
| John Dyke* | Independent | 5,097 | 1.18 |
| Sam Haskins* | Independent | 5,058 | 1.17 |
| Andrea Dudley-Owen | Independent | 5,016 | 1.16 |
| Paul Luxon | Independent | 4,979 | 1.15 |
| Lexi Lundberg | Independent | 4,934 | 1.14 |
| David De Lisle* | Independent | 4,827 | 1.12 |
| Victoria Oliver* | Independent | 4,783 | 1.11 |
| Simon Fairclough* | Independent | 4,780 | 1.11 |
| Susan Aldwell* | Independent | 4,688 | 1.08 |
| Nikki Symons | Independent | 4,676 | 1.08 |
| Rob Prow* | Independent | 4,583 | 1.06 |
| Kerensa Gardner | Independent | 4,529 | 1.05 |
| Nick Moakes* | Independent | 4,382 | 1.01 |
| Andy Le Lievre | Independent | 4,345 | 1.01 |
| Tammy Menteshvili | Independent | 4,328 | 1.00 |
| Ross Le Brun | Independent | 3,893 | 0.90 |
| Charlie Murray-Edwards | Independent | 3,857 | 0.89 |
| Mary Lowe | Independent | 3,760 | 0.87 |
| Sofi Noakes | Forward Guernsey | 3,661 | 0.85 |
| Heidi Almonte | Independent | 3,631 | 0.84 |
| Diane Mitchell | Independent | 3,279 | 0.76 |
| Jez Mercer | Independent | 3,200 | 0.74 |
| Chris Le Tissier* | Independent | 3,179 | 0.74 |
| Sally Gilman | Independent | 3,146 | 0.73 |
| Tony Corbin | Independent | 3,041 | 0.70 |
| Rob Harnish | Independent | 2,830 | 0.65 |
| Chris Machon | Independent | 2,704 | 0.63 |
| Timothy Carre | Independent | 2,152 | 0.50 |
| Steven Wall | Independent | 2,024 | 0.47 |
| Dicky Parmar | Forward Guernsey | 1,996 | 0.46 |
| Rosie Henderson | Independent | 1,926 | 0.45 |
| Art Allen | Independent | 1,873 | 0.43 |
| Tom Moore | Independent | 1,809 | 0.42 |
| Luke Graham | Independent | 1,721 | 0.40 |
| Kerry Barnfather | Independent | 1,665 | 0.39 |
| Barry Harris | Independent | 1,064 | 0.25 |
| Steph Shore | Independent | 945 | 0.22 |
| Christopher Nicolle | Independent | 631 | 0.15 |
| Total | | 432,212 | 100.00 |
| Total votes | | 19,686 | – |
| Registered voters/turnout | | 27,293 | 72.13 |
