= Education in Guernsey =

Committee for Education, Sport and Culture
- President: Andrea Dudley-Owen

General details
- Primary languages: English

Education in the Bailiwick of Guernsey is the combined education systems of Guernsey, Alderney and Sark. In Guernsey, it is overseen by the Education Section of the Committee for Education, Sport and Culture, part of the States of Guernsey. The States manage a number of island schools, including four comprehensive secondary schools, as well as the island's higher education facility, the Guernsey Institute. There are also a number of private schools on the island.

Students at States-maintained schools must attend primary school from Reception to Year 6 (ages 4 to 11; Early Years Foundation, Key Stage 1 and Key Stage 2) and secondary school from Year 7 to 11 (ages 11 to 16; Key Stage 3 and Key Stage 4). At the end of Year 11. students typically take General Certificate of Secondary Education (GCSE) exams or other Level 1 or Level 2 qualifications. For students who do not pursue academic qualifications until the end of Year 13, these qualifications are roughly equivalent to the completion of high school in many other countries.

Education is compulsory from the age of 5 to the age of 16, however students may take A-levels at one of the Sixth Form facilities on the island or take other Level 3 qualifications at the only FE college on the island. 87% of 16-year olds will stay in Education post-16. Education is free for all students up to the age of 18. After graduating from Sixth Form, many students will study off-island, typically in England, at a Higher Education institution or on-island at the Guernsey Institute.

The education system is roughly similar to that used in England, with GCSEs graded 9-1 since 2017. National school examinations and vocational education qualifications are the same as those issued by the UK Ofqual and follow the Regulated Qualifications Framework used in the UK.

== Reform ==
Following a vote in the States, a decision was made to merge the present secondary schools into one school, across two sites, to be called Lisia School, with the campuses called Victor Hugo College and Saumarez College. The plans were backed with a £157 million investment from the States of Guernsey in 2019.

However, following a vote in March 2020, the States agreed to pause the plans and the Committee conducted a review of secondary education models.

The proposals were:

- Two 11-18 colleges
- Three 11-18 colleges
- Two 11-16 colleges and one 11-18 college
- Three 11-18 colleges and a separate sixth form centre

All proposals focussed on the "one school" model, whereby executive leadership will be unified for the island.

In 2021, the States of Guernsey decided to push forward with the idea of three 11-16 schools and a separate Sixth Form Centre. This would mean the closure of La Mare de Carteret High School and the Guernsey Grammar School in 2023 and 2025 respectively. The sites chosen for the 11-16 schools were the current St Sampson's High School, Les Beaucamps High School, and the new Les Varendes High School, which opened on the site of the former Guernsey Grammar School in September 2023. It was also agreed that The Sixth Form Centre would relocate from the Les Varendes site to join The Guernsey Institute in a new sixth form college at Les Ozouets, the site of St Peter Port School, which will be demolished, and current site of the Princess Royal Centre for the Performing Arts (PRCPA), which is integrated into the plans of the new college building.

Due to delays and issues in construction of the new sixth form college, plans were proposed for the Sixth Form Centre to move to the current site of La Mare de Carteret High School when it closes in 2025. This was originally planned to just be for the 2025-26 academic year but this temporary move has now been extended until at least 2029.

In February 2025, a new law was passed to make it compulsory for schools in Guernsey to have a board of governors.

== List of currently operating schools ==
The following is a list of schools in Guernsey. For Sark and Alderney, see below.

=== Primary schools ===
- Amherst Primary School
- Elizabeth College Junior School at Acorn House and Beechwood
- Castel Primary School
- Forest Primary School
- Hautes Capelles Primary School
- Herm Primary School
- The Ladies' College Lower School
- La Mare de Carteret Primary School
- Les Voies School
- La Houguette Primary School
- Notre Dame du Rosaire Catholic Primary School
- St Martin's Primary School
- St Mary & St Michael Catholic Primary School
- Vale Primary School
- Vauvert Primary School

=== Secondary schools ===
- Les Varendes High School
- La Mare de Carteret High School
- Les Beaucamps High School
- St Sampson's High School

=== Post-16 Education ===
- The Sixth Form Centre
- The Guernsey Institute

=== Special schools ===
- Le Murier
- Le Rondin School & Centre

=== Independent schools ===
- Blanchelande College
- Elizabeth College
- Ladies' College

== Alderney and Sark ==
Alderney and Sark have their own schools, each offering primary education and some secondary education for their respective residents.

- St Anne's School, Alderney
- Sark School, Sark

== Closed schools ==
=== Primary, infant, and junior schools ===
==== St Saviour's School (c1860-1978) ====
A state-run school, closed in 1978. Its address was Le Neuf Chemin, St Saviour's, Guernsey. The building then became the special education school Mont Varouf until 2005, when it was converted into a community centre.

==== Vale Private School ( -2002) ====
An independent school which educated those aged 3 to 7, closed on 26 September 2002. Its address was Ville Es Pies, Vale, Guernsey, GY3 5NF.

==== Amherst Infant School ( -2003) ====
A state-run school which educated those age 5 to 7, closed on 1 September 2003. Its address was Meurepas Road, St Peter Port, Guernsey, GY1 2DS. Merged with Amherst Junior School to become Amherst Primary School.

==== Amherst Junior School ( -2003) ====
A state-run school which educated those age 7 to 11, closed on 1 September 2003. Its address was Guilles Road, St Peter Port, Guernsey, GY1 2DF. Merged with Amherst Infant School to become Amherst Primary School.

==== The Longfield Centre ( -2005) ====
A school which educated those aged 2 to 7, closed on 21 July 2005. Its address was Meurepas Road, St Peter Port, Guernsey, GY1 2DS.

==== Convent of Mercy ( -2005) ====
An independent school which educated those aged 3 to 7, closed on 31 July 2005. Supersceeded by Blanchelande College's infant department. Its address was Cordier Hill, St Peter Port, Guernsey, HY1 1JH

==== Hautes Capelles Infant School ( -2006) ====
A state run school which educated those aged 5 to 7, closed on 5 September 2006. Its address was Hautes Capelles, St Sampson, Guernsey, GY2 4GL. It merged with Hautes Capelles Junior School to become Hautes Capelles Primary School.

==== Hautes Capelles Junior School ( -2006) ====
A state-run school which educated those aged 7 to 11, closed on 5 September 2006. Its address was Capelles, St Sampsons, Guernsey, GY2 4GL. It merged with Hautes Capelled Infant School to become Hautes Capelles Primary School.

==== Vale Infant School ( -2013) ====
A state-run school which educated those aged 4 to 7, closed on 31 August 2013. Its address was Rue De L'ecole, Vale, Guernsey, GY3 5LN.

==== St Sampson's Infant School ( -2014) ====
A state-run school which educated those aged 4–7, closed on 31 August 2014. Its address was Rue Des Monts, St Sampson, Guernsey, GY2 4HS.

==== St Andrew's Primary School (1741-2015) ====
A state-run school which educated those aged 4 to 11, closed on 31 August 2015. Its address was Rue De La Boullerie, St Andrew's, Guernsey, GY6 8XD.

=== Secondary schools ===
==== Grammar School for Boys (1883-1985) ====
A state-run grammar school which educated those aged 11 to 16 until 1950 when those aged 16 to 18 could continue their education at the school. It was located at Granville house until 1894 when it moved to Brock Road. It closed in 1985 when it merged with the Grammar School for Girls to become the Guernsey Grammar School.

==== Grammar School for Girls (1895-1985) ====
A state-run grammar school which educated those 11 to 16 until 1950 when those aged 16 to 18 could continue their education at the school. It was located at Granville House until 1923 when it moved to Vauvert. It stayed there until 1928 when it moved to Rosaire Avenue. It closed in 1985 when it merged with the Grammar School for Boys to become the Guernsey Grammar School.

==== St Peter Port School (1968-2009) ====
A state-run school which educated those aged 11 to 16, it closed on 31 December 2009. Its address was Les Ozouets Road, St Peter Port, Guernsey, GY1 2UB. The former building was used for The Guernsey Institute until 2022, it is now slated for demolition to allow the construction of a new sixth form college.

==== Guernsey Grammar School (1985-2023) ====
A state-run grammar school which educated those aged 11 to 18, it closed on 31 July 2023. Its address was Les Varendes, St Andrew's, Guernsey, GY6 8TD. It has been superseded by Les Varendes High School.

=== Special schools ===
==== Mont Varouf School ( -2005) ====
A state-run school which educated those with special educational needs aged 3 to 19, closed on 21 July 2005. Its address was Le Neuf Chemin, St Saviour's, Guernsey, GY7 9FG. The former school building is now used as a community centre for the parish of St Saviour's.

=== Alderney ===
==== Ormer House Preparatory School ( -2013) ====
An independent school which educated those aged 3 to 11, closed on 31 December 2013. Its address was La Vallee, Alderney, Channel Islands, GY9 3XA.
