= LBHS =

LBHS may refer to:

- The ICAO airport code for Haskovo Malevo Airport in Bulgaria
- Laguna Beach High School, Laguna Beach, California, US
- Lake Brantley High School, Altamonte Springs, Florida, US
- Lemon Bay High School, Englewood, Florida, US
- Liberty Bell High School, Winthrop, Washington, US
- Long Bay High School, Providenciales, Turks and Caicos Islands (UK)
- Lord Beaverbrook High School, Calgary, Alberta, Canada
- Lord Botetourt High School, Daleville, Virginia, US
- Long Beach High School, multiple
- Long Branch High School, Long Branch, New Jersey, US
- Lucy Beckham High School, Mount Pleasant, South Carolina, US
- Les Beaucamps High School, Castel, Guernsey (UK)
