= Tramaine Brock =

American football player (born 1988)

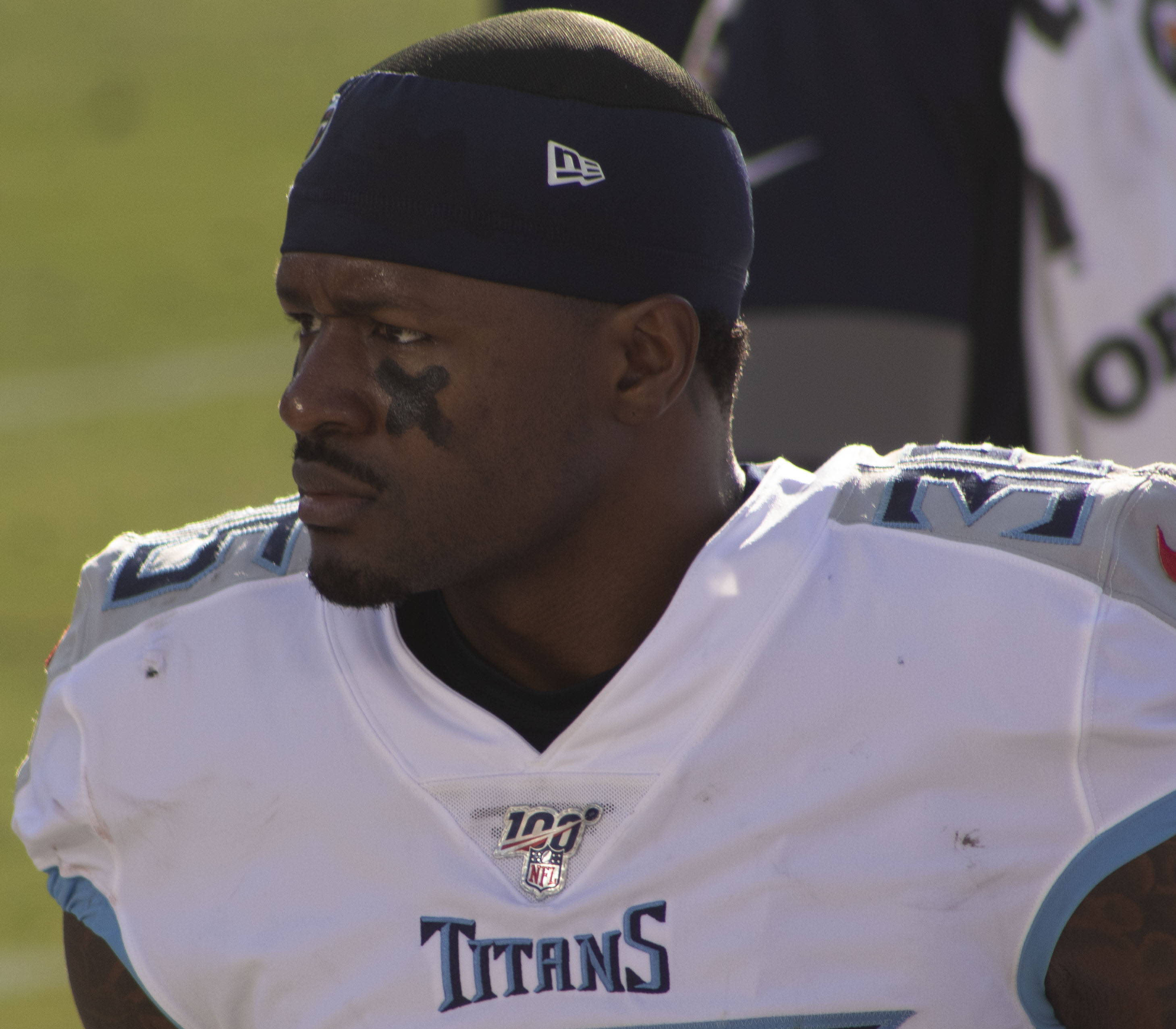
- Brock with the Tennessee Titans in 2019

No. 26, 24, 22, 20, 35, 31
- Position: Cornerback

Personal information
- Born: August 20, 1988 (age 38); Gulfport, Mississippi, U.S.
- Listed height: 6 ft 0 in (1.83 m)
- Listed weight: 188 lb (85 kg)

Career information
- High school: Long Beach (Long Beach, Mississippi)
- College: Mississippi Gulf Coast CC (2006–2007); Minnesota (2008); Belhaven (2009)
- NFL draft: 2010: undrafted

Career history
- San Francisco 49ers (2010–2016); Seattle Seahawks (2017)*; Minnesota Vikings (2017); Denver Broncos (2018); Arizona Cardinals (2019); Tennessee Titans (2019); Jacksonville Jaguars (2020)*; Detroit Lions (2020)
- * Offseason or practice squad member only

Career NFL statistics
- Total tackles: 267
- Forced fumbles: 1
- Pass deflections: 55
- Interceptions: 11
- Defensive touchdowns: 1
- Stats at Pro Football Reference

Tramaine Brock Sr. (born August 20, 1988) is an American former professional football player who was a cornerback in the National Football League (NFL). He played college football for the Minnesota Golden Gophers and Belhaven Blazers football before signing with the San Francisco 49ers as an undrafted free agent in 2010.

Brock spent his first seven years in the NFL with the 49ers, becoming a starter midway in the 2013 season. After an offseason stint with the Seattle Seahawks, he played in mostly reserve roles for the Minnesota Vikings in 2017 and the Denver Broncos in 2018. In 2019, Brock returned to a starting role playing for the Arizona Cardinals, which continued after he was claimed off waivers by the Tennessee Titans midway through the season. In 2020, he had an offseason stint with the Jacksonville Jaguars and also played in one game for the Detroit Lions.

== Early life ==
Brock attended and played football at Long Beach Senior High School in Long Beach, Mississippi, where he totaled 57 tackles and four interceptions as a junior.

== College career ==
Brock spent his freshman and sophomore years playing safety for Mississippi Gulf Coast Community College. As a sophomore, the Mississippi Gulf Coast Bulldogs had an undefeated season with a 12–0 record and a spot in the National Junior College Athletic Association (NJCAA) championship game which his team won by a margin of 62–28 over Kilgore College. That season, Brock recorded 59 tackles, 11 interceptions and two forced fumbles. During his time there, Brock was teammates with Terrence Cody.

In his junior year, Brock transferred to the University of Minnesota. He was made a starter and was third on the team in tackles with 73 while also recording an interception, six passes defended, three forced fumbles, and a fumble recovery. After only one season, Brock left the Minnesota after being suspended for failing to qualify academically.

In 2009, Brock transferred to Belhaven University of the National Association of Intercollegiate Athletics (NAIA) to finish out his senior year. He recorded 51 tackles, 2.5 sacks, six interceptions, 10 pass deflections, and a fumble recovery as a senior at Belhaven.

== Professional career ==
=== San Francisco 49ers ===
==== 2010 season ====
Brock signed as an undrafted free agent by the 49ers after going unselected in the 2010 NFL draft on April 26, 2010. The team later released him on September 14, but signed him to the practice squad the next day. On September 20, he signed on to the active roster. Brock would be released again on October 12, then re-signed on the practice squad two days later. He was signed to the active roster on October 27. Brock made his NFL debut against the Denver Broncos and that year only played in three games and recorded only four tackles.

==== 2011 season ====
In 2011, Brock played in 11 games, but missed three games due to a hand injury. That year, he recorded six tackles and two interceptions. Brock got his first interception in the first game of the season against the Seattle Seahawks and his second against the Dallas Cowboys the following week with an 18-yard return.

==== 2012 season ====
Brock later signed a one-year deal with the 49ers on March 12, 2012. During the 2012 season, Brock played all 16 games, mostly on special teams, and recorded 16 tackles. During a game against the St. Louis Rams, he forced a key fumble late in the game that led to a go-ahead score by the 49ers.

At the end of the 2012 season, Brock and the 49ers appeared in Super Bowl XLVII. He contributed on special teams, but the 49ers fell to the Baltimore Ravens by a score of 34–31.

==== 2013 season ====
In the 2013 offseason, Brock signed a $1.323 million tender with the 49ers keeping him there until the 2014 season.

Brock played all 16 regular-season games (seven starts) and opened all three postseason games, registering a career-best five interceptions. Brock added 35 tackles (33 solo) and 13 passes defensed, along with 11 tackles (eight solo) in three postseason games.

On October 6, 2013, Brock scored his first touchdown against the Houston Texans on an interception off quarterback Matt Schaub. Later in the game, Brock recorded his second interception of the game, making it the first multi-interception game in his career. Brock was named the team's third cornerback, replacing the injured Nnamdi Asomugha, who was later released by the team. After the game against the Texans, Brock was named NFC Defensive Player of the Week.

On November 22, 2013, Brock agreed to a four-year extension with the 49ers worth $16 million including $7 million in guaranteed money.

When Tarell Brown went down with a rib contusion in a Week 11 loss against the New Orleans Saints, Brock took over as duties as the starting cornerback. Brock was a key part of a memorable play in Week 16, on Monday Night Football against the Atlanta Falcons. The game was a rematch of the previous year's NFC Championship game and the last regular-season game at Candlestick Park. Matt Ryan had just thrown a 2-yard touchdown pass to Tony Gonzalez with 2:09 remaining to make it a 27–24 game. Atlanta recovered the subsequent onside kick and completed two quick passes to get down to the 49ers 10-yard line. On the next play, Brock deflected a pass by Matt Ryan, which was caught by teammate NaVorro Bowman. Bowman returned the interception 89 yards for a game-sealing touchdown. Brock finished the game with an interception in the end-zone as time expired.

==== 2014 season ====
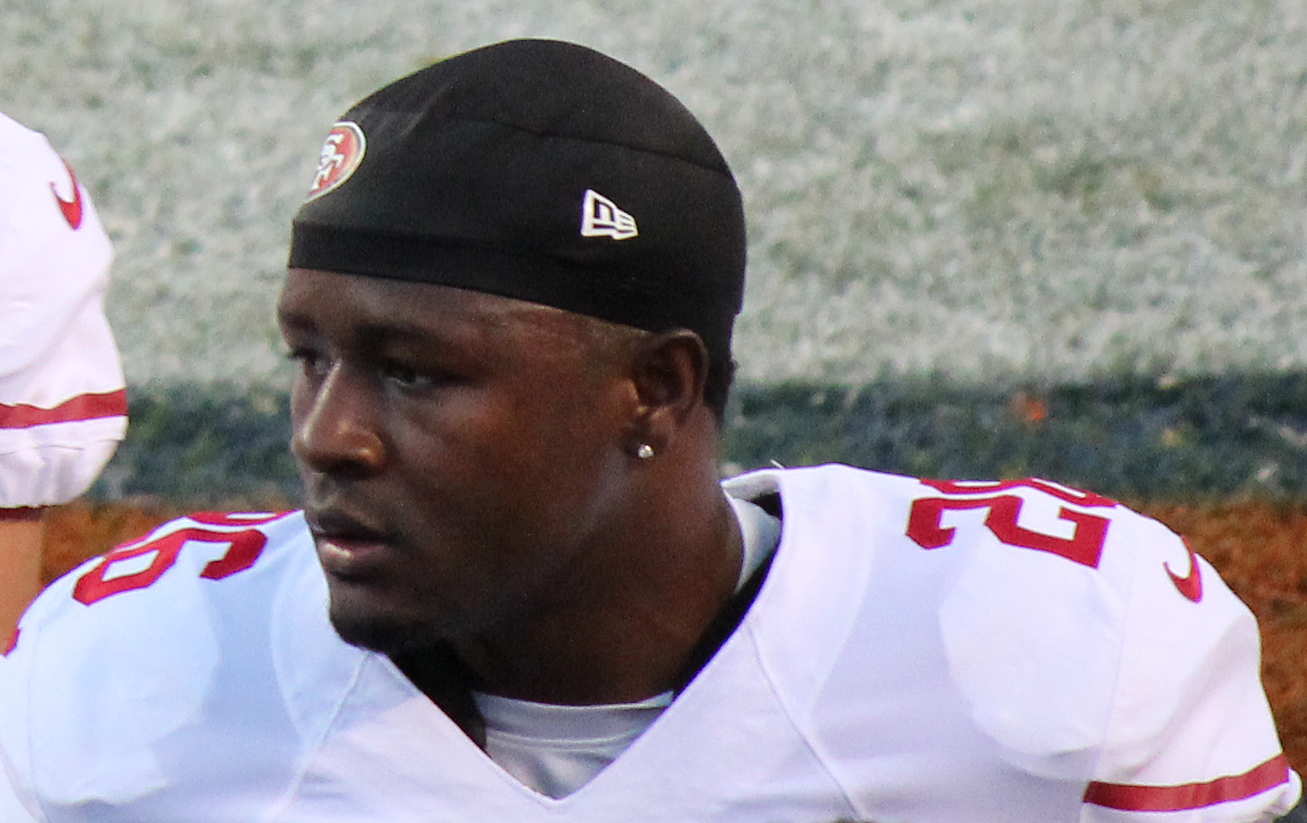
Brock in 2014

Brock's 2014 campaign was, unfortunately, a lost cause for him and the 49ers. He struggled with a toe injury throughout the majority of the season that he sustained in a Week 1 victory over the Dallas Cowboys and ended up only playing three games and recording seven tackles. Without the presence of their #1 corner, the 49ers struggled to find a consistent replacement to take over the nickel duties as they now moved Perrish Cox out of that position to fill Brock's role.

==== 2015 season ====
Brock started all 15 games that he played with the 49ers, posting 53 tackles (45 solo), three interceptions, and 11 passes defensed. Brock notched multiple passes defensed in three different games.

In the season-opener, he recorded three tackles as well as an interception against the Minnesota Vikings. During Week 5, Brock grabbed his second interception of the season against the New York Giants. As the second quarter was about to end, Manning tried to throw a touchdown to Beckham, but Brock's tight coverage gave him the interception. During Week 8 of the 2015 Season, Brock picked off quarterback Russell Wilson during the end of the second quarter to tie cornerback Kenneth Acker with the most interceptions on his team. According to Pro Football Focus, Brock received a +3.0 coverage grade by the end of Week 13.

==== 2016 season ====
In 2016, Brock started all 16 games for the first time in his career and finished the season with 59 combined tackles, 14 passes defended, an interception, and one forced fumble. He tallied more than five tackles in five different games throughout the season. During Week 16 against the Los Angeles Rams, Brock intercepted Jared Goff and returned it 39 yards as the 49ers narrowly won 22–21.

On April 7, 2017, Brock was released by the 49ers after a domestic violence incident.

=== Seattle Seahawks ===
On August 16, 2017, after his domestic violence case was dismissed, Brock signed with the Seattle Seahawks on a one-year deal.

=== Minnesota Vikings ===
On September 1, 2017, Brock was traded to the Minnesota Vikings for a 2018 seventh-round draft pick.

Brock appeared in 11 regular-season games and two playoff games with the Vikings. He recorded six tackles (five solo) and a pass deflection in addition to two special teams stops.

=== Denver Broncos ===
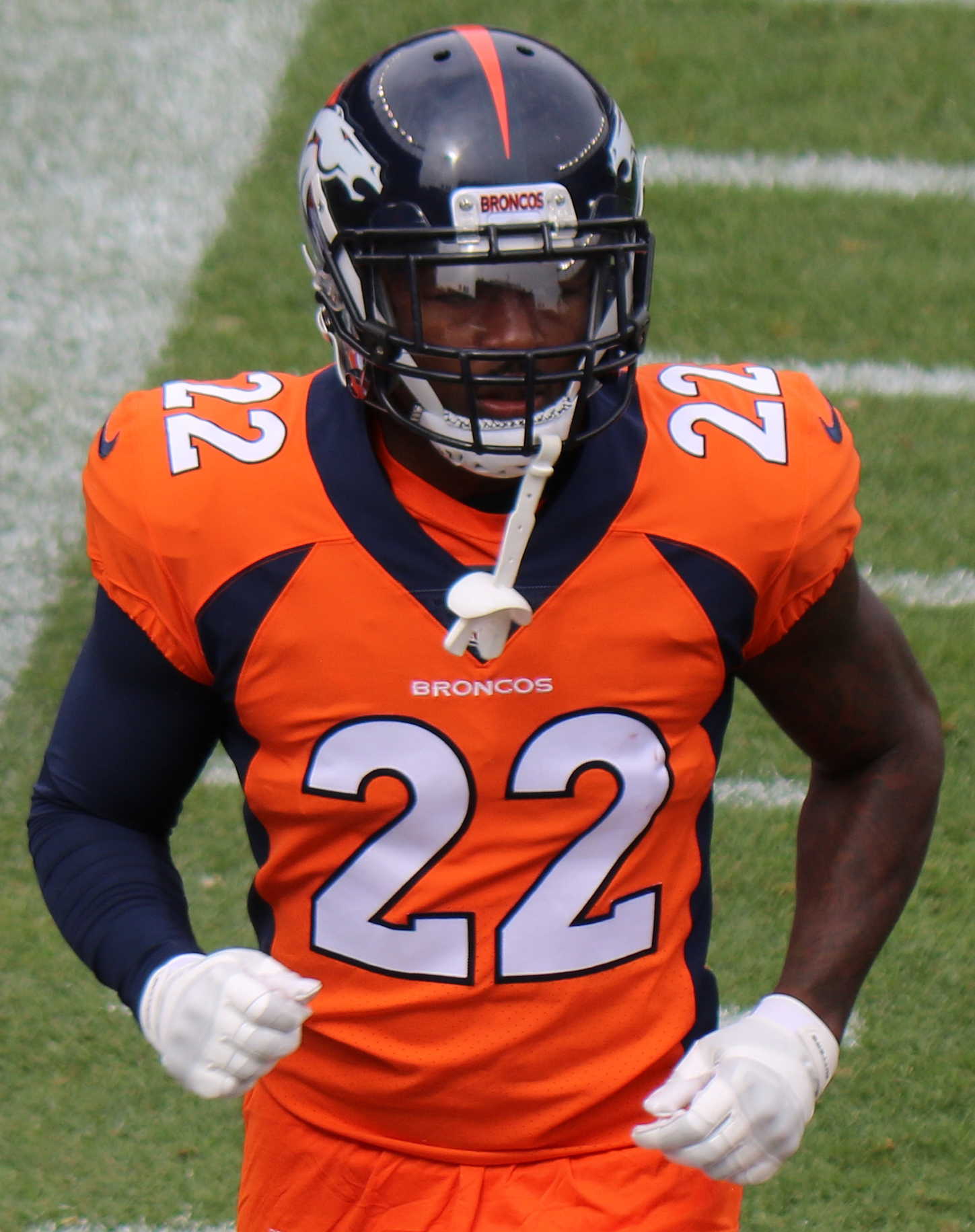
Brock in 2018

On March 14, 2018, Brock signed a one-year contract with the Denver Broncos. Coach Vance Joseph said Brock would compete with Bradley Roby for the No. 2 cornerback spot. He was named the third cornerback on the depth chart, playing in 12 games with five starts recording 23 tackles and six pass deflections.

=== Arizona Cardinals ===
On April 2, 2019, Brock signed a one-year contract with the Arizona Cardinals. He was named a starting cornerback opposite rookie Byron Murphy to begin the season in place of the suspended Patrick Peterson. Brock played in 10 games with seven starts before being released on December 2.

=== Tennessee Titans ===
On December 3, 2019, the Tennessee Titans claimed Brock off waivers.

=== Jacksonville Jaguars ===
On August 10, 2020, Brock signed with the Jacksonville Jaguars. He was placed on injured reserve on September 5, and was released with an injury settlement three days later.

=== Detroit Lions ===
On December 17, 2020, Brock signed with the practice squad of the Detroit Lions. He was elevated to the active roster on December 25 for the team's Week 16 game against the Tampa Bay Buccaneers and was reverted to the practice squad after the game.

== NFL career statistics ==
=== Regular season ===
Year	Team	Games		Tackles				Interceptions						Fumbles	
Year	Team	GP	GS	Comb	Total	Ast	Sack	PD	INT	Yds	Avg	Lng	TD	FF	FR
2010	SF	3	0	4	3	1	0.0	0	0	0	0.0	0	0	0	0
2011	SF	11	0	5	5	0	0.0	4	2	18	9.0	18	0	0	0
2012	SF	16	0	16	14	2	0.0	1	0	0	0.0	0	0	0	0
2013	SF	16	7	37	35	2	0.0	13	5	82	16.4	41	1	0	0
2014	SF	3	2	7	7	0	0.0	0	0	0	0.0	0	0	0	0
2015	SF	15	15	53	45	8	0.0	11	3	26	8.7	26	0	0	0
2016	SF	16	16	59	49	10	0.0	14	1	39	39.0	39	0	1	0
2017	MIN	11	0	8	6	2	0.0	1	0	0	0.0	0	0	0	0
2018	DEN	12	5	23	19	4	0.0	6	0	0	0.0	0	0	0	0
2019	ARI	10	7	37	34	3	0.0	3	0	0	0.0	0	0	0	0
2019	TEN	4	4	13	11	2	0.0	2	0	0	0.0	0	0	0	0
Career		117	56	262	228	34	0.0	55	11	165	15.0	41	1	1	0

=== Postseason ===
Year	Team	Games		Tackles				Interceptions						Fumbles	
Year	Team	GP	GS	Comb	Total	Ast	Sack	PD	INT	Yds	Avg	Lng	TD	FF	FR
2011	SF	2	0	2	2	0	0.0	0	0	0	0.0	0	0	0	0
2012	SF	3	0	3	3	0	0.0	0	0	0	0.0	0	0	0	0
2013	SF	3	3	11	8	3	0.0	0	0	0	0.0	0	0	0	0
2017	MIN	2	0	0	0	0	0.0	0	0	0	0.0	0	0	0	0
2019	TEN	3	3	11	11	0	0.0	3	0	0	0.0	0	0	0	0
Career		13	6	27	24	3	0.0	3	0	0	0.0	0	0	0	0

== Legal issues ==
On April 7, 2017, Brock was arrested in Santa Clara County, California following an alleged incident which left his children's mother with visible injuries. Because of this incident, Brock was released by the 49ers. On August 9, the case against Brock was dismissed due to a lack of evidence. On January 5, 2018, the NFL formally cleared Brock from violation of the league's personal conduct policy.
