= Saumarez Park =

Public park in Guernsey

- Interactive map of Saumarez Park
- Type: Public park
- Location: Parish Castel, Guernsey, Channel Islands
- Coordinates: 49°28′N 2°35′W
- Created: 19th century
- Operator: States of Guernsey
- Status: Open year round

Saumarez Park is the largest public park on the island of Guernsey.

== The Park ==
The park, one of the island's main social venues, is located in the Parish of Castel, about 4 km from the centre of Saint Peter Port. It contains various facilities, including the National Trust of Guernsey's Folk & Costume Museum, a cafe, a large children's playground, large open grass lawns, a rose garden, and a duck pond. A nature trail links the park with nearby Cobo Bay on the north shore of the island.

In 1869, Baron James Saumarez (1843–1937), grandson of Admiral James Saumarez, 1st Baron de Saumarez, who had acquired the property through his marriage in 1788 with Martha Le Marchant, exercised his droit de retraite (right of redemption) to buy Saumarez Park and the nearby Le Guet estate, after his father had put the property up for sale. A diplomat who travelled widely in his career, he created a set of exotic gardens, which included a bamboo walk, a Japanese garden, a camelia lawn, a rose garden and a walled garden. After his death Saumarez Park was acquired by the States of Guernsey.

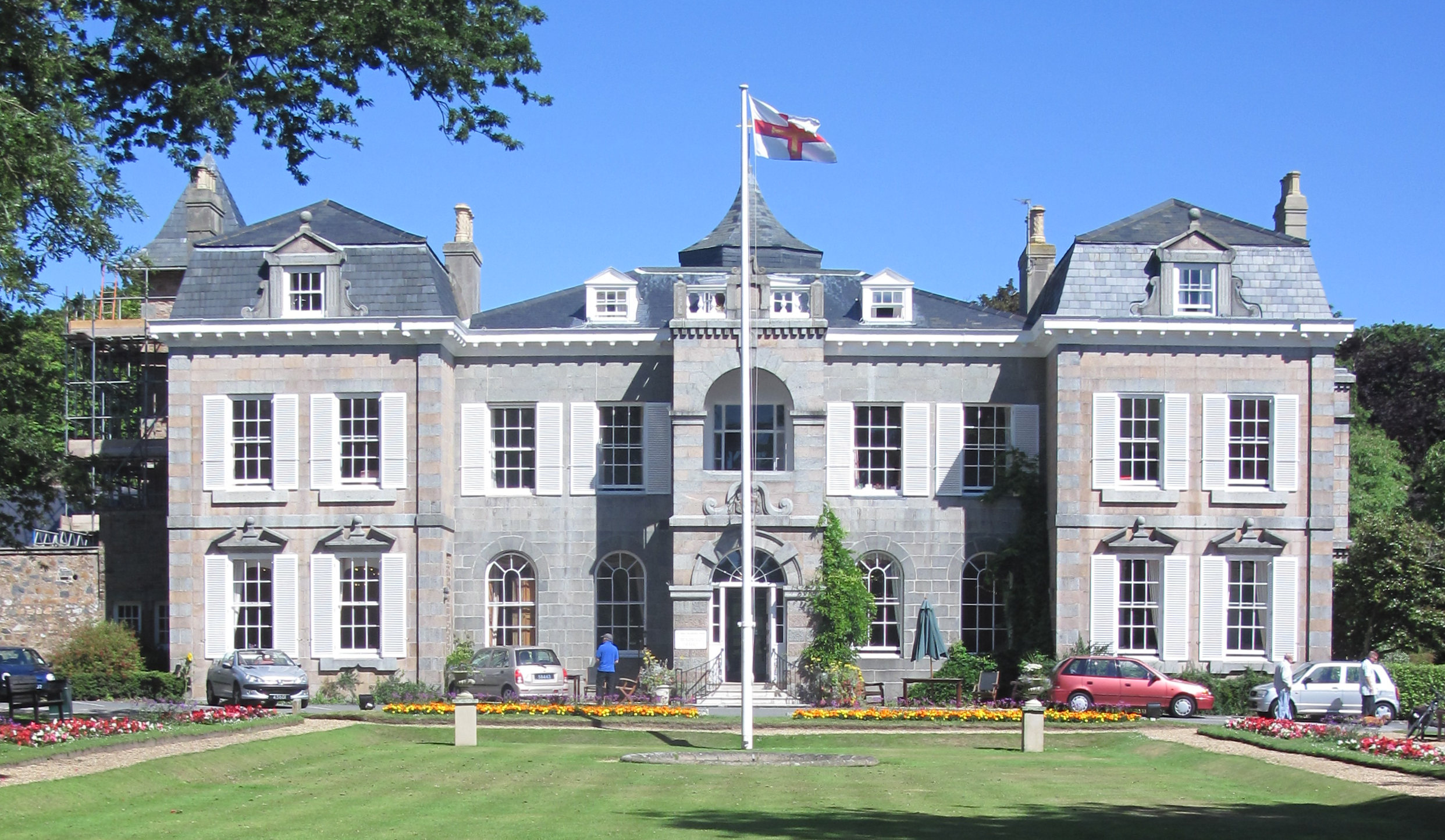
Saumarez Park Manor

The park is open all year round from dawn until dusk. Entry is free of charge, except when certain events are held when there are charges for parking and entry.

== Saumarez Park Manor ==
The large manor house is today a residential care and nursing home.

== Folk & Costume Museum ==
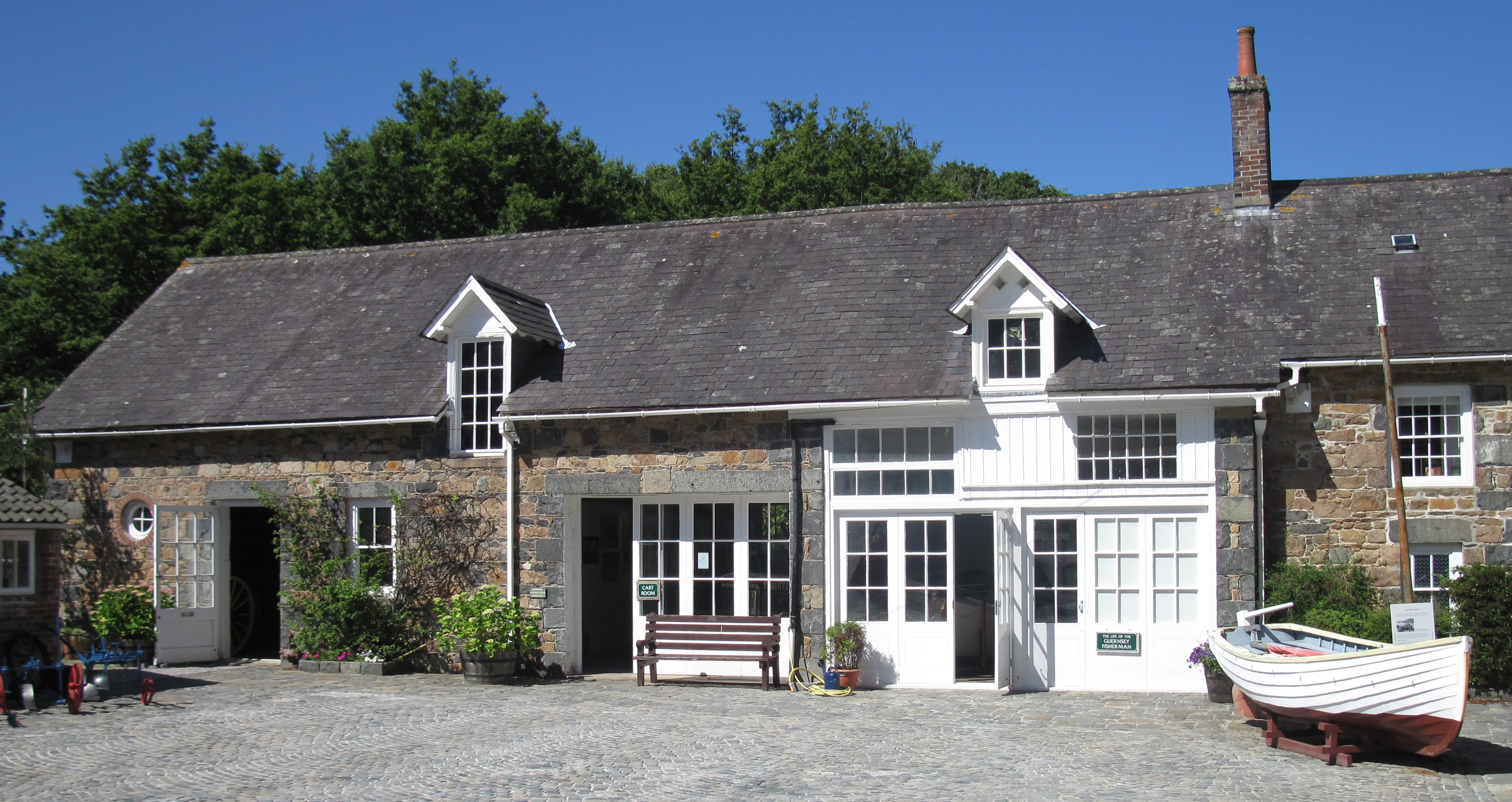
Part of the Folk & Costume Museum

Situated within the park, near the Victorian walled garden, is the National Trust of Guernsey's Folk & Costume Museum. It is housed in a cluster of meticulously restored traditional farm buildings and showcases Guernsey’s heritage with exhibitions covering domestic life, farming, fishing and sea-faring. In addition, special exhibitions from the more than 8000 pieces of its nationally acclaimed costume collection are on display throughout every season.

== Annual events ==
The Park has played host for many years to Le Viaër Marchi, a fund raising event for the National Trust of Guernsey in early July, the Lions Club of Guernsey's Donkey Derby in mid August; and the North Show and Battle of Flowers in late August.
