= 2001 Castel by-election =

Local election in Guernsey

- 21 March 2001

Castel district
- Registered: 4,269
- Turnout: 39.64%
Deputy before election
David John Nussbaumer
Independent
Elected Deputy
Hunter Adam
Independent

The 2001 Castel by-election was held in the States of Guernsey district of Castel on 21 March 2001, following the resignation of deputy David John Nussbaumer due to other time commitments and frustrations with the current government. Medical doctor Hunter Adam was elected with 27.51% of the vote, defeating Pat Wisher and five other candidates.

There were two polling stations at Castel Douzaine Room and Beaucamp Road.

== Results ==
2001 Castel by-election
Party	Candidate	Votes	%
Independent	Hunter Adam	466	27.51%
Independent	Pat Wisher	363	21.43%
Independent	Barry Paint	326	19.24%
Independent	Keith Tostevin	199	11.75%
Independent	Andrew Linehan	196	11.57%
Independent	Michael Bourgaize	86	5.08%
Independent	Gordon Young	24	1.42%
Majority		103	6.08%
Rejected ballots		34	2.01%
Total votes		1,694	100.0%
Turnout		1,694	39.64%
Registered electors		4,269	
