= Little Chapel =

Historical chapel and sight-seeing attraction in Guernsey

The Little Chapel
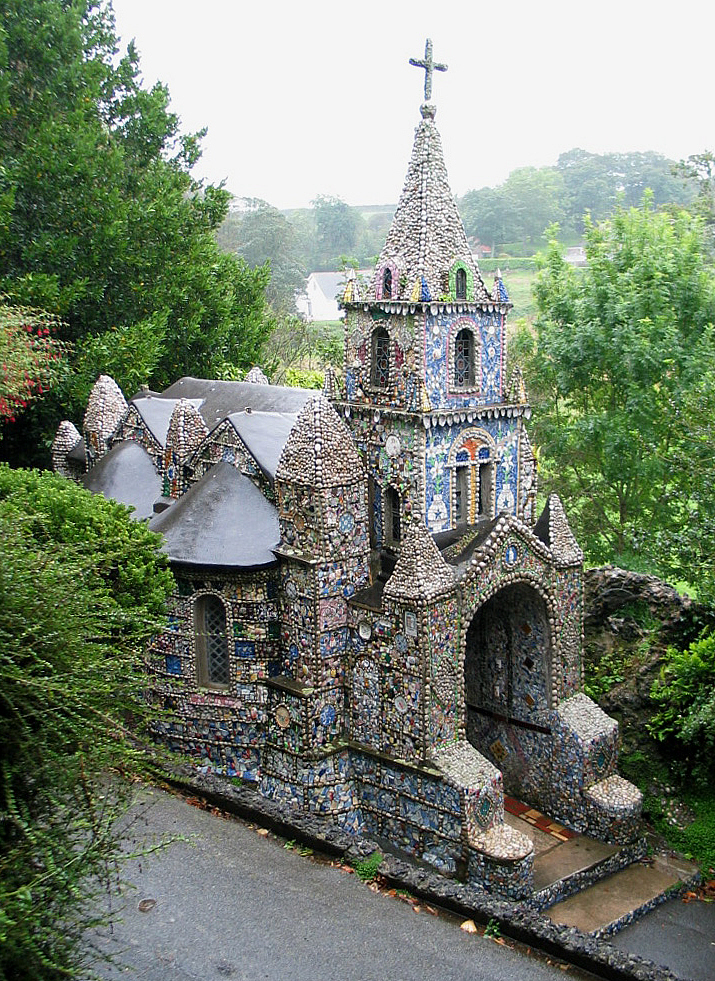
- The Little Chapel

Religion
- Affiliation: Non-denominational
- Region: Guernsey
- Status: Active

Location
- Municipality: St Andrew
- Interactive map of The Little Chapel
- Coordinates: 49°26′33.23″N 2°35′15.58″W

Architecture
- Groundbreaking: 1923

Specifications
- Length: 16 feet (4.9 m)
- Width: 9 feet (2.7 m)

Website
- www.thelittlechapel.gg

The Little Chapel is situated in the Les Vauxbelets valley, Saint Andrew, Guernsey. It was created in July 1914, by Brother Déodat. He planned to create a miniature version of the grotto and basilica at Lourdes, the Rosary Basilica.

The chapel has been described as "probably the biggest tourist attraction in Guernsey", and "intricate".

== History ==
The first chapel was built by Brother Déodat in March 1914 (measuring 9 feet long by 4.5 feet wide). After taking criticism from other brothers, Déodat demolished the chapel. He finished a second chapel in July 1914 (measuring 9 feet by 6 feet). However, when the Bishop of Portsmouth visited in 1923, he could not fit through the door, so Déodat again demolished it. The third and this current version of the chapel started soon after the last demolition, and measures 16 feet by 9 feet. Déodat went to France in 1939 and died there, never having seen his chapel finished.

In 1977, a committee was established to restore the chapel, and for a time fell under the care of Blanchelande College. It is now looked after by the Little Chapel Foundation.

The Chapel suffered from vandalism in 2003 and again in 2010 when five stained glass windows were smashed, causing £3,000 worth of damage leading to condemnation of the vandals.

In 2013, there was major work on the overgrowth which was, in places, hiding parts of the chapel.

In November 2015 it was closed to allow some major structural work to be undertaken. The works include underpinning the building, stabilising the foundations and weatherproofing the building, and are estimated to cost £500,000. Fundraising was undertaken.

Fully open again to the public in April 2017, the major works such as stabilising the foundations are complete however additional fundraising is needed to finish the final phase of renovation.

== Decoration ==
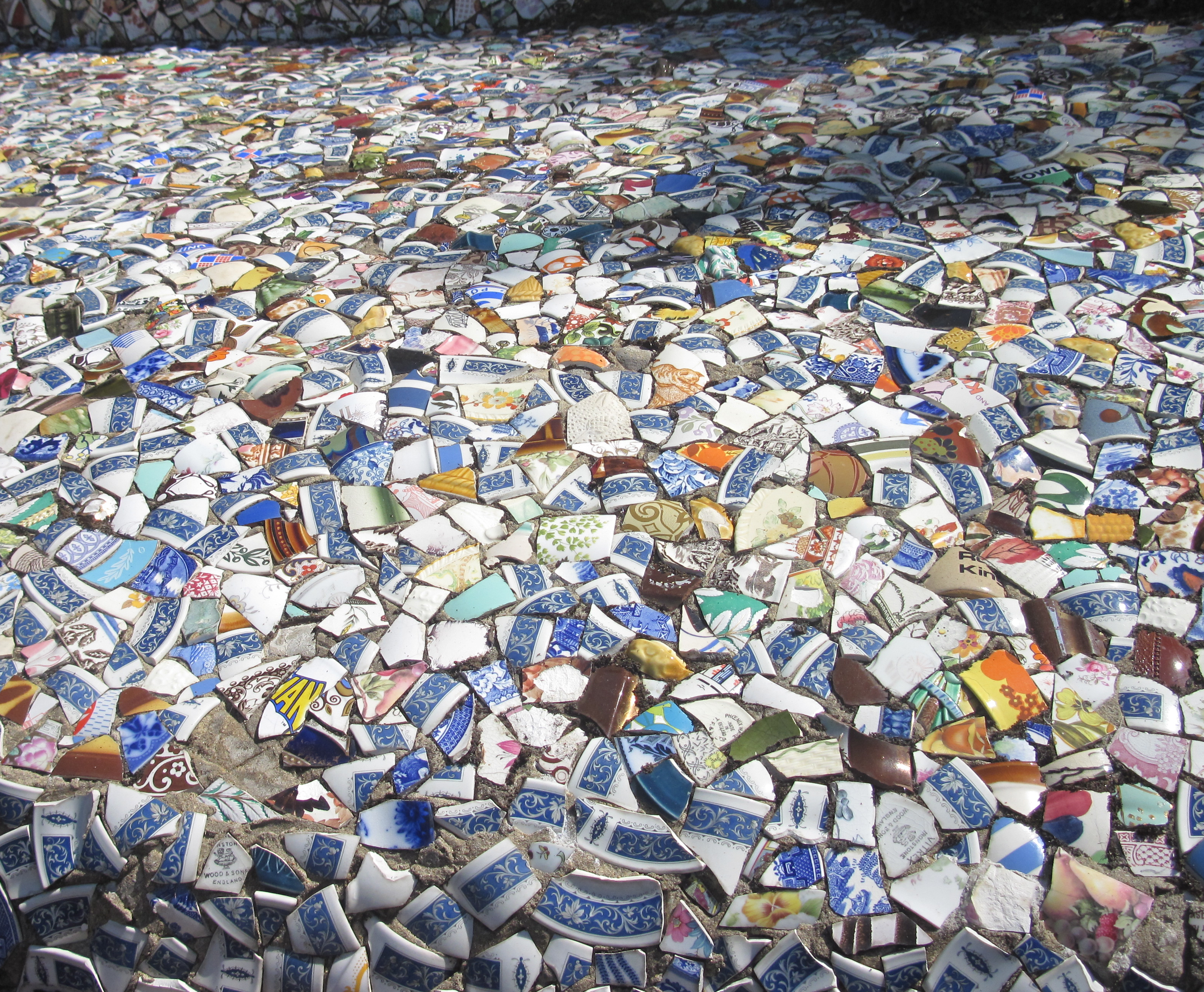
Surfaces of the chapel are covered with broken china

The Little Chapel is decorated with seashells, pebbles, and broken china. "From a distance the colours and design make a pleasing whole, close-up it's amazing to see all the different pieces used to create the effect." It has room for around eight people.

The chapel was brought sudden fame following a Daily Mirror article, which led to islanders donating coloured china; the Lieutenant-Governor of the island offered mother of pearl, and other gifts came from around the globe.

The mosaic style is "pique-assiette" or "Picassiette" (a French term based on a pun blending pique-assiette – literally, plate-pincher, the sort of person crashing into a party to enjoy a free meal – and famous artist Pablo Picasso). According to Mosaic Art Source, "[P]ieces of broken pottery, china, glass, buttons, figurines, and/[or] jewelry are cemented onto a base to create a new surface. Almost any form can be used as a base, and any combination of pieces can be applied, restricted only by the individual creator's imagination." The style was the nickname of a French Art Brut artist, Raymond Isidore, who decorated his house near Chartres, known as Maison Picassiette, much in the same style as the Little Chapel.

== In media ==
Film of walking around the chapel in 1948 is held by the Cinema Museum in London Ref HM0364

The Little Chapel features in the game Guernsey Monopoly, part of the Monopoly board game series, which was released in 2013.
