= Vale, Guernsey =

Parish in northeastern Guernsey

Coordinates: 49°29′34″N 2°31′22″W

Vale
- Parish
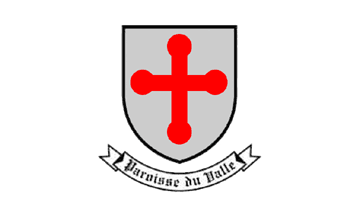
- Flag

- Location of Vale in Guernsey
- Crown Dependency: Guernsey, Channel Islands

Government
  - Electoral district: Vale

Area
  - Total: 8.8 km^{2} (3.4 sq mi)
  - Rank: Ranked 2nd

Population (2019)
  - Total: 9,514
  - Density: 1,100/km^{2} (2,800/sq mi)
- Time zone: GMT
  - Summer (DST): UTC+01
- Website: valeparish.gg

Vale (Guernésiais: Lé Vale; French: Le Valle) is one of the ten parishes of Guernsey in the Bailiwick of Guernsey, Channel Islands.

In 933 the islands, formerly under the control of William I, then Duchy of Brittany were annexed by the Duchy of Normandy. The island of Guernsey and the other Channel Islands represent the last remnants of the medieval Duchy of Normandy.

Much of the Vale parish belonged to the fief of Saint Michael. Robert of Normandy had apparently been caught in a storm; his ship had ended up safe in Guernsey, and he granted the fief in 1032. Since then, the Benedictine monks lived in an abbey that had been built next to the Vale Church. These monks benefited from the fief. The rights to the fief were removed by Henry VIII when he undertook the Dissolution of the Monasteries.

== Vale Castle ==
The Castle of Saint Michael, now called Vale Castle, has an origin going back at least 1,000 years and was used as a refuge from pirate attacks. It was probably started in the late 10th century. In 1372 Owain Lawgoch, a claimant to the Welsh throne, attacked Guernsey at the head of a free company, on behalf of France. This event is popularly called La Descente des Aragousais. Owain Lawgoch withdrew after killing 400 of the Island militia. The poem of the same name refers to the castle as the Château de l'Archange, the location of the last-ditch stand against the insurgents.

In 1615 the island was required to maintain the Vale Castle, while the Crown maintained Castle Cornet. It has been a focal point for defence; the most recent modifications were undertaken by the German occupiers.

== Modern era ==
Until 1806 the parish occupied territory on the mainland of Guernsey, the Vingtaine de l'Epine, as well as the whole of Le Clos du Valle, a tidal island forming the northern extremity of Guernsey separated from the mainland by Le Braye du Valle, a tidal channel. Le Braye was drained and reclaimed in 1806 by the British Government as a defence measure. Vale now consists of two non-contiguous territories.

The Vale postal code starts with either GY3 or GY6 (the latter also used for St. Andrew).

== Features ==
The features of the parish include:

- Churches:
  - Vale Parish Church, St Michel du Valle
  - Vale Mission Fellowship
  - St Pauls Methodist Church
- Parish war memorial at Vale Avenue-Braye Road Cross Roads
- Bordeaux Harbour
- The Vale Mill (the parishes most prominent landmark)
- Northern half of Saint Sampson's Town
- Northern half of Saint Sampson's Harbour
- Vale Pond, nature reserve
- Beaucette marina
- Military:
  - Parish war memorial at Vale Avenue-Braye Road Cross Roads
  - Vale Castle
  - Fort le Marchant
  - Fort Doyle
  - Fort Pembroke
  - Rousse Tower
  - Eight Guernsey loophole towers numbered 4 to 11
  - Beaucette Battery dating from the Napoleonic Wars
  - La Lochande Battery dating from the Napoleonic Wars
  - Nid L'Herbe Battery and Magazine dating from the Napoleonic Wars
  - Portinfer Battery dating from the Napoleonic Wars
  - German fortifications, built during the occupation 1940-45
- Archaeology:
  - Le Dolmen de Déhus, which incorporates a megalithic art carving known as Le Gardien
  - La Varde passage grave, the largest dolmen on the island
  - Les Fouaillages, L'Ancresse Common
  - La Platte Mare, cist in circle
  - La Mare es Mauves, cist in circle
  - Martelo 7, cist in circle
- Beaches
  - Pembroke(MCS recommended)
  - L'Ancresse
  - Ladies Bay
  - Bordeaux Harbour
- A number of protected buildings

The parish of the Vale hosts:

- Guernsey Electricity Power Station
- Fort le Marchant shooting range
- numerous industrial premises
- Maison Maritaine
- Vale Douzaine Room
- Vale Primary School
- 18 hole golf course on L'Ancresse Common
- Annual music festival 'Vale Earth Fair' at the Vale Castle
- numerous quarries
- many old and some still in use, vineries. (greenhouses)
- Countryside walks
- A weekly 5 km Parkrun event

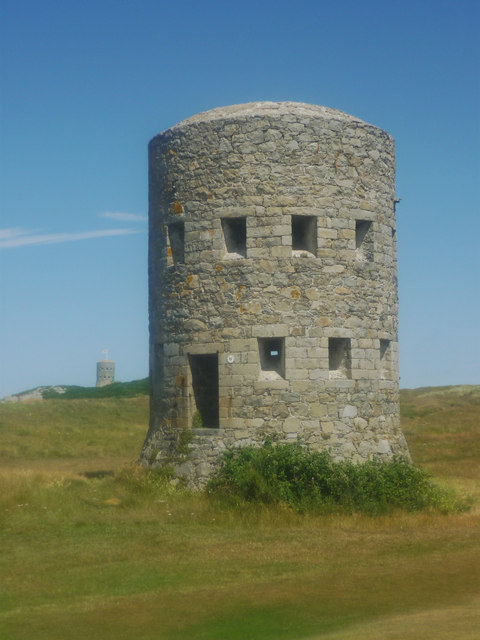
L'Ancresse Loophole Tower no. 6

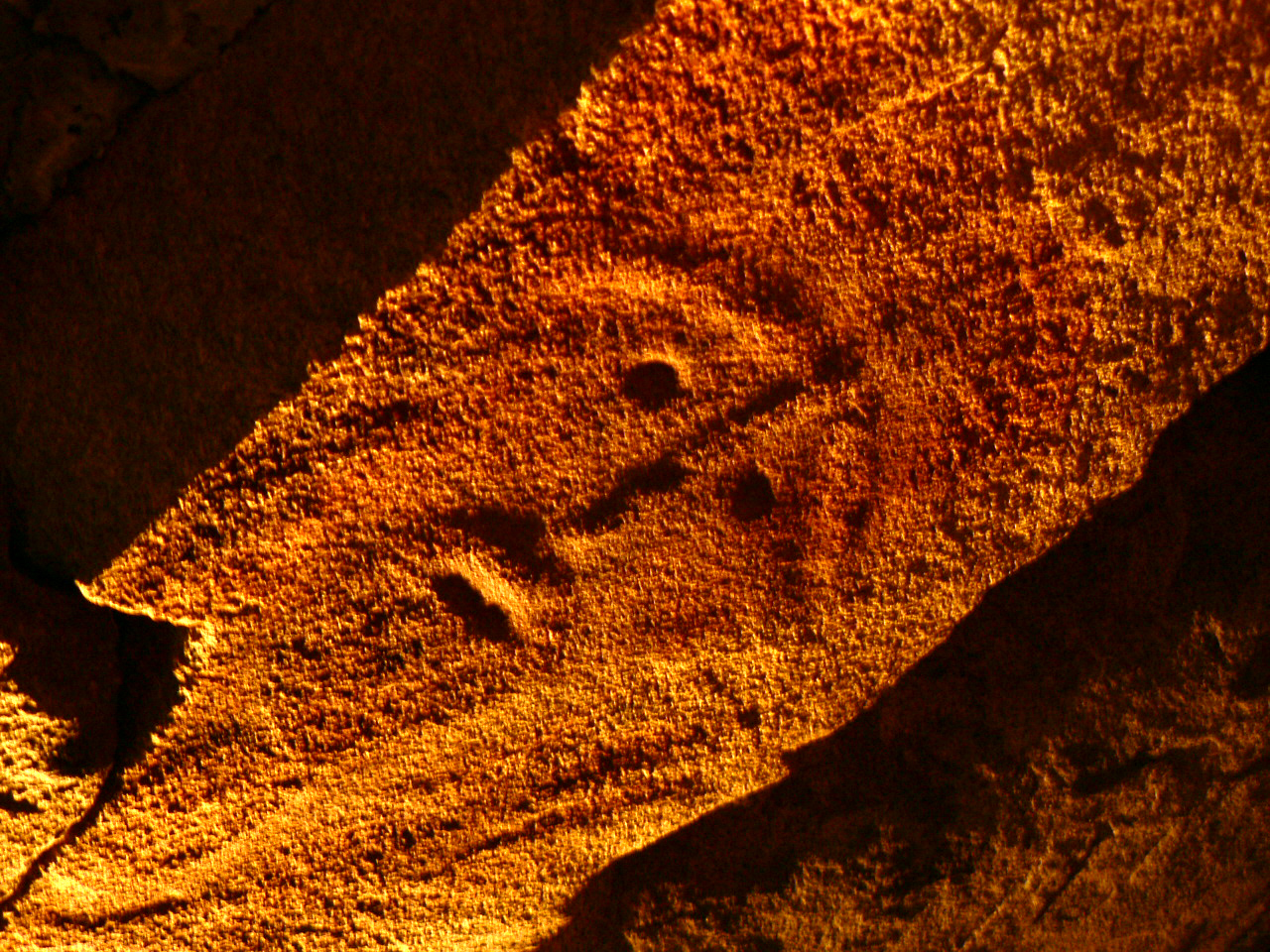
Le Gardien of Le Dolmen de Déhus

== Other ==
The parish was twinned with the Normandy port of (France) Barneville-Carteret in 1987.

== Politics ==
Vale comprised the whole of the Vale administrative division, until the 2018 referendum implemented a single constituency.

In the 2016 Guernsey general election, there was a 3,774 or 74% turnout to elect six Deputies. Those elected were (in order of votes received) Matt Fallaize, Dave Jones, Mary Lowe, Laurie Queripel, Jeremy Smithies and Sarah Hansmann Rouxel.

Dave Jones died in July 2016 and a by-election was held in October 2016 to elect a replacement.
