= Les Varendes High School =

Coordinates: 49.450°N 2.570°W

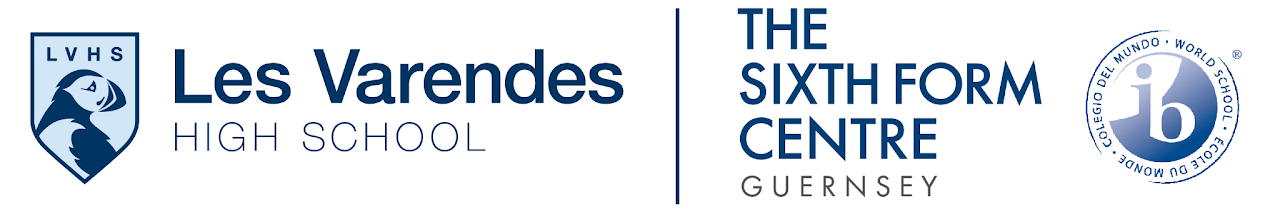

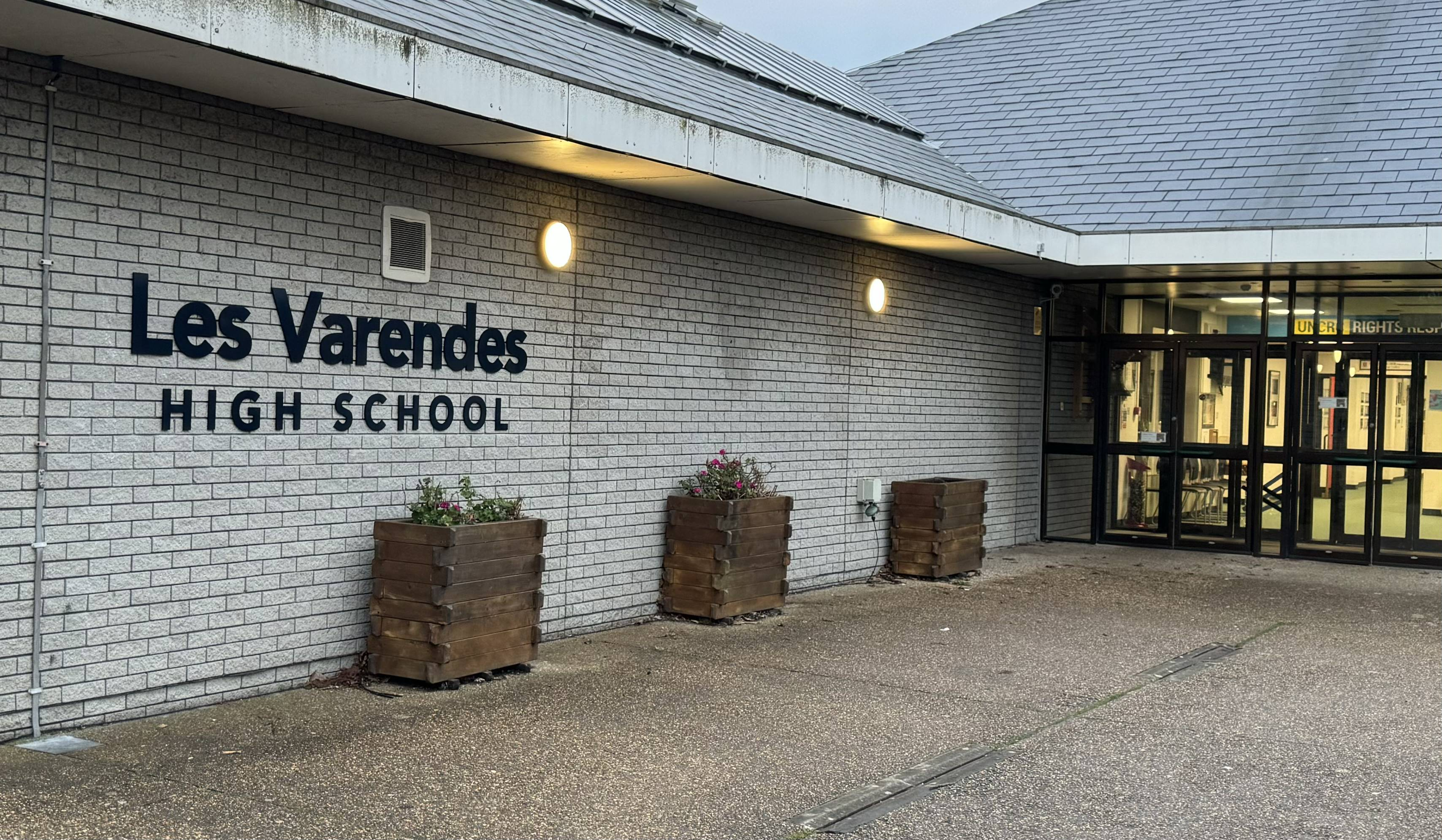
- Les Varendes; St Andrew's, Guernsey, Channel Islands, GY6 8TD

Information
- Former name: Guernsey Grammar School & Sixth Form Centre
- Motto: Norman French: Qui veult peult (Those who want to, can)
- Established: September 2023
- Head teacher: Verona Tomlin
- Age range: 11-18
- Website: https://sites.google.com/web.grammar.sch.gg/parentportal/home?authuser=0

Les Varendes High School is a non-selective, state-funded secondary school in Saint Andrew, Guernsey. It takes in students from Amherst, Notre Dame, St Mary and St Michael, and Vauvert primary schools.

It was formerly known as the Guernsey Grammar School and Sixth Form Centre, which was a co-educational state-funded grammar school. The school was renamed to its current name in 2023 following the removal of the eleven-plus and a merger with La Mare de Carteret High School.

== History ==
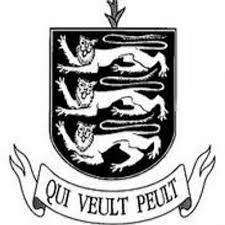
The Guernsey Grammar School logo

In 2019 the States of Guernsey removed the eleven-plus. The school began to take non-selective cohorts of students, meaning that, whilst up to September 2023 it had some selective Grammar School students, it now has all high school students.

The school was renamed to Les Varendes High School in September 2023, as the last selective grammar group left the school, marking a progression in the restructuring of Guernsey's education system, which would see the school merge with La Mare de Carteret High School.

=== The Sixth Form Centre ===
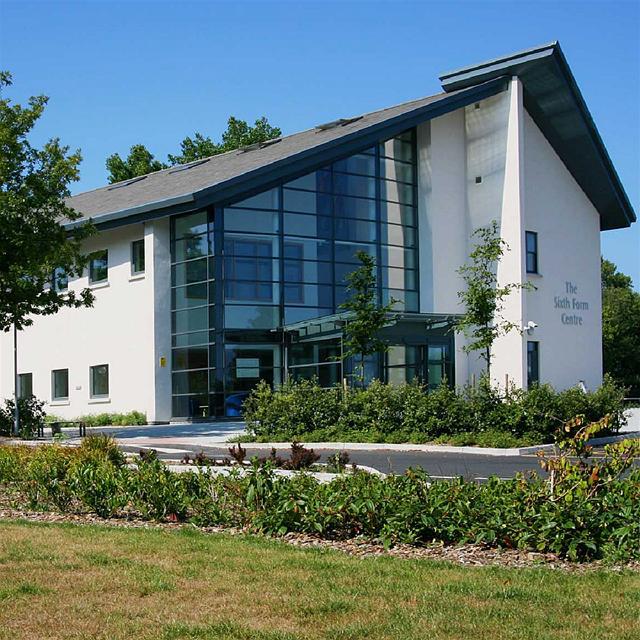
The former Sixth Form Centre building

Public sixth form education in Guernsey began in 1950, when the intermediate schools (boys & girls grammar schools) were given permission to keep students until 18. The Boys and Girls Grammar Schools merged at Sixth Form level in January 1972 with a new, mixed 11-18 Grammar School being built in 1982 and opened in 1985.

Originally, the sixth form was located on the upper floor of the Grammar School building, where the lower and upper sixth common rooms were located. The new Sixth Form Centre building was completed in August 2005 and is linked to the rest of the building through a glazed walkway known as 'the link'. This building provided additional, specialist, teaching spaces for subjects such as sports, business, economics, media, film studies, psychology, and sociology.

September 2024 saw the separation of The Sixth Form Centre with Les Varendes High School, with the sixth form later relocating to the current La Mare De Carteret High School building the following year. It will remain there until at least 2029 due to delays in the States of Guernsey obtaining funding for the construction of the new Sixth Form Centre alongside The Guernsey Institute at Les Ozouets.

The building is now used as offices by the Education Department of the States of Guernsey.

== See also ==
- List of schools in Guernsey
