= Long Beach High School =

Long Beach High School may refer to:

- Long Beach Polytechnic High School, serving Long Beach, California
- Long Beach High School (Mississippi) serving Long Beach, Mississippi
- Long Beach High School (New York), serving Long Beach, New York and the surrounding school district
