= St Sampson's High School =

Secondary school in Guernsey

Coordinates: 49.4794°N 2.5419°W

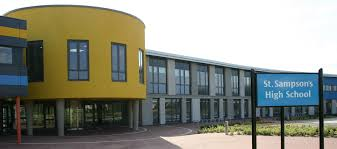

Location
- Rue de Dol, St Sampson's, Guernsey; GY2 4DA

Information
- Funding type: State-funded
- Motto: Learning Together
- Opened: 2008
- Department for Education URN: 132505 Tables
- Principal: Vicky Godley
- Age range: 11-16

St Sampson's High School is a state-funded secondary school in Guernsey that caters to the needs of pupils from eleven to sixteen. The school is co-located with special-school Le Murier in the parish of St Sampson.

== History ==
St Sampson's High School was opened in 2008, to serve as a replacement to the old St Sampson's secondary school, and the St Peter Port secondary school. Both the original schools have now been transformed into colleges of further education, while their pupils have moved to the newer St Sampson's High.

== Difficulties ==
=== Educational ===
Problems in the Guernsey state-funded schools have been highlighted in the Mulkerrin report on the Education Services in Guernsey. The report claims that the percentage of St Sampson's High School students who attained five A*–C GCSE grades in 2011 was only 38%.

5+ A*–C including English and Maths
School	2012	2013	2014	2015
Grammar School	97.1	95.9	98.1	96.2
La Mare de Carteret High	42	23.4	40.6	32
Les Beaucamps High	51.5	40.8	53.8	42.3
St. Anne's, Alderney	31.6	35.7	46.2	42.9
St. Sampson's High	44.3	33.1	52.2	32.9

In 2016, St Sampsons High students received 42% of grades from A*–C grade, 10% more than the previous year.

== See also ==
- List of schools in Guernsey
