= Long Beach School District =

Public school district in Mississippi

Coordinates: 30.370118°N 89.164966°W

Location
- 19148 Commission Rd; Long Beach, Mississippi United States

District information
- Type: Public
- Grades: K–12
- Superintendent: Talia Lock
- Schools: 5
- Budget: $24,760,977 (FY 2013)

Students and staff
- District mascot: Bearcat
- Colors: Maroon and White

Other information
- Website: www.lbsdk12.com

The Long Beach School District is a public school district based in Long Beach, Mississippi (United States).

== Schools ==
- Long Beach High School
  - 2007 National Blue Ribbon School
- Long Beach Middle School
- Harper McCaughan Elementary School
- Thomas L. Reeves Elementary School
  - 2000-2001 National Blue Ribbon School
- W. J. Quarles Elementary School

== Demographics ==
=== 2006-07 school year ===
There were a total of 2,818 students enrolled in the Long Beach School District during the 2006–2007 school year. The gender makeup of the district was 50% female and 50% male. The racial makeup of the district was 13.45% African American, 81.41% White, 1.70% Hispanic, 3.05% Asian, and 0.39% Native American. 37.0% of the district's students were eligible to receive free lunch.

=== Previous school years ===
School Year	Enrollment	Gender Makeup		Racial Makeup				
School Year	Enrollment	Female	Male	Asian	African American	Hispanic	Native American	White
2005-06	2,742	51%	49%	3.06%	12.36%	1.50%	0.33%	82.75%
2004-05	3,272	50%	50%	2.84%	14.88%	1.71%	0.43%	80.13%
2003-04	3,323	50%	50%	2.95%	14.54%	1.93%	0.42%	80.17%
2002-03	3,325	50%	50%	3.07%	14.56%	1.77%	0.48%	80.12%

== Accountability statistics ==
	2006-07	2005-06	2004-05	2003-04	2002-03
District Accreditation Status	Accredited	Accredited	Accredited	Accredited	Accredited
School Performance Classifications
Level 5 (Superior Performing) Schools	5	5	5	5	3
Level 4 (Exemplary) Schools	0	0	0	0	1
Level 3 (Successful) Schools	0	0	0	0	1
Level 2 (Under Performing) Schools	0	0	0	0	0
Level 1 (Low Performing) Schools	0	0	0	0	0
Not Assigned	0	0	0	0	0

== See also ==
- List of school districts in Mississippi
