= 2016 Vale by-election =

← Apr. 2016	19 October 2016	2020 →

Vale district
- Registered: 5,149
- Turnout: 33.59%
Deputy before election
Dave Jones
Elected Deputy
Neil Inder

The 2016 Vale by-election was held in the States of Guernsey district of Vale on 19 October 2016 following the death of deputy Dave Jones in July 2016. Nominations closed on 23 September. Neil Inder was elected as the new deputy.

== Result ==
2016 Vale by-election
Party	Candidate	Votes	%
Independent	Neil Inder	685	39.7%
Independent	Garry Collins	560	32.5%
Independent	Rick Lowe	317	18.4%
Independent	Simon De La Mare	143	8.3%
Majority		125	7.2%
Turnout		1,724	33.59%
Registered electors		5,149	
