= Shea Kerry =

American writer and producer

Shea Kerry is an American writer and producer. He played the role of Steve in the thriller Dark Honeymoon (2008), starring Roy Scheider, Eric Roberts, Steve Wilder, and Daryl Hannah.

Shea Kerry was also one of the producers for Dark Honeymoon (2008).

== Early years ==
Shea Kerry was born in Lawton, Oklahoma at the Army hospital in Fort Sill. He moved with his father's military postings to Virginia, Georgia, Alabama, and Florida until his family settled on the Gulf Coast in Long Beach, Mississippi.

His father is a veteran of the Cuban Missile Crisis in October 1962, best portrayed in the film, Thirteen Days (2000).

Kerry was a child model at 4 years old when he was scouted by a fashion photographer taking family photos at a local mall. Kerry became a professional actor at 12 doing local television commercials and theater. He starred in the productions of Oliver, South Pacific, One Foot in Heaven, Cinderella.

Kerry adapted and directed an original one man stage drama titled Renfield from Bram Stoker's Dracula. Kerry appeared in this production at the Mississippi State Competition for Best Drama. He was encouraged by his drama coach and mentor Chuck Lembright, his dance partner Stacie MacDonald, and his sister Catherine to move to Los Angeles to enter the film industry.

Kerry moved to Los Angeles at age 17.

== Los Angeles history ==
Shea Kerry was accepted as an actor and a choreographer of the teen ensemble, American Youth on Stage, which produced fashion and theatrical shows throughout Los Angeles. His mentors and creators of the group were Ed Diamond and Lance Lenon, both long-time performers from the national circuit. Diamond and Lenon guided Kerry's early career, and at age 18 they assigned Kerry as the manager and talent coordinator of their company, New Concept Casting which provided talent for Columbia Pictures which produced The Discovery Project. One of those films won the Academy Award for Best Short Film.

Kerry continued his professional career with acting and directing in the touring company of A Christmas Carol and by appearing in the film Norma Jean & Marilyn (1996) starring Ashley Judd. Kerry was the choreographer and one of the producers for the Angel Awards in the Embassy Room of the Ambassador Hotel, the site of the assassination of Robert F. Kennedy on June 4, 1968.

"We changed into our costumes in the cramped and dingy pantry, and those of us who knew its sad legacy were silent", Kerry said.

Kerry continued to teach ballroom dancing to the children of The United Way and The Leukemia Society which gave him the DJ of the Year Award.

Kerry appeared on the situation comedy, with Michael J. Fox and in the Robert Carradine film, Number One with a Bullet (1987) with Billy Dee Williams. Kerry said ten years later, "I was playing an assault trooper with a big heavy gun, and I was so excited to be working with Robert Carradine that I wanted to really give it my all. When the director called action, I ran full out down the wet grassy hill with the heavy gun, and I immediately fell on my face, sliding all the way down the hill to come to a stop right in front of the camera and the entire crew. The director yelled, "Cut! What was that?"

"I had ripped out both knees of my uniform so I was sent back to wardrobe as they re-set the scene to shoot what I had just destroyed. I kept wondering why the make-up crew were all smiling at me as they bandaged my knees and trashed my costume. Then they gave me the note that said I was done for the day. I had really wanted to meet Robert and impress him with my superb acting ability. I never got to meet him, but I'm sure he enjoyed my slide."

Another of Kerry's memorable acting roles was his scene with Tracey Ullman on her television variety show, The Tracey Ullman Show (1987). The show was broadcast live, and the sustained laughter from the audience reaction to the scene caused Kerry's fellow actor to sit in the wrong chair at the wrong time. The cameras rolled on while Kerry, Tracey, and the other actors adjusted their positions and completed the scene. "It was the longest pause for laughter in my entire stage career. Tracy almost sat on the actor's lap as he tried to get out of her way. The audience wouldn't stop laughing. Tracy Ullman is the best comic actress I've ever worked with", Kerry said later.

Kerry appeared in the compelling and award-winning film Remnants of Auric Healing (2004) about a school teacher driven by desperation to confront the obsessions that were destroying his life.

== Hurricane Katrina ==
Kerry returned to his hometown of Long Beach, Mississippi on the Gulf Coast in August 2005 to search for his father who was injured and missing in Hurricane Katrina. "The entire Gulf Coast had been washed away, all of it", said Kerry.

Kerry was reunited with his father at the Veteran's Hospital in Biloxi, Mississippi. Kerry helped with the Katrina disaster relief after visiting his father and is now writing a book titled Finding My Father from his experiences on the devastated Gulf Coast. Kerry returned to Los Angeles with a film record of the Gulf Coast residents made homeless, the National Guard troops protecting them, and the miles of destroyed houses and casinos. This will be broadcast in a documentary in 2007.

"I filmed a line of police cars from Pensacola that was so long I felt it might stretch all the way back to Florida," he said. "We stood quietly and watched them pass, as one mourns a funeral train, but instead of sadness it gave us the feeling that life would get better."

== Recent films ==
Shea Kerry was one of the producers for the motion picture Love is the Drug (2006) from the acclaimed screenwriter Wesley Strick, which starred Daryl Hannah and Lizzy Caplan. Kerry represented the film as one of the producers at the 2006 Slamdance competition screening alongside the Sundance Film Festival in Park City, Utah.

Kerry appeared with Sean Penn in the Academy Award-winning film, MILK (2008).

Shea Kerry will produce "The Prodigal Son" from his original screenplay, to be followed by "The Vampires of New Orleans" filmed on location in Louisiana.
