= La Grande Mare =

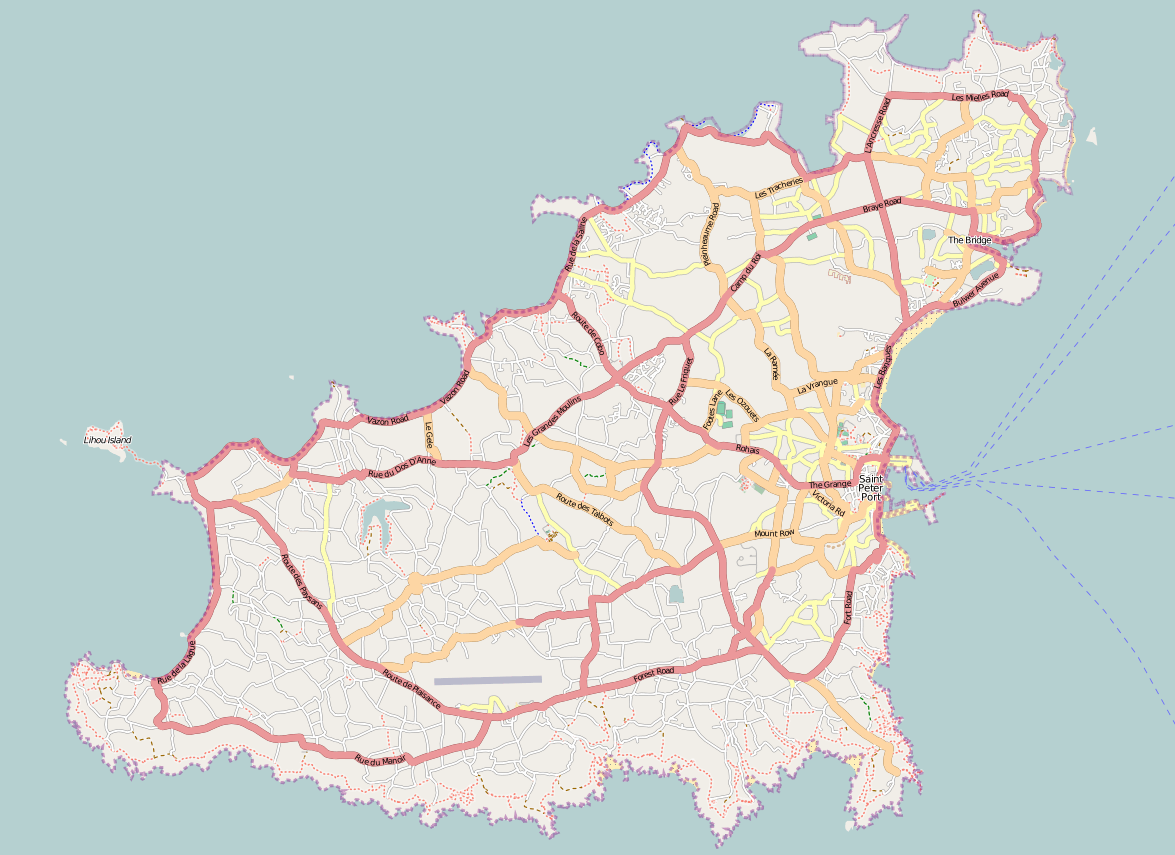
- Location in Guernsey

General information
- Location: Vazon Bay, Guernsey
- Coordinates: 49°28′4″N 2°36′44″W

Website
- www.lagrandemare.com

La Grande Mare Hotel Golf & Country Club is a hotel and golf course in Vazon Bay, Castel, Guernsey. The house, set in 120 acres, contains 12 suites, 12 double rooms and 10 self-catering units.
