= National Trust of Guernsey =

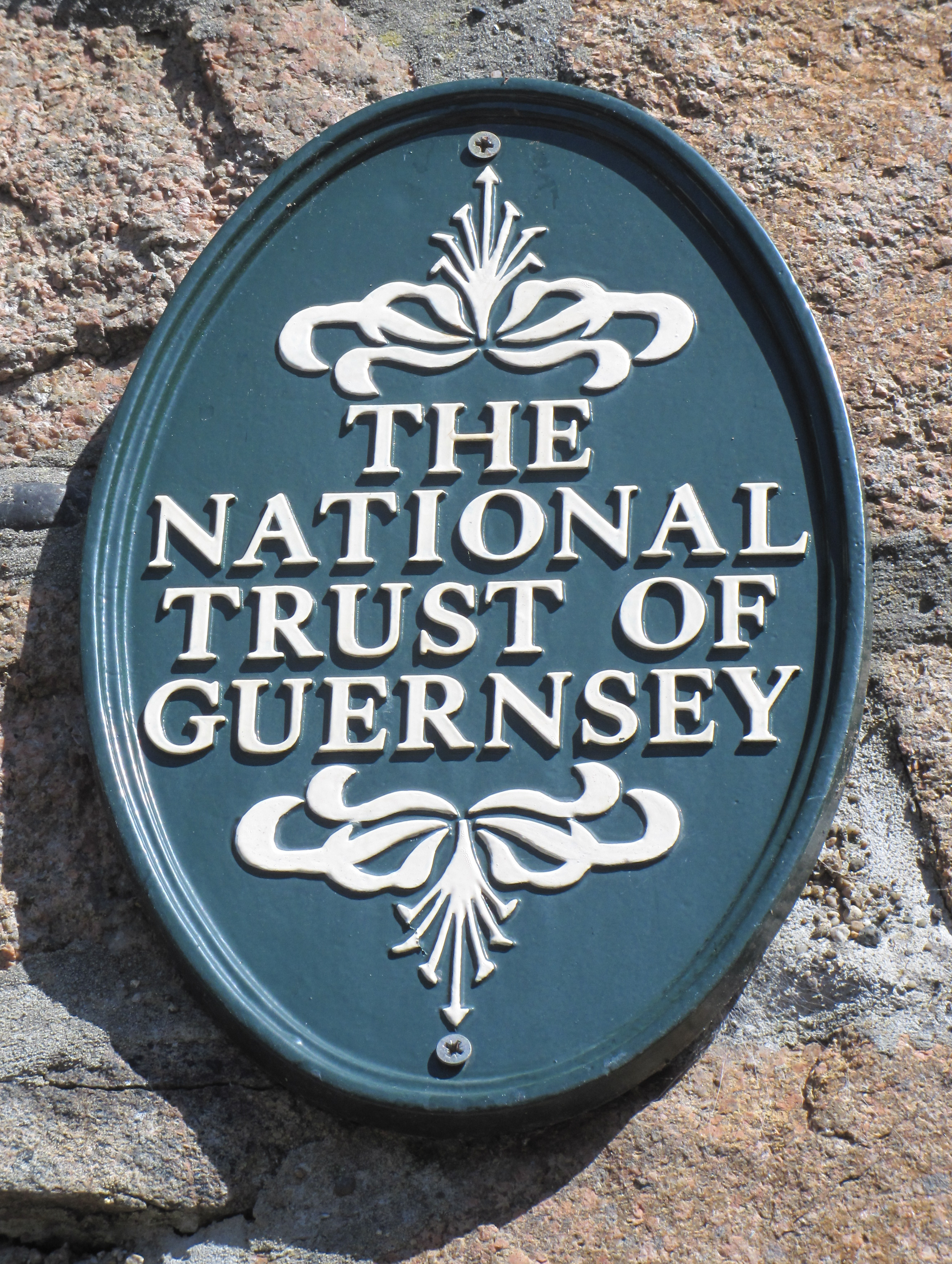
National Trust of Guernsey

The National Trust of Guernsey is an association that preserves and enhances historic buildings and the heritage of the Bailiwick of Guernsey. Founded in 1960, the association became The National Trust of Guernsey in 1967.

In 1968, the Trust, as part of a joint venture with La Societe Guernesiaise, established the Guernsey Folk Museum in Saumarez Park. The site had previously been home to a display of an old Guernsey kitchen setup as part of the 1951 Festival of Britain. The museum has expanded to become the Folk & Costume Museum, which is now overseen by the Trust. The museum describes the everyday lives of the people of Guernsey over the last 250 years through a selection of objects and costumes.

The Trust headquarters is at 26 Cornet Street, which may be the earliest remaining complete building within Saint Peter Port's medieval boundaries. Since 1987, the property has housed a Victorian shop and parlour that offers traditional sweets and gifts.

Since 2009 the Trust has opened up an old Guernsey farmhouse at Les Caches Farm that was restored to the 1800s era. The building now houses information detailing the restoration process and an event space for public and private functions.

The Trust holds large number of properties across Guernsey, ranging from traditional buildings to areas of natural beauty along the island's south coast cliffs. The National Trust of Guernsey currently has over 2,000 members.

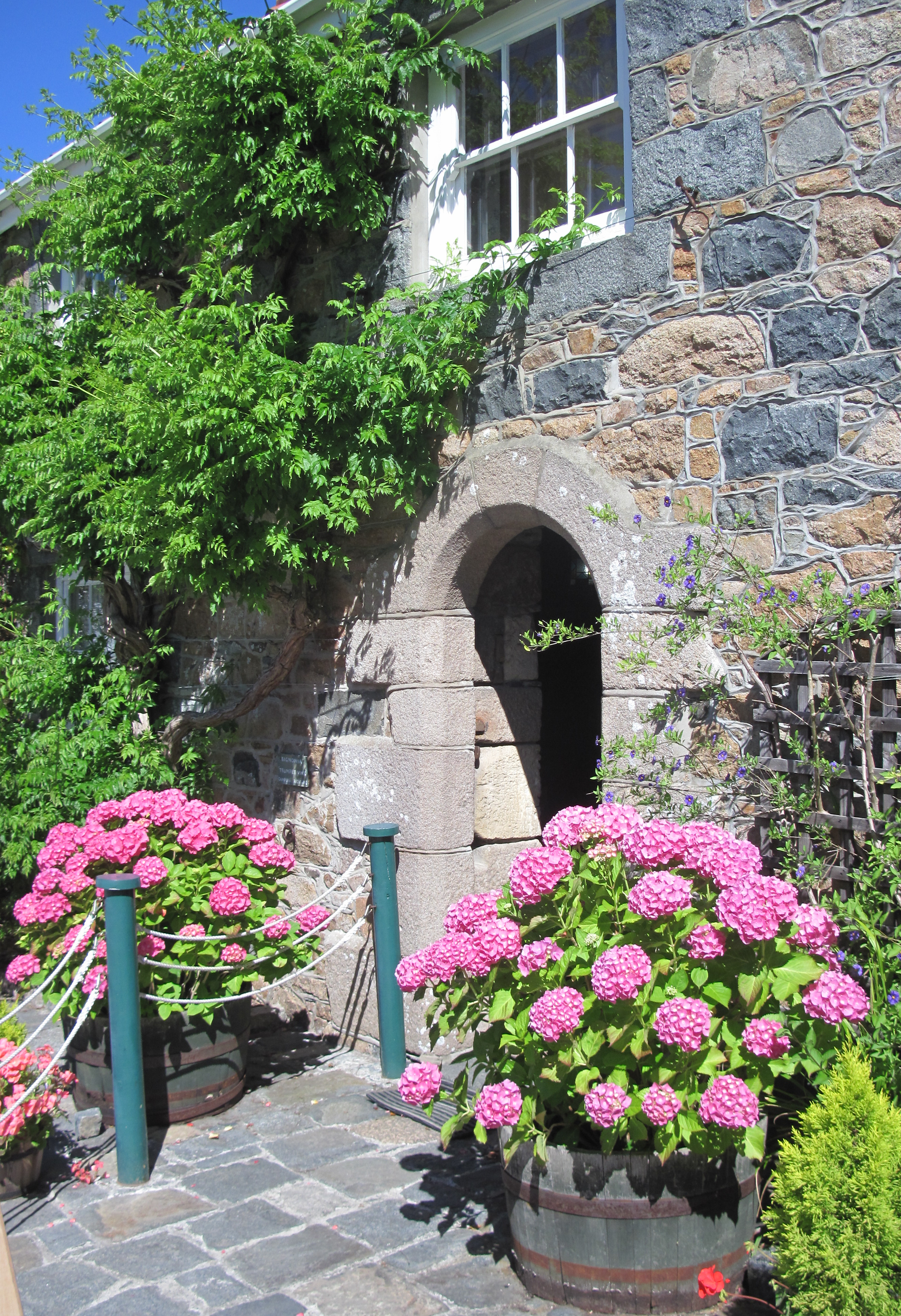
The National Trust of Guernsey Folk & Costume Museum

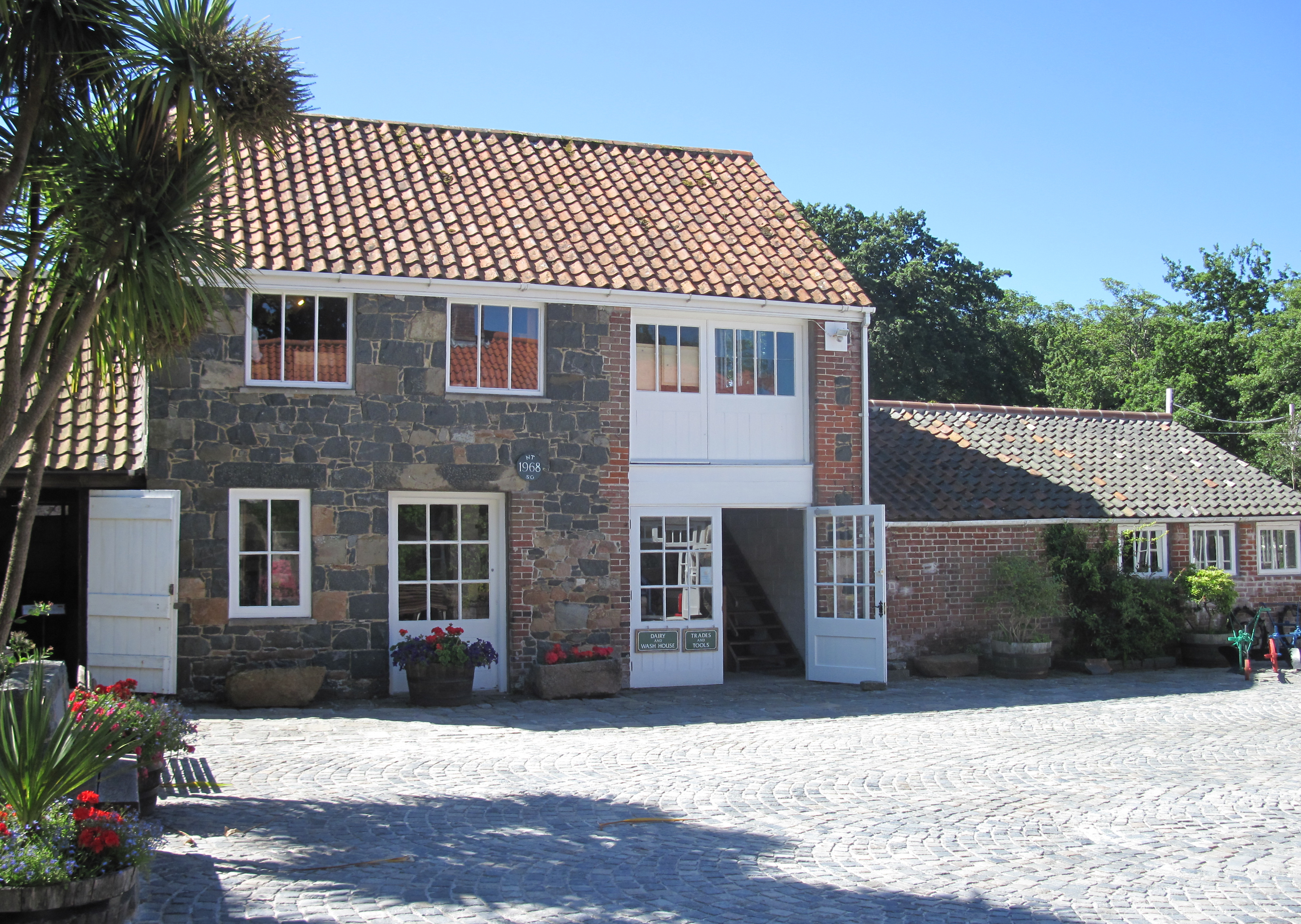
Dairy and Wash house, Trades and tools

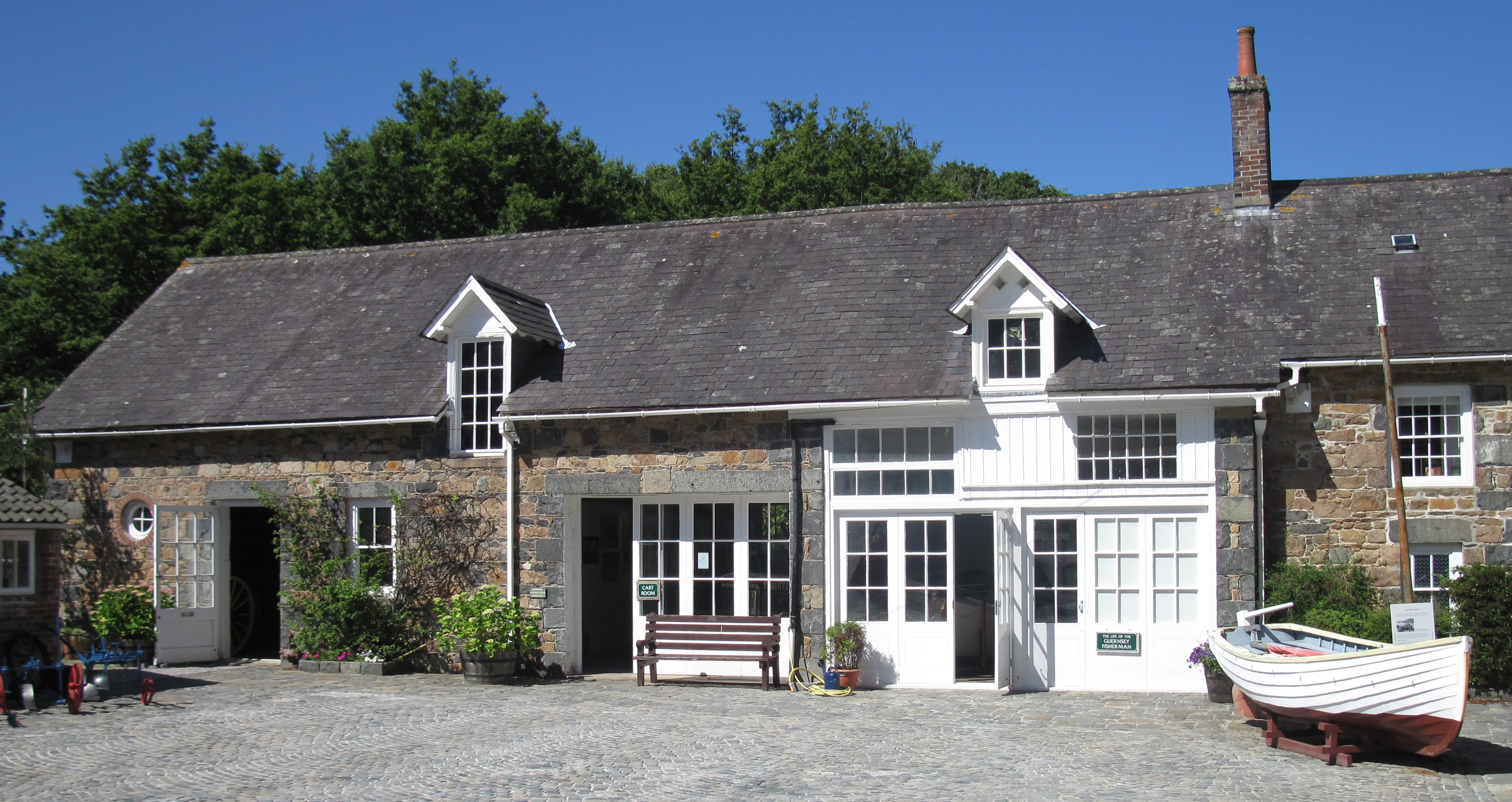
The life of the Guernsey fisherman

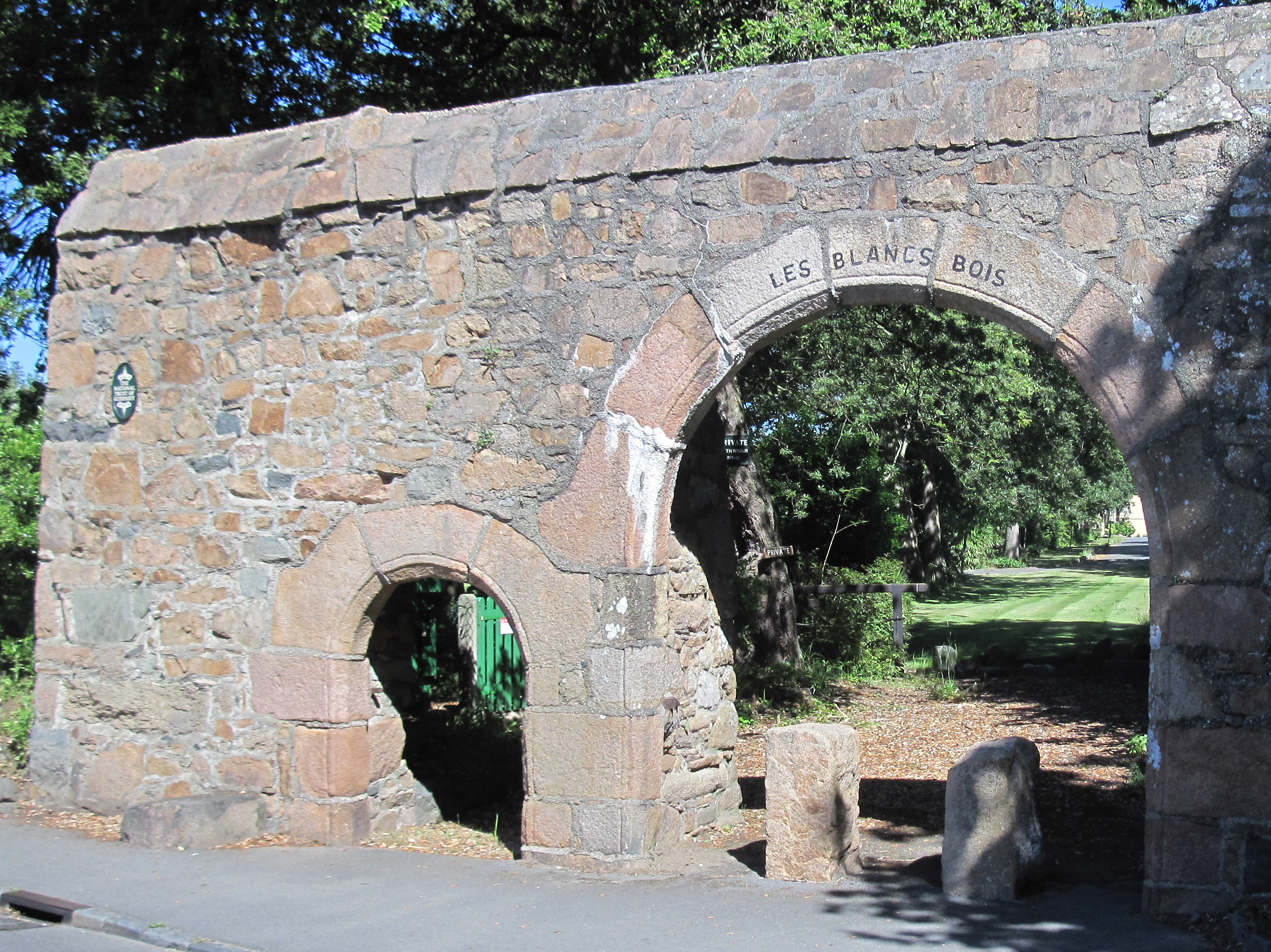
Les Blancs Bois arch - a National Trust of Guernsey property

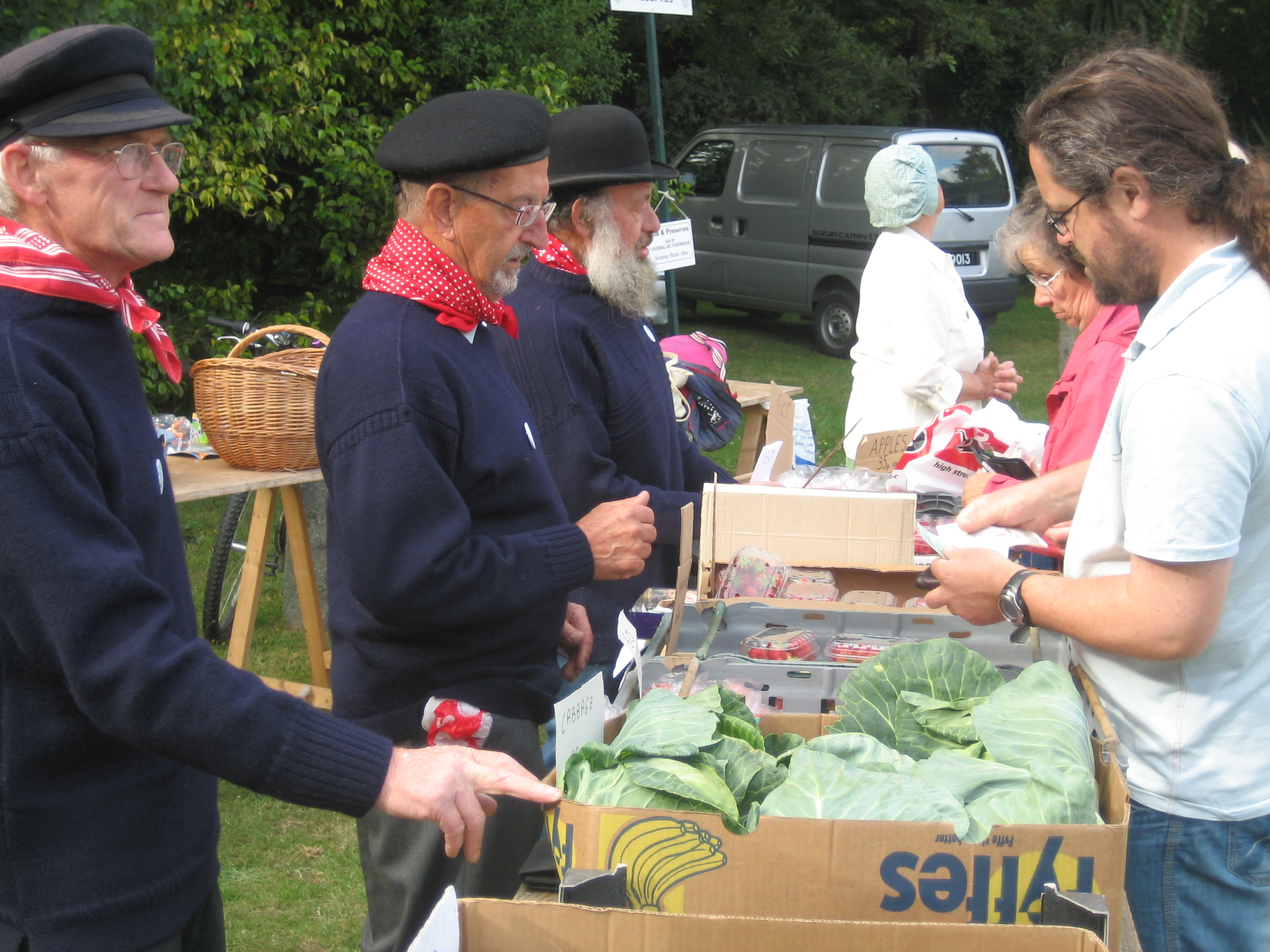
The National Trust of Guernsey organises the annual Viaër Marchi
