= Castel, Guernsey =

Parish in central Guernsey

Castel
- Parish
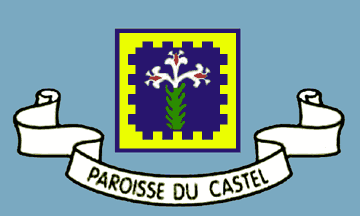
- Flag

- Location of Castel in Guernsey
- Coordinates: 49.474°N 2.603°W
- Crown Dependency: Guernsey, Channel Islands

Government
  - Electoral district: Castel

Area
  - Total: 10.1 km^{2} (3.9 sq mi)
  - Rank: Ranked 1st

Population (2019)
  - Total: 8,795
  - Density: 871/km^{2} (2,260/sq mi)
- Time zone: GMT
  - Summer (DST): UTC+01
- Website: www.castelparish.com

Castel /kætel/ (Guernésiais: Lé Casté; French: Sainte-Marie-du-Câtel) is the largest parish in Guernsey in terms of area.

The parish has clear evidence of changes in ancient sea-levels, with trunks of an oak forest visible on Vazon beach at very low tide and at 8 m (26 ft) above sea level an ancient beach.

The old Guernésiais nickname for people from Castel was ânes pur sàng.

The parish plays host to both Le Viaër Marchi and the North Show which includes the Battle of Flowers annually. It also produces a regular magazine called Castel Matters.

The postal code for street addresses in this parish begins with GY5.

== Parish church ==
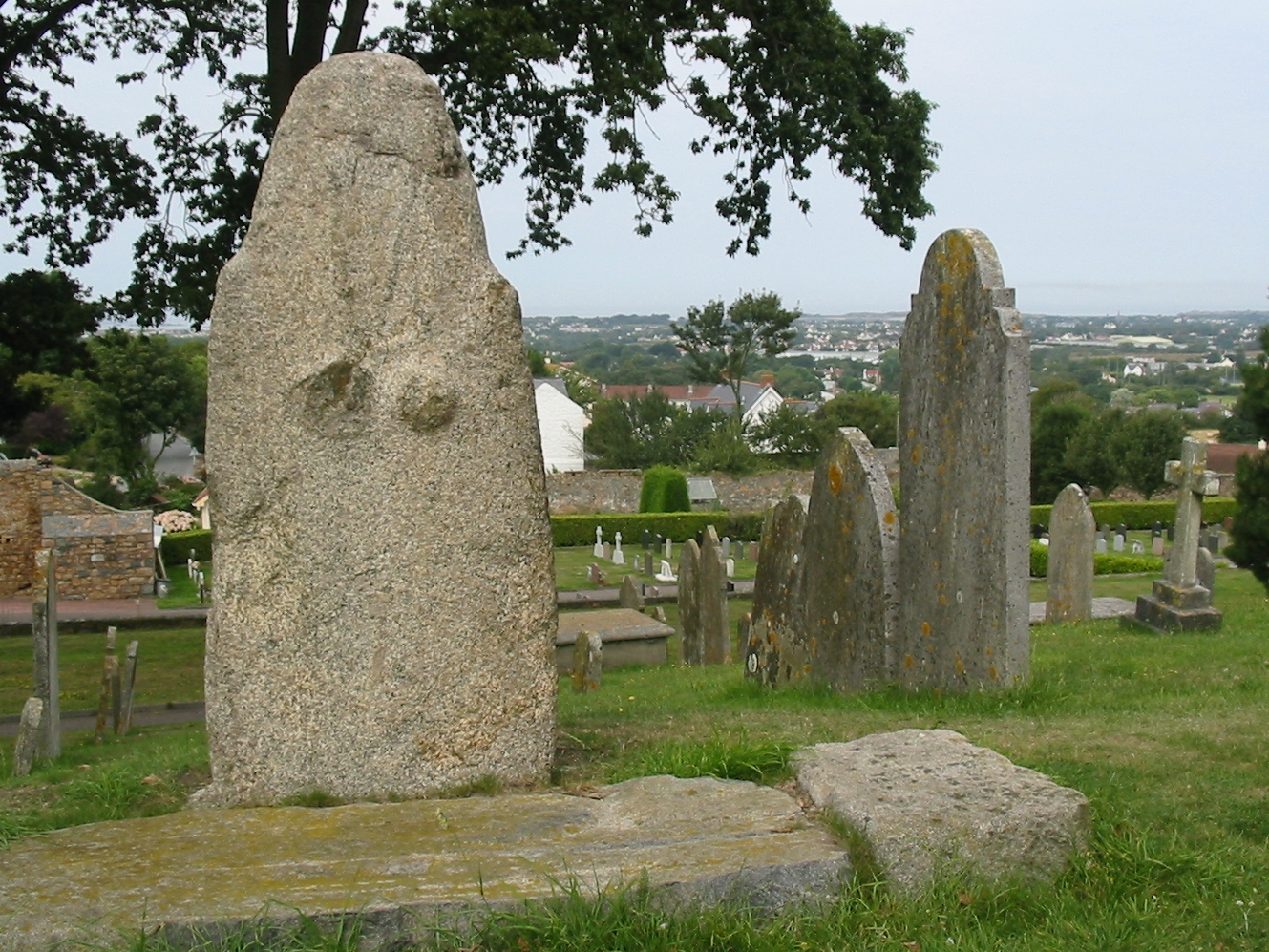
The statue menhir overlooks the Bas Pas

The parish church of St Marie de Castel, also known as Notre Dame de la Délivrance, was consecrated on 25 August 1203. It is notable for its preserved medieval fresco.

A pre-Christian neolithic menhir dating from 2,500-1,800 BC in the churchyard, carved to represent a female, with breasts and a necklace in relief, is possibly a fertility symbol. It was discovered under the floor of the church in 1878, possibly buried there to rid the church of a link to the older pagan beliefs.

In the churchyard is the tomb of James Saumarez, 1st Baron de Saumarez GCB, an admiral of the British Royal Navy.

The church is thought to be built on an ancient fort, hence the name Castel or Câtel, possibly a corruption of the Roman Castellum or castrum. Broken Roman roof tiles and pottery have been discovered in the area, indicating Roman occupation.

== Features ==
Features of the parish include:

- Ste. Marie de Castel church
- Saumarez Park
- National Trust of Guernsey Folk & Costume Museum
- Fairfield
- Military:
  - Parish war memorial inside church
  - Tower 12, Vazon Bay
  - Hougue Batteries Left & Right dating from the Napoleonic Wars
  - Grandes Rocques Battery dating from the Napoleonic Wars
  - Burton Battery dating from the Napoleonic Wars
  - Le Guet watchhouse
  - Fort Hommet, at Vazon
  - Fort Hommet 10.5 cm Coastal Defence Gun Casement Bunker at Vazon
  - German fortifications, built during the occupation 1940-45
- Archaeology:
  - Castel Church Statue Menhir
- Beaches
  - Cobo
  - Grandes Rocques (Saline) (MCS recommended)
  - Port Soif (MCS recommended)
  - Vazon (MCS recommended)
  - Albecq
- Nature reserves
  - Fort Hommet
  - Port Soif/Portinfer
  - Rue de Bergers
- Le Guet
- Cobo village
- Kings Mills village
- Fauxquets Valley
- Talbot Valley
- A number of protected buildings
- Abreuvoirs (places for cattle to drink)

The parish of the Castel hosts:

- La Chambre de la Douzaine
- Castel School, a primary school
- La Mare de Carteret School
- Les Beaucamps High School
- Cobo community centre
- La Grande Mare golf course
- King George V Playing Fields
- Guernsey Indoor Bowls Centre
- King George VII Hospital
- Guernsey Rovers AC ground
- Battle of Flowers, an annual event
- Le Viaër Marchi, an annual community event
- Numerous hotels and restaurants
- Surf school at Vazon
- Country walks

== Politics ==
The Castel comprised the whole of the Castel administrative division, until the 2018 referendum implemented a single constituency.

In 2001, a by-election was held to replace incumbent deputy David John Nussbaumer after he resigned due to other time commitments and his frustration with the current government. The by-election was won by medical doctor Hunter Adam with 27.51% of the vote.

In the 2016 Guernsey general election there was 3,262 or 73%, turnout to elect five Deputies. Those elected (in order of votes received) being Richard Graham, Chris Green, Barry Paint, Mark Dorey and Jonathan Le Tocq.
