= Long Beach High School (Mississippi) =

Location
- 300 East Old Pass Rd; Long Beach, Harrison, Mississippi 39560; United States; 30.356°N 89.147°W

Information
- Funding type: public
- Opened: 1957
- Status: open
- School district: Long Beach School District
- CEEB code: 251635
- NCES School ID: 280267000520
- Principal: Brian Rolison
- Teaching staff: 60.69 (FTE)
- Grades: 9–12
- Gender: coed
- Enrollment: 934 (2023–2024)
- Student to teacher ratio: 15.39
- Colors: Maroon and white
- Slogan: Go Bearcats!
- Mascot: Bearcat
- Team name: Long Beach Bearcats
- Website: lbhs.lbsdk12.com

Long Beach High School, also known as Long Beach Senior High School, is a suburban public high school located in Long Beach, Mississippi, United States. It is in the Long Beach School District. The school was selected as a National Blue Ribbon School in 2007. The school has been ranked as an A school through Mississippi Department of Education's school report card program since the 2022-2023 school year.

The school's mascot is the Bearcat and its team colors are maroon and white.

== Notable alumni ==
- Sebastian Mink
- Ann Mink
- Alexander Mink
- Mason Mullins
- George Bass
- Richard Bennett
- Richie Brown

== Extracurricular activities ==
Sports teams include baseball, American football, basketball, golf, cross-country, volleyball, tennis, soccer, slow pitch softball, fast pitch softball, band, track and field, swimming and cheerleading.

== Honors ==
=== Academics ===
- Teams from Long Beach High School took first place in the four-state regional ocean sciences bowl at The University of Southern Mississippi Gulf Coast Research Laboratory (GCRL) in 2008 and 2009.

=== Sports ===
- Boys' Soccer - State Champions 2021-2024, South State Champions 2018-2024
- Volleyball – State Champions 2010-11
