= La Mare de Carteret High School =

Location
- Rue Du Galaad; Castel, Guernsey, GY5 7FL
- Coordinates: 49.4799°N 2.5813°W

Information
- Closed: September 2025
- Head teacher: Mark Ramsay (Interim Head of School)
- Colours: Black, Sky Blue, Maroon
- Website: http://www.lamarehigh.com

La Mare de Carteret High School was a high school on the island of Guernsey in the Channel Islands, located in the Castel parish. The school is expected closed in 2025 due its rebuilding costs and had stopped accepting Year 7 pupils, since September 2023. Students will attend Les Varendes High School instead.

In February 2016, the school received a validation report from Education Scotland, where it was rated as "very good" in all but one quality indicator. This is in contrast to the deficient performance of the school in earlier years, prior to the ex-head teacher's retirement in 2012. Students have asserted challenges they face in comparison to other regional schools and pushed back against its merger with Les Varendes High School for sixth form, citing lack of sufficient facilities and the decaying structure of the building as two main concerns.

== History ==
When the new academic year started in September 2009, the last remaining students of St. Peter Port Secondary school beginning their GCSEs were transferred to La Mare de Carteret High School. Joining students in their transfer was Ken Wheeler, prior headteacher at St. Peter Port, who replaced Phillip White as the headteacher of La Mare in September 2009.

In February 2012, Ken Wheeler retired from his position as headteacher after increased pressure concerning unsatisfactory GCSE standards at the school, however a spokeswoman for the school asserted that his decision was due to health problems. Geoff Cowley, initially brought in as School Improvement Partner while the school was under review by the Guernsey education board, became Interim Headmaster following the leave of Ken Wheeler. In April 2012, Vicky Godley was appointed head of the school and served at La Mare until September 2020.

== Pathways ==
Students from La Mare de Carteret can choose to continue learning at the Guernsey College of Further Education or the Sixth Form Centre when they leave school.

== Notable alumni ==
- Matt Le Tissier, an England footballer
