= Parishes of Guernsey =

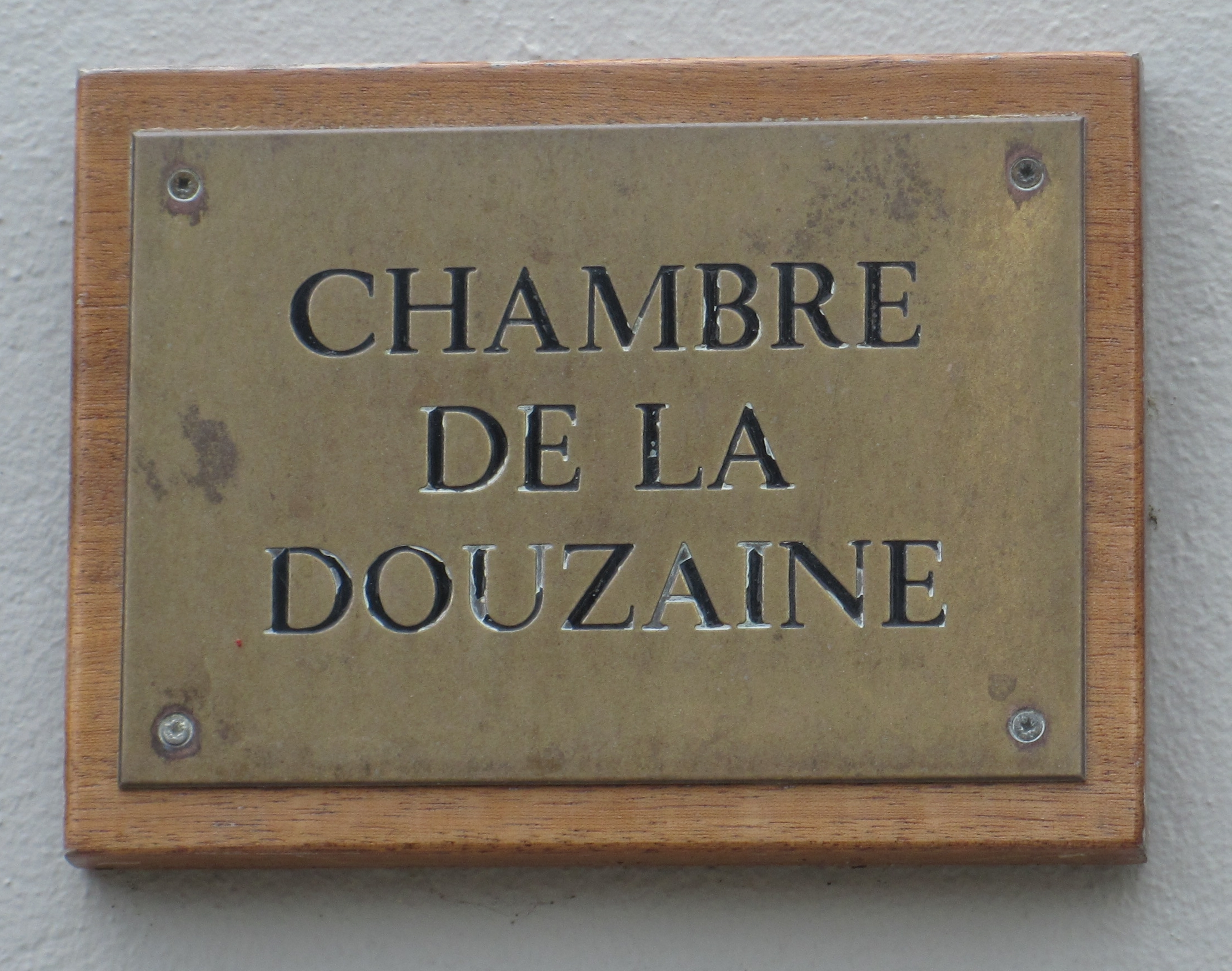
"Chambre de la Douzaine" – sign of the Douzaine Room of the parish of Torteval.

The parishes of Guernsey are the ten civil parishes of the Bailiwick of Guernsey in the Channel Islands. They are based on ancient ecclesiastical parishes, each with its own parish church from which they get their names. They are the main administrative divisions of Guernsey, and are governed by an elected council known as a Douzaine.

== Parishes ==
Below are the ten parishes of the Bailiwick of Guernsey. The parishes of Saint Anne, Alderney and Saint Peter, Sark are non-administrative and thus are not generally included in the enumeration of parishes. Both these islands are instead administrated by their own respective autonomous legislature.

The parishes of Guernsey

Parish	Population (2019)	Area		
Parish	Population (2019)	(vergées)	(km^{2})	(sq mi)
Castel	8,795	6,224	10.200	3.938
Forest	1,546	2,508	4.110	1.587
St Andrew	2,295	2,752	4.510	1.741
St Martin	6,593	4,479	7.340	2.834
St Peter Port	18,958	4,074	6.677	2.578
St Pierre du Bois	2,036	3,818	6.257	2.416
St Sampson	8,966	3,687	6.042	2.333
St Saviour	2,765	3,892	6.378	2.463
Torteval	1,017	1,901	3.115	1.203
Vale	9,514	5,462	8.951	3.456
St Anne, Alderney^{n}	1,960		7.9	3.1
St Peter, Sark^{n}	400		5.45	2.1

^{n} Non-administrative parishes

The islands of Herm and Jethou form part of the parish of St Peter Port. Lihou falls within the area of St Pierre du Bois.

== History ==
The population of and names of the parish are recorded in The History of the Island of Guernsey in 1814.

Estimated population of the island of Guernsey by parish in 1814
Name in 1814	Modern name	Population about
St Sampson's		788
St Michael in the Vale	Vale	1,064
St Philip of Torteval	Torteval	390
St Saviour		943
St Margaret of the Forest	Forest	443
St Peter of the Wood	St Pierre du Bois	1,200
St Martin		1,265
Our Lady of Deliverance of the Castle (formerly Grand Sarazin)	Castel	1,500
St Andrew		700
St Peter's Port (or Town Parish)		11,000
Sailors and strangers not permanently settled		2,000
Total population		21,293

== Administration ==
Population of Guernsey by parish

Each parish is administered by a council called a Douzaine, made up of Douzeniers who serve four-year terms. Each year in November, one quarter of the Douzeniers are elected by parishioners at a parish meeting. In most parishes there are twelve Douzeniers in total (Douzaine = "twelve") and so three are elected each year; exceptionally, the Vale elects four each year (total 16) and St Peter Port five (total 20). The senior Douzenier is known as the Doyen (Dean). To stand for election the candidate must reside in the parish.

One or more Douzaine representatives represent their parish at the States of Election when a new Jurat is elected.

Two elected Constables (French: Connétables) carry out the decisions of the Douzaine, serving for between one and three years. The longer-serving Constable is known as the Senior Constable and his or her colleague as the Junior Constable. Historically the Constables have been in existence since at least 1481 although their duties have been reduced over the centuries.

Both Douzeniers and Constables can be removed by the Royal Court for failing in their duty.

=== Parish business ===
Amongst the many varied duties:

- Obligation to ensure roadside hedges are trimmed
- Supervise watercourses (douits)
- Administer Parish cemeteries
- Maintain wayside pumps and troughs
- Collecting Parish rates
- Issue dog licence and collect dog tax
- Manage parish boat moorings

Parishes officials also advise the States of Guernsey on matters pertaining to the Parish, such as licensing drinking, entertainment and betting establishments.

== Nicknames ==
Inhabitants of each of the parishes of Guernsey also have traditional nicknames, although these have generally dropped out of use among the English-speaking population. The traditional nicknames are:

Parish	Guernésiais	English translation
St Peter Port	Cllichards	spitters
St Sampson's	Rôines	frogs
Vale	Hann'taons	cockchafers
Castel	Ânes-pur-sàng	pure-blooded-donkeys
St Saviour's	Fouormillaons	ants
St Pierre du Bois	Etcherbaots	beetles
Forest	Bourdons	bumblebees
St Martin's	Cravants	ray fish
St Andrew's	Les croinchaons	the siftings
Torteval	Ânes à pids d'ch'fa	donkeys with horses' hooves

== See also ==
- Parishes of Jersey
