= Blanchelande College =

Location
- Les Vauxbelets; Saint Andrew, GY6 8XY; Guernsey; 49.4422°N 2.5870°W

Information
- Type: Private school
- Motto: Latin: Semper fidelis (Always faithful)
- Religious affiliation: Roman Catholic
- Established: 1902
- Local authority: States of Guernsey
- Oversight: Roman Catholic Diocese of Portsmouth
- Department for Education URN: 132507 Tables
- Principal: Alexa Yeoman
- Gender: Mixed
- Age range: 2–18
- Website: www.blanchelande.co.uk

Blanchelande College is a 2–18 mixed, Roman Catholic, private school and sixth form in Saint Andrew, Guernsey. It was established in 1902 and is located in the Roman Catholic Diocese of Portsmouth. It was the first independent school in Guernsey to become fully mixed.

The Department for Education categorises it as an overseas British school.

== History ==
Blanchelande College was established in 1902 and moved to its present site in Les Vauxbelets in 1999.

In 2011, the school suspended its sixth form provision due to falling numbers and would be reviewed in 2013. In February 2019, it was announced the school would be reopening its sixth form from September 2020 and will offer a range of A-Level courses. The decision to reopen was made due to demand from students and parents, its numbers having risen by more than 20% in the last 18 months, the introduction of boys to the senior school for the first time in September 2015, which made it the only fully mixed independent school in Guernsey at the time, as well as its successful inspection report where it was rated 'excellent' by Independent Schools Inspectorate following its inspection in October 2018.
