= Long Beach, Mississippi =

- City
- Flag Logo
- Nickname: The Friendly City
- Location of Long Beach in Mississippi

- Location in the United States
- Coordinates: 30°21′9″N 89°9′35″W
- Country: United States
- State: Mississippi
- County: Harrison
- Founded Incorporated: August 10, 1905

Government
  - Mayor: Tim Pierce (R)

Area
  - Total: 13.99 sq mi (36.23 km^{2})
  - Land: 10.24 sq mi (26.53 km^{2})
  - Water: 3.75 sq mi (9.70 km^{2})
- Elevation: 26 ft (8 m)

Population (2020)
  - Total: 16,780
  - Density: 1,638.2/sq mi (632.53/km^{2})
- Time zone: UTC−6 (CST)
  - Summer (DST): UTC−5 (CDT)
- ZIP code: 39560
- Area code: 228
- FIPS code: 28-41680
- GNIS feature ID: 0672794
- Website: www.cityoflongbeachms.info

Long Beach is a city located in Harrison County, Mississippi, United States. It is part of the Gulfport-Biloxi metropolitan area. As of the 2020 census, the city had a population of 15,829.

== Geography ==
According to the United States Census Bureau, the city has a total area of 10.4 square miles (26.9 km^{2}), of which 0.39 square miles (1.0 km^{2}), or 3.74% is covered by water.

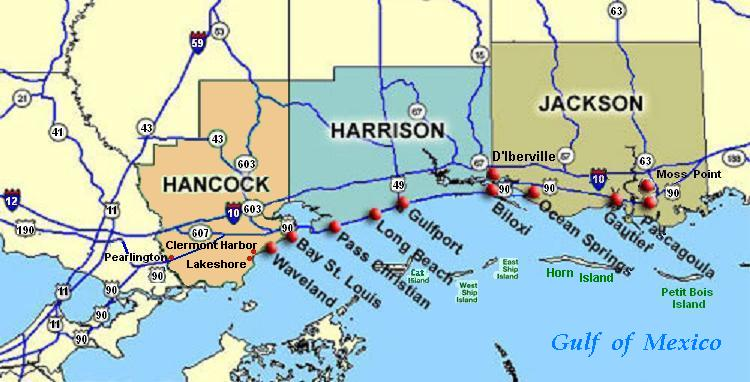
Long Beach (map center) is east of Pass Christian and west of Gulfport, along the Gulf of Mexico

== Demographics ==
Historical population
Census	Pop.	Note	%±
1910	1,026		—
1920	980		−4.5%
1930	1,346		37.3%
1940	1,495		11.1%
1950	2,703		80.8%
1960	4,770		76.5%
1970	6,170		29.4%
1980	14,199		130.1%
1990	15,804		11.3%
2000	17,320		9.6%
2010	14,792		−14.6%
2020	16,780		13.4%
U.S. Decennial Census

=== 2020 census ===
As of the 2020 census, Long Beach had a population of 16,780. The median age was 40.8 years. 22.2% of residents were under the age of 18 and 19.3% were age 65 or older. For every 100 females, there were 89.6 males, and for every 100 females age 18 and over, there were 85.6 males.

99.0% of residents lived in urban areas, while 1.0% lived in rural areas.

There were 6,785 households in Long Beach, including 4,243 families. Of all households, 31.1% had children under age 18 living in them. Married-couple households made up 46.1% of households, while 16.6% had a male householder with no spouse or partner present and 30.8% had a female householder with no spouse or partner present. About 27.0% of households were made up of individuals, and 12.1% had someone living alone age 65 or older.

There were 7,348 housing units, of which 7.7% were vacant. The homeowner vacancy rate was 1.9% and the rental vacancy rate was 7.6%.

Long Beach racial composition as of 2020
Race	Num.	Perc.
White (non-Hispanic)	12,860	76.64%
Black or African American (non-Hispanic)	1,528	9.11%
Native American	52	0.31%
Asian	476	2.84%
Pacific Islander	10	0.06%
Other/mixed	1,005	5.99%
Hispanic or Latino	849	5.06%

== Education ==
The city of Long Beach is served by the Long Beach School District, which operates five campuses and has an enrollment around 2,700 students. These campuses are Long Beach High School, Long Beach Middle School, Reeves Elementary School, Quarles Elementary School, and Harper McCaughan Elementary School, rebuilt in a new location after the previous school was destroyed by Hurricane Katrina.

The University of Southern Mississippi's Gulf Coast campus is located in Long Beach on East Beach Boulevard. Through the 52-acre beachfront campus in Long Beach, Mississippi, USM serves as the only four-year public institution located on the Mississippi Gulf Coast, offering bachelor’s, master’s and doctoral degrees in more than 50 distinct academic fields. The Gulf Park campus is also home to the state’s only bachelor’s degree in ocean engineering and the only film studies pathway offered at a public institution in the state.

== History ==
=== The early 1900s ===
Long Beach began as an agricultural town, based around its radish industry, but on August 10, 1905, Long Beach incorporated and became another city on the Mississippi Gulf Coast. As the years went on, the city moved from its agricultural heritage and moved toward tourism with the beach becoming increasingly popular.

=== "The Radish Capital of the World" ===
Long Beach's early economy was based largely upon radishes. Logging initially drove the local economy, but when the area's virgin yellow pine forests became depleted, row crops were planted on the newly cleared land.

A productive truck farming town in the early 20th century, citizens of Long Beach proclaimed the city to be the "Radish Capital of the World". The city was especially known for its cultivation of the Long Red radish variety, a favorite beer hall staple in the northern US at the time. In 1921, a bumper crop resulted in the shipment of over 300 trainloads of Long Beach's Long Red radishes to northern states.

Eventually, the Long Red radishes for which Long Beach was known fell into disfavor, and the rise of the common button radish caused a dramatic decline in the cultivation of this crop in the area.

=== Hurricane Katrina ===
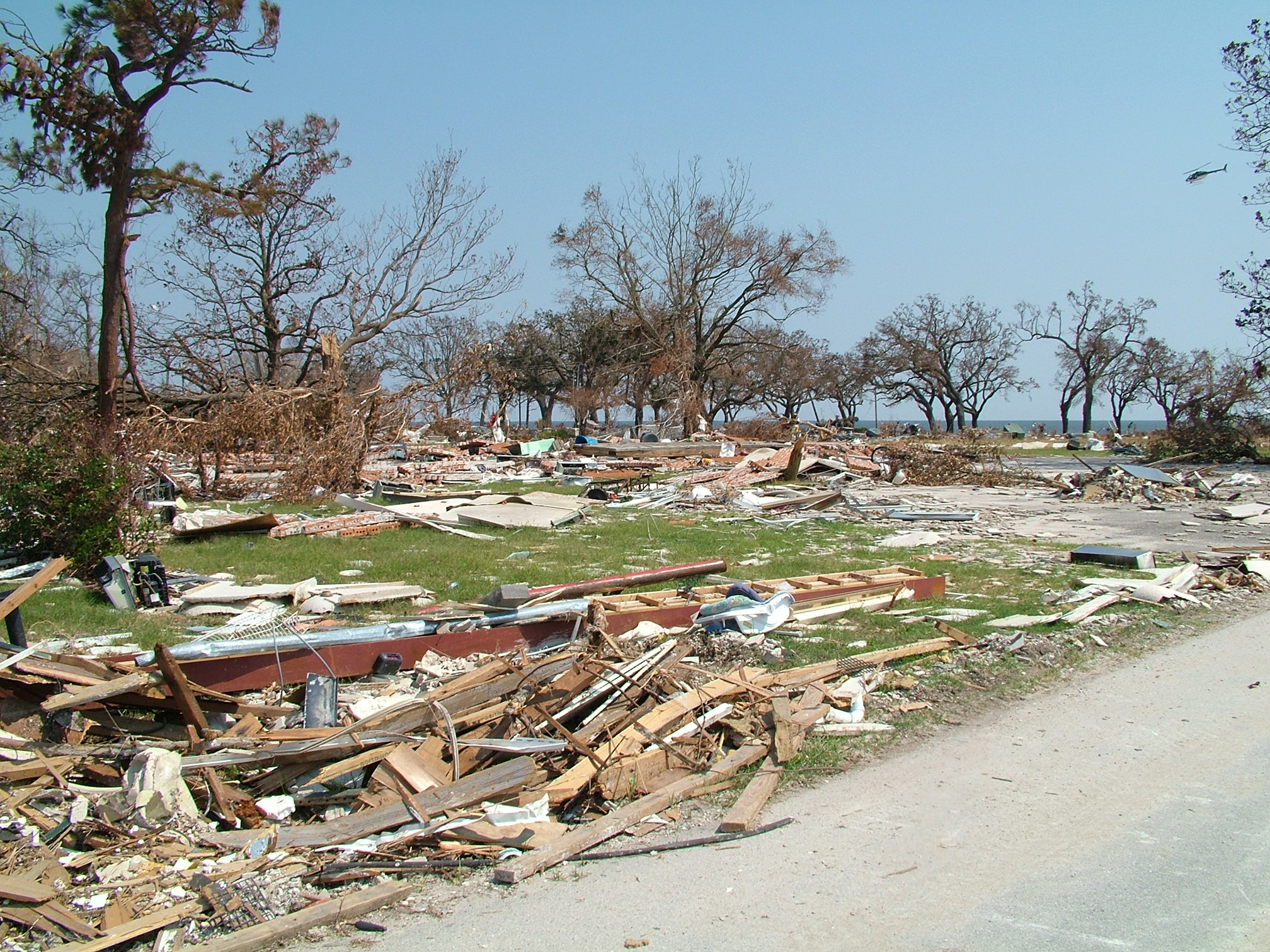
The impact of Hurricane Katrina on the Long Beach shoreline

Hurricane Katrina struck the city on August 29, 2005, destroying almost all buildings within 500 m (1,600 ft) of the Gulf of Mexico shoreline. Many Long Beach residents were left homeless or living in water- and or wind-damaged houses. At least one person was confirmed dead.

The city of Long Beach, California, held a fund raiser to help its eponymous relative. The city of Peoria, Arizona, adopted Long Beach and provided both public and private resources. This resulted in a close relationship between the two communities.

== Today ==
Today, the city is still recovering from Hurricane Katrina. Residents are returning as beaches and condominiums in the area are being repaired, but the city has not seen a return of business to pre-Katrina levels due in part to building codes on the beach established by the Federal Emergency Management Agency and Mississippi Emergency Management Agency and to the economic downturn.

== Notable people ==
- Richard Bennett, member of the Mississippi House of Representatives
- Hale Boggs, former member of the U.S. House of Representatives and House majority leader and a member of the Warren Commission
- Ted N. Branch, retired vice admiral in the United States Navy and former Director of Naval Intelligence
- Myles Brennan, quarterback for the LSU Tigers
- Richie Brown, NFL player
- Nick James, former professional defensive tackle
- Shea Kerry, writer/producer
- Gerald McRaney, film and television actor
