= Les Beaucamps High School =

Coordinates: 49.4626°N 2.5897°W

Les Beaucamps High School 8--
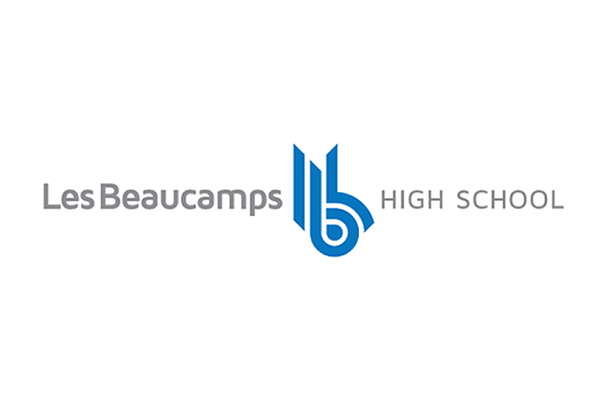

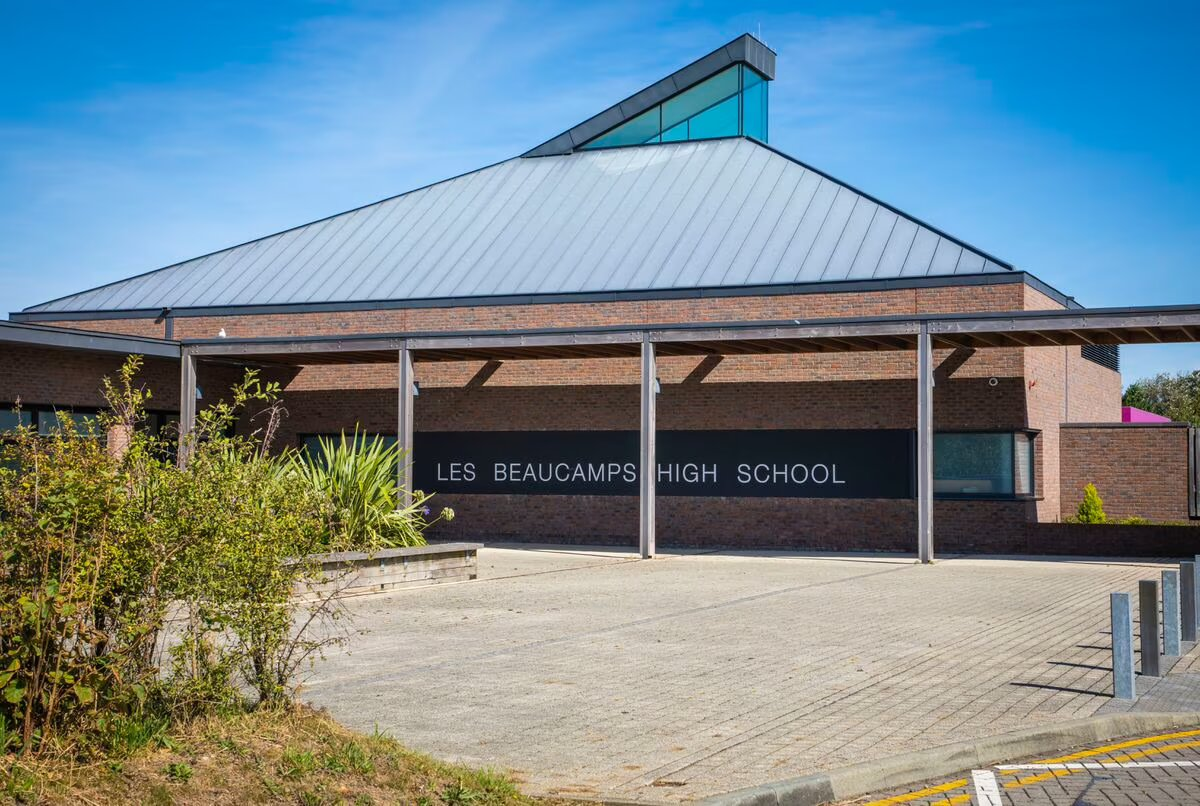

Location
- Ruette des Deslisles, Castel, Guernsey; GY5 7DS

Information
- Former name: Les Beaucamps School
- School type: State
- Established: 1959
- Department for Education URN: 132489 Tables
- Principal: Mr Martin Haimes
- Years taught: 7-11
- Website: https://lbhs.gg

Les Beaucamps High School is a state run 11–16 secondary high school in Guernsey. Its current premises consist of a four-leveled main building completed in 2012 and a separate sports building completed in 2014.

LBHS takes in children from St Martins, Forest, La Houguette, and Castel primary schools.

== House system ==
The school currently has six houses:

- Alderney
- Herm
- Jethou
- Lihou
- Sark
- Brecqhou

These are named after the other islands within the Bailiwick of Guernsey.

== History ==
LBHS was the first of the new 11–16 secondary schools to be constructed in Guernsey. It was first opened in 1959 by Princess Margaret.

In 2010, LBHS was approved for a £37 million rebuild, as it had been operating for almost 60 years, and in the words of a former headteacher, was "on life support".

== Incidents ==
On the 28th of September, 2012, pupils and staff were evacuated when a science experiment went wrong. A cloud formed as a result of an experiment involving copper sulfate. Three pupils and a teacher were checked by paramedics.

On the 9th of December, 2014, a fire ripped through the plant room of the sports building, disrupting a basketball match and prompting evacuation of the building. The sports hall was in repairs until April 27, 2015.

In February 2016, an RS teacher sparked controversy by asking students to write to their parents saying they had converted to Islam and explaining how this bettered their lives. Locals were displeased with this assignment.

In November 2020, a student brought a knife to the site and threatened students on the playing field. Other students were moved away from the threatening student, who later called emergency services on themselves. The pupil was arrested for possession of an offensive weapon and transferred to health professionals once they had exited the school site. Nobody was hurt and the school quickly returned to normal activity.
