= Saint Andrew, Guernsey =

Parish in central Guernsey

St. Andrew
- Parish
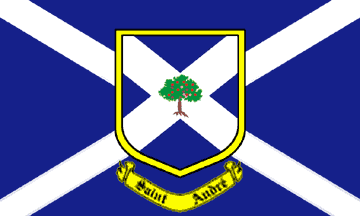
- Flag

- Location of St. Andrew in Guernsey
- Coordinates: 49°26′53″N 2°34′41″W
- Crown Dependency: Guernsey, Channel Islands

Government
  - Electoral district: South East

Area
  - Total: 4.4 km^{2} (1.7 sq mi)

Population (2019)
  - Total: 2,295
  - Density: 520/km^{2} (1,400/sq mi)
- Time zone: GMT
  - Summer (DST): UTC+01
- Website: www.standrews.org.gg

Saint Andrew (Guernésiais: Saint Andri; French: Saint-André-de-la-Pommeraye) is located in the centre of Guernsey and as such is the only parish on the island to be landlocked.

As it is customary to list the parishes round the coast, either clockwise or anti-clockwise, starting with St Peter Port, St Andrew is usually the last parish to be mentioned in such a list. This gave rise to the traditional nickname in Dgèrnésiais of the inhabitants of the parish: les croinchaons (the siftings, what is left behind in the sieve).

== General ==
Saint Andrew is located in the centre of the island and features hills and valleys. It is split into two parts, one bordering St Peter Port and one bordering St Saviour and the Forest. The upper part of the parish where the church and the Little Chapel is situated is very rural. The parish is mainly agricultural, Best's quarry now being used for water storage. St Andrews is the most expensive parish for buying property in Guernsey, closely followed by St Pierre Du Bois and St Saviour. The postal code for street addresses in this parish begins with GY6.

== Features ==
The features of the parish include:

- Churches:
  - Saint Andrew parish church
  - The Monnaie Chapel
  - La Villiaze Church
- The Little Chapel, which is believed to be the world's smallest consecrated church.
- Military:
  - Parish war memorial inside church
  - German Military Underground Hospital
  - German fortifications, built during the occupation 1940-45
- Abreuvoirs (places for cattle to drink)
- A number of protected buildings

The parish of Saint Andrew hosts:

- St Andrew Douzaine
- Princess Elizabeth Hospital
- Les Bourgs Hospice
- Grammar School
- Blanchelande College
- Specsavers Optical Group
- St Andrew water storage reservoir
- Various hotels and restaurants

== Politics ==
St Andrew comprises part of the South East administrative division with St Martin.

In the 2016 Guernsey general election there was a 3,363 or 73% turnout to elect five Deputies. Those elected (in order of votes received) being Heidi Soulsby, Lindsay De Sausmarez, Peter Roffey, Rob Prow and Victoria Oliver.

== Gallery ==
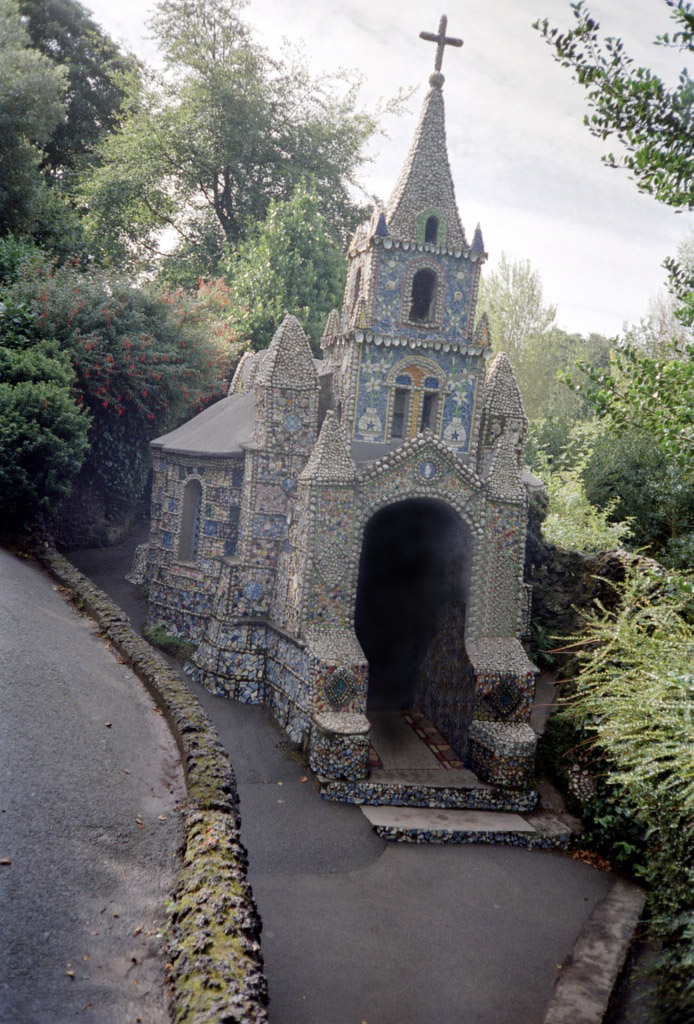
Little Chapel, Guernsey

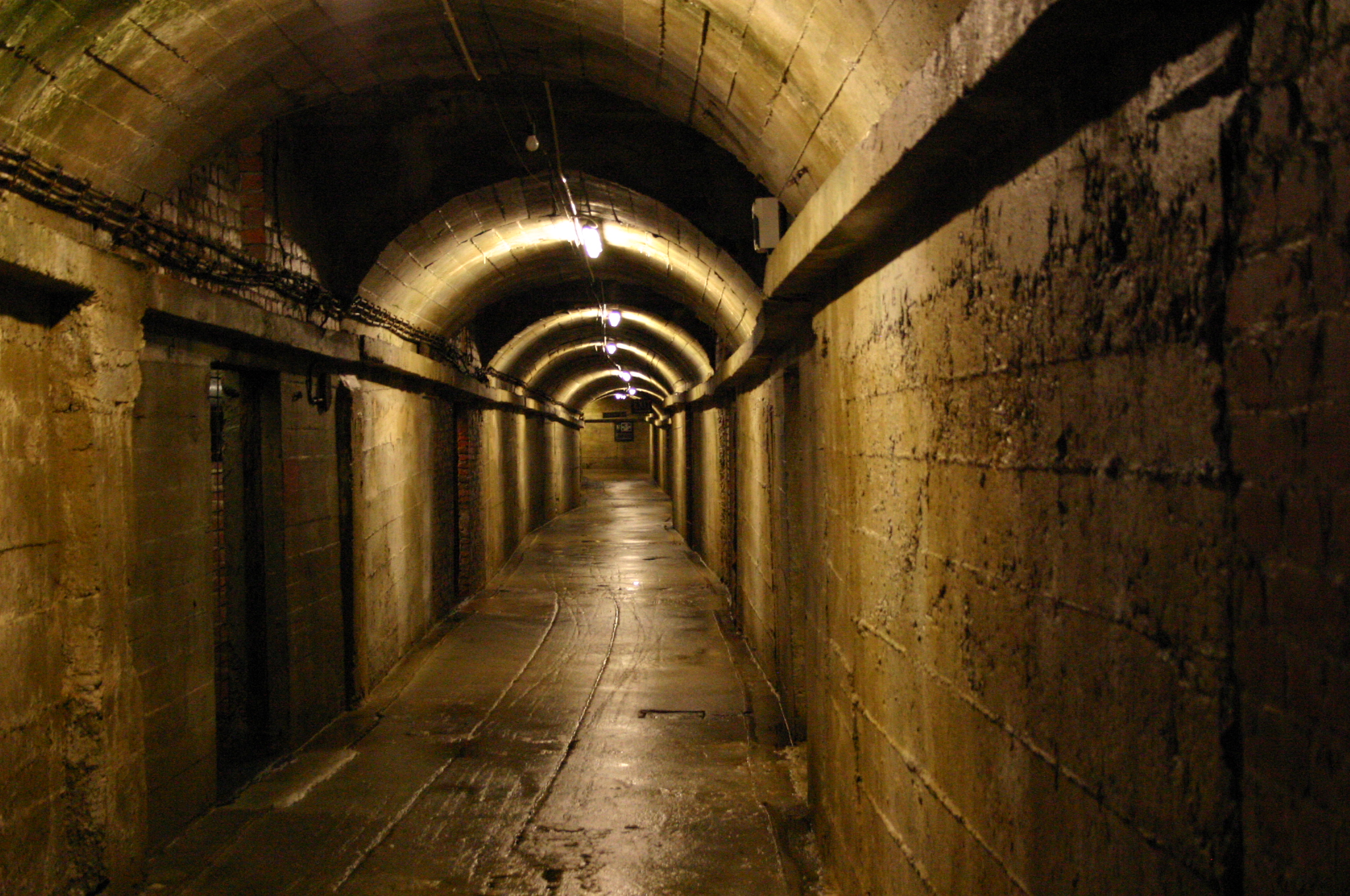
German underground hospital
