= Sarnia Chérie =

Regional anthem of Guernsey

English: Guernsey Dear
- Regional anthem of the Bailiwick of Guernsey
- Lyrics: George Deighton, 1911
- Music: Domenico Santangelo, 1911

Audio sample
- Chord progression of Sarnia Cherie: file; help

"Sarnia Chérie" (English: Guernsey Dear) is used as the unofficial anthem of Guernsey, one of the Channel Islands. Sarnia is a traditional Latin name for the island. George Deighton wrote "Sarnia Cherie" in 1911, with Domenico Santangelo composing the tune later the same year.

The anthem can be heard on a number of occasions each year, such as every 9 May Liberation Day, at Island Games gold medal ceremonies, the annual Viaër Marchi community festival in July, and inter-island sporting events.

== History ==
The song was written in 1911 by George Deighton (1869–1935), who had arrived on the island in 1908 to manage the St. Julian's Theatre. Having liked the island so much, he wrote a poem three years later, which he then asked Domenico Santangelo (1882–1970) to write music for. Santangelo composed a romantic waltz for the lyrics the same year. It was first performed at St. Julian's Theatre (which later became Gaumont Cinema and then an office complex) at a benefit night in November 1911 by Wilfred Shirvell, a local hotelier and friend of Deighton. Santiangelo then had the song published by a French music publisher of his acquaintance Fermo Dante Marchetti.

During the Nazi occupation of the Channel Islands in World War II, the song gained even greater recognition as a local anthem, and it was sung in the later years of the occupation and as British troops liberated the island on 9 May 1945, including by groups of Guernsey evacuees all over the UK, as far as Glasgow. The song remains heavily associated with the wartime experience in Guernsey.

In 2005, the then Chief Minister of Guernsey, Laurie Morgan, called for an updated version of the song, which was abandoned after it met with near-universal opposition.

On 30 June 2009, a CD of 13 renditions of the song was released after an effort spearheaded by local campaigner Roy Sarre, who stated that "it wasn't easy getting copies of Sarnia Cherie". The renditions included an 85-voice choir rendition by the Island Churches Guernsey Festival Chorus, a harmonica rendition by former tomato grower John Bourgaize and a recording from 9 May 1945, when British troops landed in St. Peter Port to liberate the island after five years of German occupation during World War II. The sheet music was also rearranged by Ray Lowe of Sark, owner of the copyright of the music, which he released in September the same year.

In 2012, a Guernésiais version of the song was written by Hazel Tomlinson, a member of the Guernésiais-speaking song and dance group La Guaine du Vouest (English: The Group from the West), which was compiled into a CD of the same name of Guernésiais folk songs with English translations.

== Lyrics ==
English version

I
Sarnia; dear Homeland, Gem of the sea.
Island of beauty, my heart longs for thee.
Thy voice calls me ever, in waking, or sleep,
Till my soul cries with anguish, my eyes ache to weep.
In fancy I see thee, again as of yore,
Thy verdure clad hills and thy wave beaten shore.
Thy rock sheltered bays, ah; of all thou art best,
I'm returning to greet thee, dear island of rest.

Chorus:
Sarnia Cherie. Gem of the sea.
Home of my childhood, my heart longs for thee.
Thy voice calls me ever, forget thee I'll never,
Island of beauty. Sarnia Cherie.

II
I left thee in anger, I knew not thy worth.
Journeyed afar, to the ends of the earth.
Was told of far countries, the heav'n of the bold,
Where the soil gave up diamonds, silver and gold.
The sun always shone, and "race" took no part,
But thy cry always reached me, its pain wrenched my heart.
So I'm coming home, thou of all art the best.
Returning to greet thee, dear island of rest.

𝄆 Chorus 𝄇

Guernésiais version

I
Sarnia, chière patrie, bijou d'la maïr,
Ile plloinne dé biautai, dans d'iaoue si cllaire
Ta vouaix m'appeule terjous, mon tcheur plloin d'envie,
Et mon âme té crie en poine, mes iars voudraient t'veis.
Quaend j'saonge, j'té vaie derchier, mesme comme t'étais d'vànt,
Tes côtis si vaerts et ton sabllaon si bllànc,
Tes bànques et tes rotchets. Ah! Dé toutes la pus belle.
Mon réfuge et mon r'pos, chière île qu'est si belle.

Chorus:
Sarnia Chérie, ma chière patrie,
D'l'île dé ma nèissance, mon tcheur a envie
Ta vouaix m'appeule terjours, et j'pense à té chaque jour.
Ile plloinne dé biautai, Sarnia Chérie.

II
Sàns saver ta valeur, j'm'en fus en colère,
Je v'yagis si llian, à l'aute but dé la terre.
I m'dirent dé biaux pays, et j'm'en fus brâment
Oueque la terre baillait à haut d'l'or et dé l'argent.
Nous 'tait tous amis et i fit bal chaque jeur,
Mais ta vouaix m'applait terjours, a m'déteurtait l'tcheur.
Ch'est pourtchi qué j'm'en vians. Ah! té veis, la millaeure.
Ma chière île dé répos, dé chenna j'sis saeure.

𝄆 Chorus 𝄇

== In popular culture ==
"Sarnia Cherie" was author G. B. Edwards's title for his novel The Book of Ebenezer Le Page on the original typescript he gave to his biographer and future publisher of the book Edward Chaney in 1974, but publishing house Hamish Hamilton decided to use his subtitle when they published it in 1981, choosing, however, to add Deighton's song as an epigraph instead.

== See also ==
- List of British anthems
