= The Book of Ebenezer Le Page =

1981 novel by Gerald Basil Edwards

- First edition cover
- Author: Gerald Basil Edwards
- Cover artist: Paul Leith
- Language: English
- Genre: Autobiographical novel
- Publisher: Hamish Hamilton
- Publication date: 16 March 1981
- Publication place: United Kingdom
- Media type: Print (hardback & paperback)
- Pages: 488 pp (first edition, hardback)
- ISBN: 0-241-10477-7 (first edition, hardback)
- OCLC: 7680723

The Book of Ebenezer Le Page is a novel by Guernsey born writer Gerald Basil Edwards first published in the United Kingdom by Hamish Hamilton in 1981, and in the United States by Alfred A. Knopf in the same year. It has since been published by Penguin Books and New York Review Books in their classics series, as well as in French and Italian.

It is the fictionalised autobiography of an archetypal Guernseyman, Ebenezer Le Page, who lives through the dramatic changes in the island of the Guernsey, Channel Islands from the late nineteenth century, through to the 1960s.

== Plot summary ==
Ebenezer was born in the late nineteenth century and dies some time after the mid 1960s. He lived his whole life in the Vale. He is never married, despite a few flings with local girls, and a tempestuous relationship with Liza Queripel of Pleinmont. He only left the island once, to travel to Jersey to watch the Muratti. For most of his life he was a grower and fisherman, although he also served in the North regiment of the Royal Guernsey Militia (though not outside the island) and did some jobbing work for the States of Guernsey in the latter part of his life. Guernsey is a microcosm of the world as Dublin is to James Joyce and Wessex is to Hardy. After a life fraught with difficulties and full of moving episodes, Ebenezer is ready to die happy, bequeathing his pot of gold and autobiography ("The Book of Ebenezer Le Page") to the young artist he befriends, after an incident in which the latter smashed his greenhouse.

== Characters ==

- Ebenezer Le Page, tomato grower and fisherman
- Alfred Le Page, quarryman, Ebenezer's father, killed in the Boer War
- Charlotte Le Page, Ebenezer's mother, referred to throughout as "my mother"
- Tabitha Le Page ('La Tabby'), Ebenezer's sister
- Jean Batiste, Tabitha's husband, was killed in World War I
- Jim Mahy, Ebenezer's childhood friend, killed in World War I
- Liza Queripel, the love of Ebenezer's life
- William Le Page ('Uncle Willie'), Alfred's brother
- Nathaniel Le Page ('Uncle Nat'), Ebenezer's mother's brother
- Charlotte Le Page, Ebenezer's maternal grandmother
- Henriette Le Page ('La Hetty'), Ebenezer's mother's sister
- Priscille Le Page ('La Prissy'), Ebenezer's mother's sister
- Harold Martel, builder, married Hetty
- Percy Martel, Harold's brother and monumental builder married Prissy
- Raymond Martel, son of Hetty and Harold
- Horace Martel, eldest son of Percy and Prissy
- Cyril Martel, youngest son of Percy and Prissy, died at age 5
- Christine Mahy, wife of Raymond (also the cousin of Jim)
- Abel Martel, son of Raymond and Christine
- Gideon Martel, son of Christine, as a result of an affair with Horace
- Neville Falla, young biker and artist who befriends Ebenezer in his old age
- Cousin Mary Ann, Ebenezer's third cousin (on both sides)

=== Real people mentioned in the book ===
- Adolphus Edward Alfred Carrington (1876~1961), 'manager for John Leale (Leale Ltd.) on the Bridge'.
- Ambrose Sherwill (1890~1968), President of the Controlling Committee during Occupation of the Channel Islands and later Bailiff of Guernsey
- Rev. John ('Jack') Leale (1892~1969), Jurat, President of the Controlling Committee (Oct 1940~Aug 1945) during Occupation of the Channel Islands, knighted 1945
- Arthur Dorey (1867~1953), fruit grower, of Rockmount (Delancey); Ebenezer's boss who makes him a foreman at his vineries off the 'Halfway' (Belgrave, Marais, Springfield, Primrose). Arthur also owns Oatlands Farm with its own large vinery. Arthur was a Jurat and president of the Board of Administration.
- Edward Arthur Dorey (1896~1982), mentioned as the son of the above, going to war in 1914, but unnamed in the book. Fruit grower; later owner of Arthur Dorey & Son, and Douzenier of St. Sampson.
- Philemon Fleure Dorey (1859~1941), 'Mr. Dorey of Oatlands'; fruit grower; brother of Arthur Dorey (above), from whom he was renting Oatlands Farm during Ebenezer's childhood.
- Clarrie Bellot, cobbler
- Steve Picquet, a hermit who lived in a German bunker at Pleinmont
- Frederick William Johns (1871~1957), 'Fred Johns from the Vale Avenue', trustee of St. Sampson's Chapel.
- Douglas Blackburn, 'from the top of Sinclair', of 'Malvern', St Clair Hill, St. Sampson, son of fruit grower Henry J. Blackburn.
- Dr. Josiah Leale (1842~c.1921), L.R.C.P. Edinburgh, M.R.C.S. London, St. Sampson's Parochial Medical Officer, of Vale House, Vale. Surgeon-Lieutenant-Colonel, 2nd Regt R.G.L.I.; resigned his medical rank on appointment as Lieutenant-Colonel Commanding in 1896. In the novel, Dr. Leale diagnoses Jim with appendicitis.

== Major themes ==
1. Life in a close and, in many respects, closed community.
2. Family relationships: falling in and out with one another.
3. Non-sexual but close male friendship.
4. The lifelong, tempestuous love affair, which includes prolonged periods of non-communication, with Liza Queripel. They have much sexual tension between them yet, somehow, seem to agree that sleeping together would make things ordinary. This plays out the truth that many of the most enduring love relationships are those that are never consummated.

== Life ==
Art student Edward Chaney met Edwards in his old age, when he was living a reclusive life near Weymouth in Dorset. Edwards had had a fraught and difficult life. He left Guernsey to study at Bristol University. He then moved to London where he encountered a group of writers, which included his friends John Middleton Murry, J. S. Collis and Stephen Potter. There was an anticipation that he would become the next D. H. Lawrence, and he was in fact commissioned by Jonathan Cape to write Lawrence's biography, before his death.

Instead, he published nothing more than a handful of articles for Murry's Adelphi magazine. He married, had children, divorced (leaving his children to be educated with the Elmhirsts at Dartington Hall) and went through a series of jobs, teaching at Toynbee Hall, working for Mass Observation in Bolton (where he also directed plays at the Little Theatre), as an itinerant drama teacher, a minor civil servant in London, eventually retiring to the West Country. His quarry-owning father had effectively disinherited him where the family home in Guernsey was concerned, by remarrying.

When he met Chaney, he was pouring experience and literary know-how into one last attempt at a major novel. Chaney encouraged Edwards to complete his book, which Edwards then dedicated to him and his wife, giving him the copyright. The immaculate typescript was rejected by many publishers but, eventually, at Hamish Hamilton, Christopher Sinclair-Stevenson accepted it with enthusiasm.

There is a parallel between this real-life story and the story in the novel, in which Ebenezer bequeaths his autobiography (The Book of Ebenezer Le Page) to his young artist friend Neville Falla, the motorcycling rebel with a heart of gold.

== Literary significance and criticism ==
Since its publication in 1981, the book has been critically acclaimed, and has been appreciated by people of Guernsey for its depiction of the local culture.

John Fowles wrote an enthusiastic introduction to the Book, it was very favorably reviewed by William Golding, among several others, and Harold Bloom included it in The Western Canon. Stephen Orgel wrote that it was 'one of the greatest novels of the 20th century'.

Although Penguin let it go out of print, it was reprinted by New York Review Books Classics in 2007. It has meanwhile been published in French and Italian.

== Film, TV or theatrical adaptations ==
It has been adapted for a BBC Radio 4 series, as well as a stage play by Anthony Wilkinson The Islander which premiered at the Theatre Royal, Lincoln in 2002. In both of these adaptations, the role of Ebenezer was played by Guernsey-born actor Roy Dotrice, who also reads the unabridged audiobook of the novel, in an old man's voice and Guernsey accent.

There have been unsuccessful attempts to turn the novel into a film. However, in September 2026 the first successful film adaptation of the novel premiered in Guernsey.

== Release details ==
The book was published by Hamish Hamilton in 1981, followed by Penguin and Knopf in America the following year. It had been the subject of numerous rejections during his lifetime, but attempts to get it published were continued after his death in 1976 by Edward Chaney, who had befriended the author in his old age.

Christopher Sinclair Stevenson asked John Fowles to write an introduction which no doubt helped to draw attention to the publication. The novel was originally intended to form the first part of a trilogy, entitled Sarnia Cherie: The Book of Ebenezer Le Page. Sarnia Cherie refers to the Guernsey anthem, and was retained in the title of the French translation. The other two books were to be called Le Boud'lo: the Book of Philip Le Moigne and La Gran'-mère du Chimquière: the Book of Jean le Féniant. A draft of the second part was destroyed by the author before his death.

For more details of the author, Gerald B Edwards, and how Edward Chaney eventually managed to get his book published, see Chaney's biography Genius Friend: G.B. Edwards and The Book of Ebenezer Le Page.

The work has been translated into French and Italian. The French translation by Janine Hérisson, under the title Sarnia, was published in Paris in 1983 by Maurice Nadeau/Papyrus, with a preface by Nadeau; it was later reissued in paperback by Seuil's Points imprint and, on 6 October 2022, by Monsieur Toussaint Louverture under the title Le Livre d'Ebenezer Le Page. The Italian translation by Franca Pece, Il libro di Ebenezer Le Page, with an afterword by Edward Chaney, was published in Rome by Elliot Edizioni in 2007. An extract from the closing pages of the novel appeared in Russian in 1983, as Kniga Ebinizera Le Pazh (Книга Эбинизера Ле Паж), in Anglia, the Russian-language magazine produced by the British Foreign Office for distribution in the Soviet Union, in an issue that also carried a feature on the Channel Islands.

Cover of US paperback edition, published by Moyer Bell, 2006

== Critical reception ==
- "This extraordinary book" full of "wonderful writing": "To read it is not like reading but living", William Golding. Re Ebenezer himself, Golding wrote: "Nor are simple adjectives adequate... there is epic stature in his individualism". The following December (1981) Golding chose it as his "Book of the Year" in The Sunday Times.
- "The achievement is so intense and universal that the reader is rendered speechless... G.B. Edwards has succeeded in writing a great novel"; Isobel Murray in The Financial Times.
- "A startingly original book", The Times.
- "strong compelling voice, both wily and innocent... it holds the reader in an Ancient Mariner grip throughout this brilliant, unusual, and, a very sadly posthumous novel"; Nina Bawden in The Daily Telegraph.
- "G. B. Edwards, The Book of Ebenezer Le Page. I'd never heard of it. A friend gave it to me. It was written by an 80-year-old recluse on the island of Guernsey, which is where it's set, and it seems to be one of the greatest novels of the 20th century. Really." – Professor Stephen Orgel, Stanford University Department of English: Summer Reading: Top Picks 2004
- "There may have been stranger recent literary events than the book you are about to read, but I rather doubt it", John Fowles in his 1981 Introduction; reprinted in Wormholes (1998).
- "a breathtaking novel": Newsweek.
- A masterpiece....One of the best novels of our time....I know of no description of happiness in modern literature equal to the one that ends this novel. Guy Davenport, The New York Times Book Review.
- Hubert Juin in Le Monde praised the freshness of the style and the literary ambitions of the author, whose aim was to speak rather than to write (Une sorte de miracle tient à l'étrange fraîcheur de l'écriture, sinon à la merveilleuse naïveté de l'écrivain. G.B. Edwards ne songe pas à écrire, il a pour seul impératif de parler).
- In the preface he wrote for his 1983 French edition, Maurice Nadeau (who died in 2013 aged 102), greeted the book as an exceptional achievement
- "Recently reprinted by New York Review Books, G.B. Edwards' novel tells the story of a Guernsey man who lived through the Nazi occupation of Britain's Channel Islands into garrulous old age. His reminiscence is couched in a musical Guernsey English that follows circular paths through past and present to delve into island secrets and sagas. Great stuff." Seattle Times
- "G.B. Edwards's miraculous novel...There is a rare wholeness about The Book of Ebenezer Le Page. You get the entire man, in a way that isn't usually within the gift of literature to procure... I have read few books of such wide and delightful appeal.... [it] is vast fun and vast life, a Kulturgeschichte... It is ‘the book of’ in the prosaic sense that Edwards's character speaks it (or writes it in his three big notebooks bought for 18/6 at ‘the Press Office in Smith Street’ in St Peter Port); but also ‘of’ in the sense of ‘made into’. It is Ebenezer made into a book. (Bohumil Hrabal's Too Loud a Solitude comes to mind, with its paper-baler who is finally baled up himself.) William Golding put it admirably when he said: ‘To read it is not like reading but living.’ It is like reading with no clothes on." (Michael Hofmann, London Review of Books, 24 January 2008, p. 23).
- "Quaint. Fascinating. Unique. Queer…The Book of Ebenezer Le Page is a eulogy for a way of life." The Los Angeles Times (Valerie Miner)
- "It reads like Beethoven’s Ninth. It charts island life from 1890 to 1970, including the German wartime occupation. In it, weather, darkness, hunger, blood-connectedness, shelter, and an almost painfully keyed-up sexual desire appear in odd, magical proportions never found in any novel conceived off-island. Coated with sea salt, its crannies spilling wildflowers, Edwards’s book still roars like some huge shell held, cutting, against your ear." Allan Gurganus, 'One Great Book Per Life', The Atlantic (March 2005).
- "Imagine a weekend spent in deep conversation with a superb old man, a crusty, intelligent, passionate and individualistic character at the peak of his powers as a raconteur, and you will have a very good idea of the impact of The Book of Ebenezer Le Page…It amuses, it entertains, it moves us… Ebenezer’s voice presides over all and its creation is a tremendous achievement." The Washington Post (Doug Lang)
- "[A] rare find…it is unique–a first novel that resists all categories–and it overflows with the sense of life… Its chief virtues are a story rich in human connection and a marvelously seductive language…For those who cherish style, it is also good to hear a fresh novelist’s voice telling the old story of the passions, generosities, and greeds that battle in us all." —Chicago Tribune (Lynne Sharon Schwartz)
- "G.B. Edwards, who died an unknown in 1976, constructed his novel out of the patterns of daily life–countless teas, lovers’ quarrels, accounts of friendships and the signs of change as Guernsey reluctantly assumes the characteristics of progress. The results are enchanting."The Washington Post (New In Paperback)
- "A remarkable achievement… The book’s voice and its methods are so unusual that it belongs nowhere on our conventional literary maps." —John Fowles
- "[A] knowing and beguiling chronicle of life on the English Channel isle of Guernsey…This deceptively plain-spoken story of a man’s years passing in review before him struck me, when I first read it in 1981, as a beautifully crafted job of writing. Upon rereading it recently, I redoubled my liking and admiration for both Ebenezer and Edwards."Ivan Doig, Christian Science Monitor.
- "The Book of Ebenezer Le Page, by G. B. Edwards, is an inexhaustible book I never tire of giving. It is literally one of a kind, a work with no precedent, sponsorship, or pedigree. A true epic, as sexy as it is hilarious, it seems drenched with the harsh tidal beauties of its setting, the isle of Guernsey…For every person nearing retirement, every latent writer who hopes to leave his island and find the literary mainland, its author–quiet, self-sufficient, tidy Homeric–remains a patron saint." —Allan Gurganus, O Magazine
- "The Book of Ebenezer Le Page, by G. B. Edwards, is an oddity and a great literary wonder, written in the beautiful French patios of Guernsey, one of the Channel Islands…[Edwards] feels intensely about everything and everyone in this deliciously rich novel of longing and love."—Archipelago
- "Here is an islander; an island man, solitary, unmarried, alienated, who describes the modern denaturing of our world. Granite quarries and tomatoes and early potatoes; but then come tourists, international companies, tax evaders, occupation by Germans, etcetera.” The New York Review of Books.
- "Books: Forced to choose, we'd pick The Book of Ebenezer Le Page by G. B. Edwards as our favorite novel of all time. The recollections of a cranky old man on the island of Guernsey, Guy Davenport of the Times wrote, when the book was first published here in 1981: ‘A masterpiece...One of the best novels of our time...I know of no description of happiness in modern literature equal to the one that ends this novel.’ Hard for us to imagine a more pleasurable weekend than one spent with Ebenezer Le Page." Manhattan User’s Guide
- "I actually went on holiday to Jersey twenty years ago and the cottage I was staying in had a copy of Ebenezer Le Page that I read while I was there. And it was absorbing, and one of my most emotional reading experiences. So when I was imagining Guernsey – the family, the way they lived and their relationships with the people around them I was sort of inspired by the way he talks about the island." Lisa Jewell (What books do you find yourself returning to again and again?)
- "Iris Murdoch’s “A Word Child”; Vladimir Nabokov's “Pnin”; Evan Connell's “Mrs. Bridge” and “Mr. Bridge”; G. B. Edwards's “The Book of Ebenezer Le Page.” . . . Well, I could go on and on." Anne Tyler, on books she returns to again and again; New York Times, 5 February 2015.

== See also ==
- Ebenezer Le Page
- Gerald Basil Edwards
