= Ebenezer Le Page =

Fictional character

Ebenezer Le Page is the lead character in the novel The Book of Ebenezer Le Page by G. B. Edwards. The book takes the form of an autobiography of an archetypal Guernseyman who lives through the dramatic changes in the island of Guernsey, Channel Islands from the late 19th century, through to the 1960s. The book is written in Guernsey English (with an occasional smattering of the Guernsey language)

== Fictional biography ==
Ebenezer was born in the late 19th century, and dies in the early 1960s. He lived his whole life in Vale. He never married, despite a few flings with local girls, and a tempestuous relationship with Liza Queripel of Pleinmont. He left the island only once, to travel to Jersey to watch the Muratti Vase, a football match. For most of his life he was a grower and fisherman, although he also served in the North regiment of the Royal Guernsey Militia (though not outside the island) and did some jobbing work for the States of Guernsey in the latter part of his life.

Guernsey is a microcosm of the world as Dublin is to James Joyce and Dorset is to Thomas Hardy. After a life fraught with difficulties and full of moving episodes, Ebenezer dies happy, bequeathing his pot of gold and autobiography (The Book of Ebenezer Le Page) to the young artist he befriends, after an incident in which the latter smashed his greenhouse.
