= Anglia =

Anglia may refer to:

== Places ==
- England, in medieval Latin and several other languages
- Places settled by the Angles:
  - In North Germany:
    - Anglia (peninsula), original home of the Angles in north Germany
  - In England in the early Middle Ages:
    - Most often, East Anglia and, in particular, the Kingdom of East Anglia
    - Mid Anglia (disambiguation)
    - West Anglia (disambiguation) and,
    - Sometimes, especially in medieval contexts, areas to the north also settled by Angles, including the kingdoms of Mercia, Lindsey, Deira and Northumbria

== Companies ==
- Anglia Television or ITV Anglia, the ITV regional franchise in the east of England
- Anglia Regional Co-operative Society Ltd.
- Anglia Building Society, now part of the Nationwide Building Society
- Anglia Railways, a railway company

== Other ==
- Anglia Ruskin University
- University of East Anglia
- Anglia (journal), subtitled Zeitschrift für Englische Philologie, a German journal of English studies
- Anglia, a British propaganda magazine published in Russian language between 1962 and 1992
- Ford Anglia, various models of car built by the Ford Motor Company
- Anglia knight, a sterling silver trophy depicting a knight on horseback used as the ident for ITV Anglia
- HMHS Anglia, a ship

== See also ==
- West Anglia (disambiguation)
- Mid Anglia (disambiguation)
