= Mid Anglia =

Mid Anglia may refer to:

- The central part of the East of England region
- Mid-Anglia Radio, former radio broadcaster
- Mid-Anglia Constabulary, now Cambridgeshire Constabulary

== See also ==
- Anglia (disambiguation)
- East Anglia
- West Anglia (disambiguation)
- Middle Angles
