= West Anglia =

West Anglia may refer to:

- The College of West Anglia, further education college
- The medieval kingdom of Mercia, as the westernmost part of England settled by the Angles
- The West Anglia Main Line (WAML), railway line
  - West Anglia Great Northern, a former WAML franchise operator

== See also ==
- Anglia (disambiguation)
- East Anglia
- Mid Anglia (disambiguation)
