= Guernsey bean jar =

Local dish of Guernsey

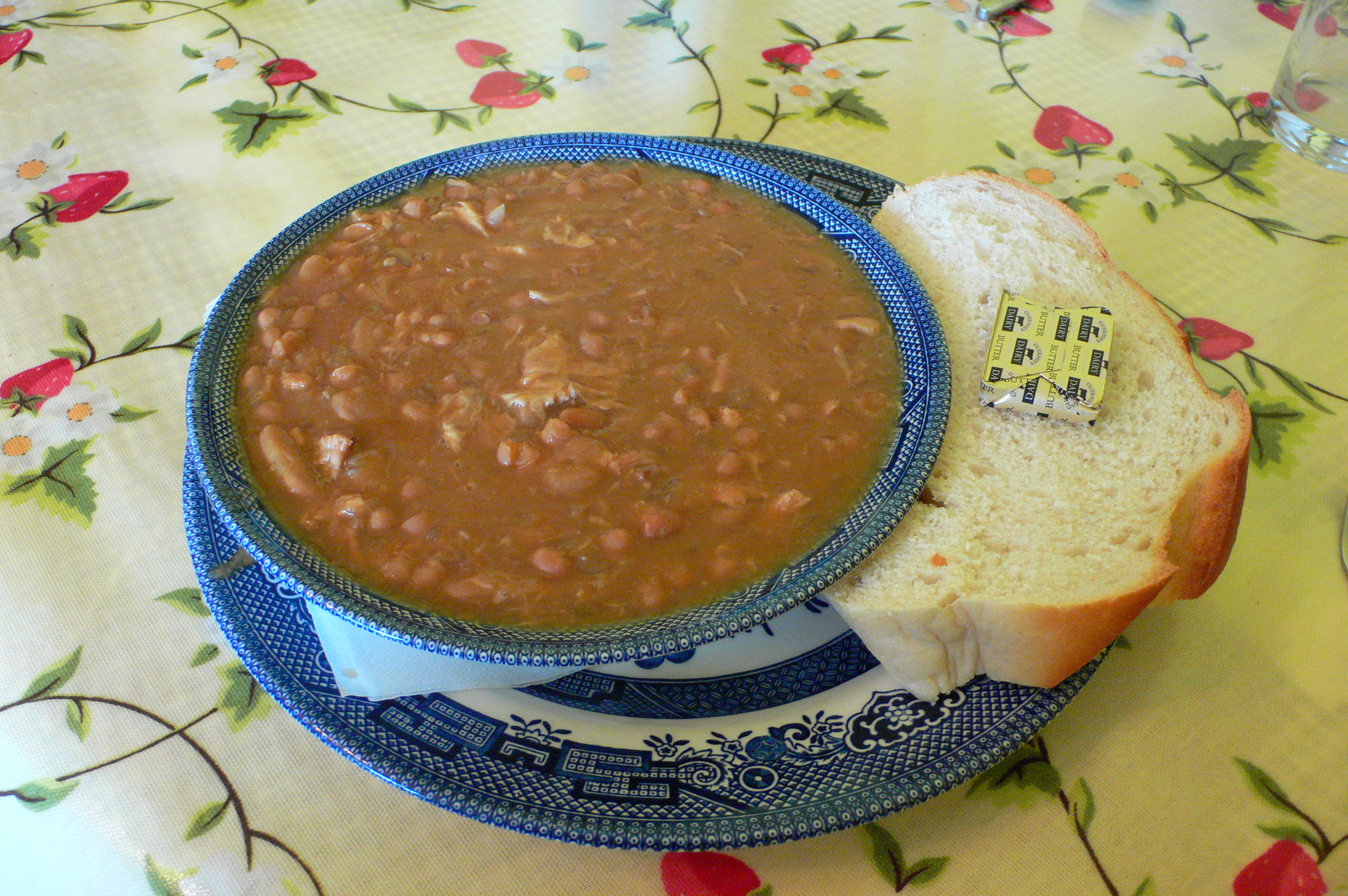
- Bean jar at the Cobo Bay Tearooms in Guernsey
- Alternative names: Moussaettes au four, pot de haricots de Guernesey
- Place of origin: Guernsey
- Main ingredients: Haricot beans, butter beans

Bean jar (Guernésiais: moussaettes au four; French: pot de haricots de Guernesey) is a local dish of the Channel Island of Guernsey. The traditional Guernsey bean jar has been around for centuries, and is still popular today. It is a cassoulet-type bean dish.

== History ==
Bean jar has long been a well known part of Guernsey culture. Bakers would allow residents to cook the dish in their ovens overnight, to be eaten at breakfast. This was common practice until the 1920s, especially on Sundays when the ovens were not used.

The dish is still popular in Guernsey, with local cafes and restaurants often featuring the dish in colder months. It is also served at Lé Viaer Marchi, a National Trust of Guernsey annual festival.

== See also ==
- Beanpot
- List of stews
