= Gerald Basil Edwards =

Guernsey writer (1899–1976)

Gerald Basil Edwards (G. B. Edwards) (8 July 1899 – 29 December 1976) was an author from Guernsey.

== Biography ==
Edwards was born in Vale, Guernsey, the son of Thomas Edwards, a quarry owner, by his wife Harriet (née Mauger). He served in the Royal Guernsey Light Infantry, then spent four years reading English at the University of Bristol (1919–1923), from which he apparently did not graduate; following this, he entered the literary world of London.

Edwards is known for The Book of Ebenezer Le Page, which was published posthumously in 1981. Edwards had worked on his great novel for many years but only completed it towards the end of his life, presenting the typescript to his friend Edward Chaney in August 1974, rather in the manner that the fictional Ebenezer bequeaths his 'Book' to Neville Falla in the novel. The typescript was rejected by all the publishers it was shown to and only after Edwards' death was it taken up by Hamish Hamilton who arranged for John Fowles to write an introduction. It was widely and very favourably reviewed, among others by William Golding and Guy Davenport. Harold Bloom included it in his Western Canon. Penguin produced a paperback and it was published in America and in French translation. It has since been published in Italian by Elliot Edizioni. It is currently in print in Britain and America with New York Review of Books in their Classics series.

In the late 1920s and '30s Edwards had been regarded as a writer and intellectual of great promise, one who might fill the shoes of D. H. Lawrence, whose biography Cape commissioned him to write. He occasionally contributed to Middleton Murry's Adelphi magazine but never completed his larger projects. Eventually his friends Murry, John Stewart Collis and Stephen Potter gave up their hopes in him. By 1933 he had abandoned his wife and children and he did not re-establish contact with his daughter until decades later. He became an itinerant teacher of drama and, latterly, a minor civil servant and something of a recluse. Towards the end of his life, he became a lodger in a house near Weymouth where he was 'discovered' by art student Edward Chaney. The latter encouraged him to complete his novel and eventually got it published.

Edwards died in Weymouth, Dorset. In September 2008 Chaney and Jane Mosse unveiled Guernsey's first blue plaque on Edwards's father's house.

A biography of G. B. Edwards by his friend Chaney was published in September 2015 by Blue Ormer Publishing.

== See also ==
- Ebenezer Le Page
- The Book of Ebenezer Le Page
