= Viaer Marchi =

Annual market fair reenactment in Guernsey

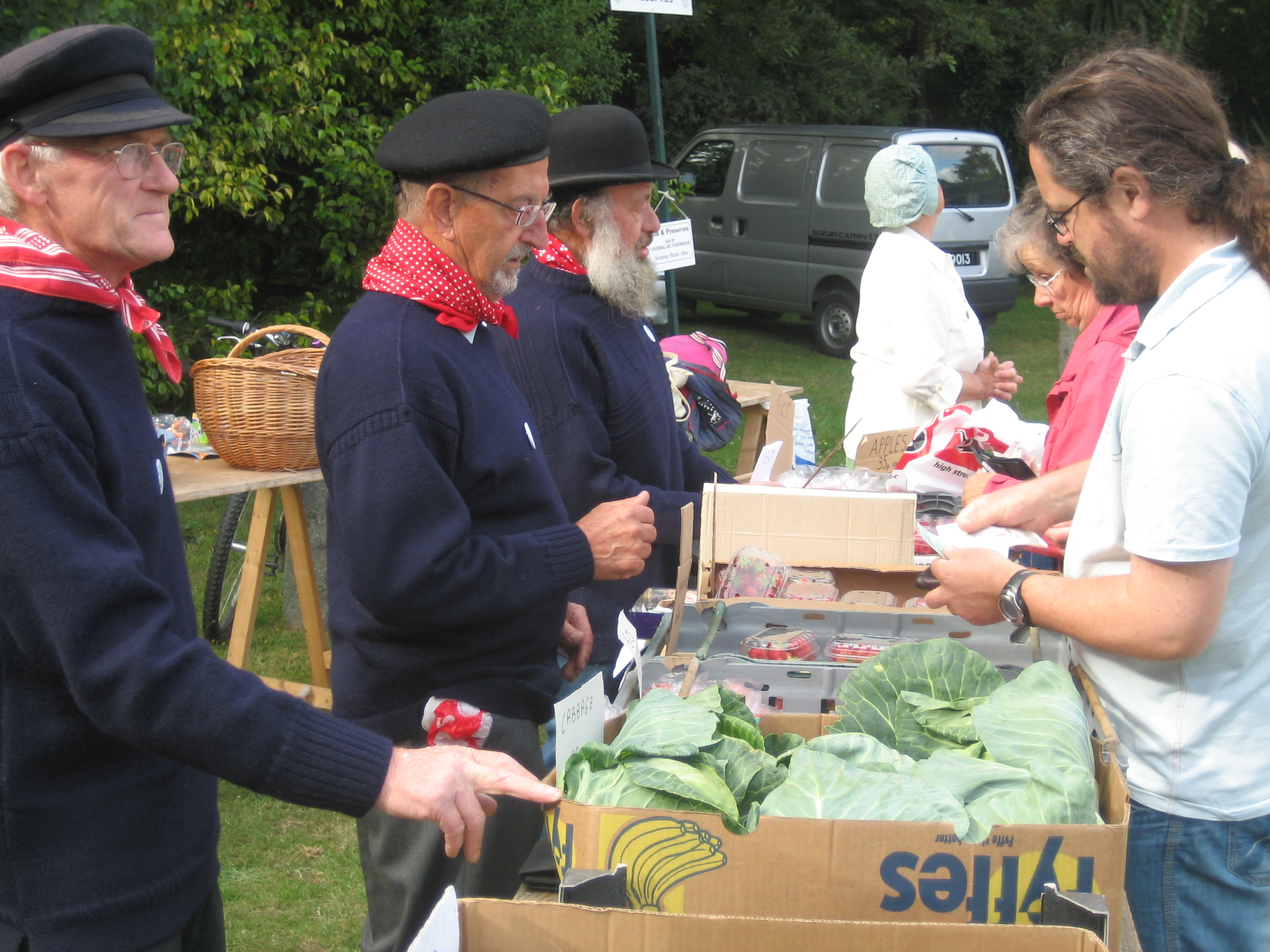
Guernseymen selling produce at the Viaer Marchi

Lé Viaer Marchi (Guernésiais: the old market) is an annual community festival held in Guernsey, generally on the first Monday of July.

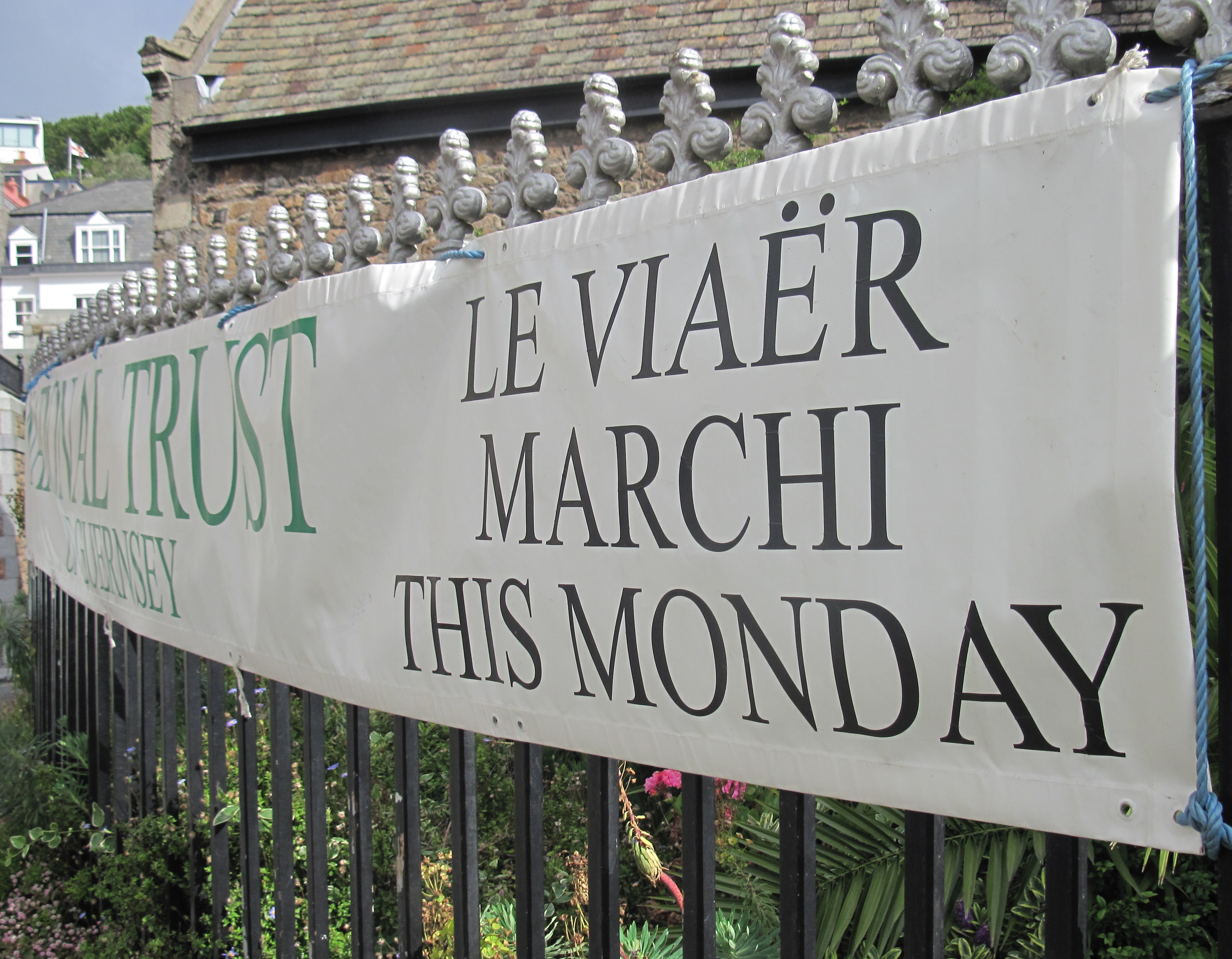
Lé Viaer Marchi advertised on a banner in 2012

== Purpose and organisation ==
Lé Viaer Marchi is both a cultural show event, and the most important fundraising event for the National Trust of Guernsey. Organised by a committee within the National Trust and generally run on the first Monday each July, it is a re-enactment of a 1900s market fair, complete with cultural aspects.

== History ==
The regular reenactment of a market fair was begun in 1969 by Peggy Carey, later an MBE, who, with four friends, had in 1960 founded the National Trust of Guernsey. From the beginning known as Viaer Marchi or old market, the first event took place in the courtyard of the Guernsey Folk Museum in Saumarez Park, and it is still generally held within the park. As of 2019, for the 50th anniversary, the organising committee was headed by the founder's grandson, Andrew Carey.

It was deferred in 2012 due to a royal visit and cancelled for 2020 due to the COVID-19 outbreak.

== Structure ==
The fair showcases local craftsmanship in Guernsey's history and includes displays showing the way in which Guernseymen and women used to live. Delicacies and traditional foods and drinks are served, with Guernsey Bean Jar being one of the most popular, along with Guernsey Gâche (a type of fruit bread), honey, butter and both mead and cider. There is also a selection of activities for children. There are stalls set up for various bric-a-brac. Craftwork sold includes woodwork and lace. Entertainment includes traditional dancing, bands performing local folk music, street entertainers, and sometimes Punch and Judy shows.

Typically the show attracts around 6,000 visitors, between locals and tourists.
