= Guernsey =

English Channel island near Normandy

Guernsey Guernési (Guernésiais)
- Jurisdiction of the Bailiwick of Guernsey
- Flag Coat of arms
- Anthem: "Sarnia Cherie"
- Location of Guernsey (circled) in the Bailiwick of Guernsey (red)

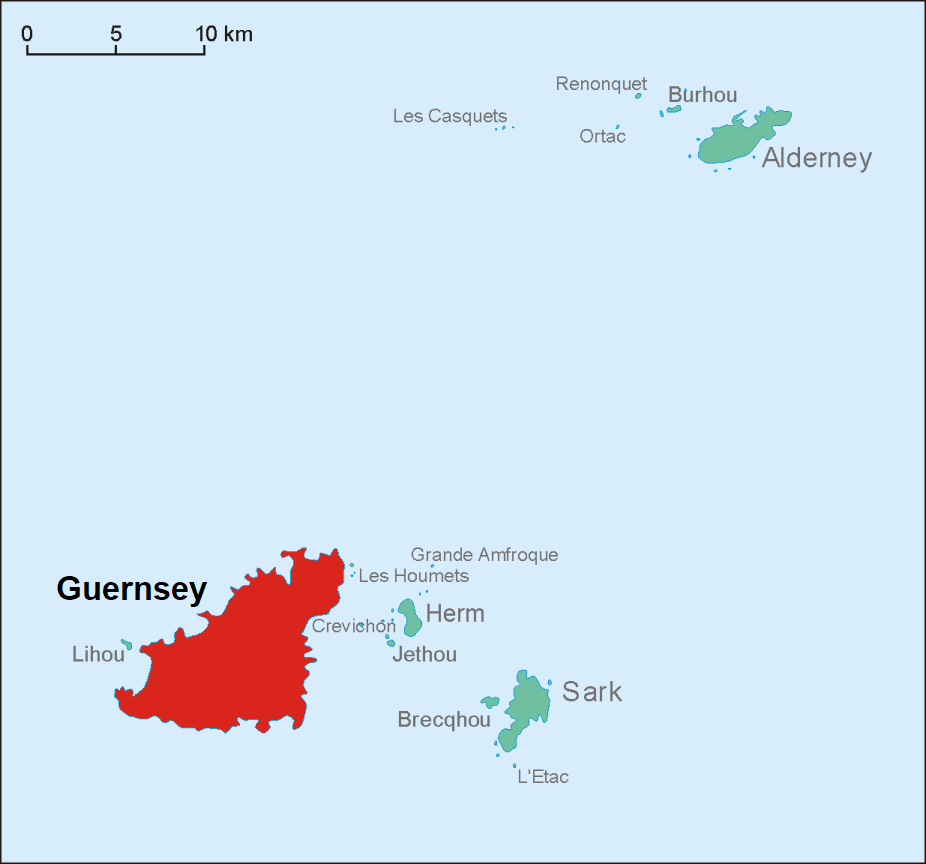
- Map of Guernsey within the Bailiwick
- Sovereign state responsible for Guernsey: United Kingdom
- Crown Dependency: Bailiwick of Guernsey
- Separation from the Duchy of Normandy: 1204
- Capital and largest city: Saint Peter Port; 49°27′36″N 2°32′7″W
- Official languages: Guernésiais, English
- Recognised regional languages: Sercquiais; Auregnais (Note: Extinct language.)
- Ethnic groups: 95.8% White; 1.9% Asian
- Demonym(s): Guernseyman; Guernseywoman; Giernésiais(e); Sarnian
- Government: Self-governing parliamentary constitutional monarchy
  - Duke of Normandy: Charles III
  - Lieutenant Governor: Richard Cripwell
  - Bailiff: Jessica Roland
  - Chief Minister: Lindsay de Sausmarez
- Legislature: States of Guernsey

Government of the United Kingdom
  - Minister: Baron Lemos

Area
  - Total: 62 (Note: Comprising the island of Guernsey only.) km^{2} (24 sq mi)
  - Water (%): 0

Population
  - 2023 census: 64,781 (Note: Figure is for Guernsey, Herm, Jethou and Lihou. Excludes Alderney, Sark and Breqhou.) (not ranked)
  - Density: 965/km^{2} (2,499.3/sq mi)
- GDP (PPP): 2018 estimate
  - Total: £3.272 billion
  - Per capita: £52,531
- Currency: Guernsey pound (Note: The Guernsey pound is not a separate currency, but a local issue of standard pound sterling.); Pound sterling (£) (GBP)
- Time zone: UTC+00:00 (GMT)
  - Summer (DST): UTC+01:00 (BST)
- Date format: dd/mm/yyyy
- Driving side: Left
- Calling code: +44
- UK postcode: GY1–GY8
- ISO 3166 code: GG
- Internet TLD: .gg

Guernsey (/ˈɡɜːrnzi/ GURN-zee; Guernésiais: Guernési) is the second-largest island in the Channel Islands, located 27 miles (43 km) west of the Cotentin Peninsula, Normandy. It is the largest island in the Bailiwick of Guernsey, which includes five other inhabited islands – Alderney, Herm, Jethou, Brecqhou and Sark – and many small islets and rocks. In 2023, the population of the island was 64,781. The land area of the island is 24 square miles (62 km^{2}).

Guernsey was part of the Duchy of Normandy until 1204, when the Channel Islands remained loyal to the English crown, splitting from mainland Normandy. In 1290, the Channel Islands were divided administratively and Guernsey became part of the Bailiwick of Guernsey. During the Second World War, Guernsey was invaded and occupied by Nazi Germany. After five years of occupation, the island was liberated on 9 May 1945, that date being celebrated annually as Liberation Day.

Guernsey is administered as part of the Bailiwick of Guernsey, a self-governing dependency of the British Crown. The island is thus not part of the United Kingdom, although the UK government has certain responsibilities for the Bailiwick. The British monarch is the head of state and the head of government is the President of the Policy and Resources Committee. The jurisdiction's parliament and government is the States of Guernsey. The island is divided into ten parishes. It has one town, called Saint Peter Port. The government variously defines the position of the King of England as "Head of State" or "successor to the Duke of Normandy." Although no document explicitly defines the Head of State as a "monarch", or the islands as a monarchy, all documents refer to the king by royal titles.

Guernsey's largest industry is financial services, followed by tourism and agriculture. The island is particularly well known for its cattle. Guernsey's culture is strongly influenced by Britain, evident in its use of the pound sterling and the status of English as the primary native language. Norman and French culture have also had an impact, such as with the island's traditional language, Guernésiais. French writer Victor Hugo spent fifteen years in exile in Guernsey, where he wrote some of his best-known works.

== Toponymy ==
The island's name, "Guernsey", like that of neighbouring "Jersey", is of Old Norse origin. The second element of each word, "-ey", is the Old Norse for "island", while the original root, "guern(s)", is of uncertain origin and meaning, possibly deriving from either a personal name such as Grani or Warinn, or from grǫn, meaning spruce or pine.

Previous names for the Channel Islands vary over history, but include the Lenur islands, and Sarnia; Sarnia for Guernsey, or Lisia (Guernsey) and Angia (Jersey).

== History ==
=== Early history ===
Around 6000BC, rising seas created the English Channel and separated the Norman promontories that became the bailiwicks of Guernsey and Jersey from continental Europe. Neolithic farmers then settled on its coast and built the dolmens and menhirs found in the islands today, providing evidence of human presence dating back to around 5000 BC.

Evidence of Roman settlements on the island, and the discovery of amphorae from the Herculaneum area and Spain, show evidence of an intricate trading network with regional and long-distance trade. Buildings found in La Plaiderie, St. Peter Port dating from 100 to 400 AD appear to be warehouses. The earliest evidence of shipping was the discovery of a wreck of a ship in St Peter Port harbour, which has been named Asterix. It is thought to be a 3rd-century Roman cargo vessel and was probably at anchor or grounded when a fire broke out. Travelling from the Kingdom of Gwent, Saint Sampson, later the abbot of Dol in Brittany, is credited with the introduction of Christianity to Guernsey.

=== Middle Ages ===
In 933, the Cotentin Peninsula, including Avranchin, which included the islands, were placed by the French King Ranulf under the control of William I. The island of Guernsey and the other Channel Islands represent the last remnants of the medieval Duchy of Normandy.

About the year 1030, the fleet of Robert, Duke of Normandy, which was to support the claim of his cousins Alfred and Edward to the English crown against Canute, was scattered by a storm, and was driven down the Channel to Guernsey. The Duke was taken to St. Michael's Abbey. In gratitude for the abbot's hospitality, he gave all the lands within the Close of the Vale to the abbot forever as fief of St. Michael, with permission to extend this to the northwestern part of the island as soon as settlers could be found to clear and cultivate the land; and he gave them engineers and workmen to complete the castle of St. Michael and to erect such other forts as were deemed necessary.

Around the middle of the eleventh century, Guernsey was beset by a new breed of pirates who built a castle called Le Château des Sarrasins in the centre of the island near the present church of Catel; Duke William of Normandy (later the Conqueror) commissioned his Esquire Sampson d'Anneville to fight them. As a reward, in 1061, he received half of the western part of the island under the title of Fief d'Anneville. Sampson attracted many emigrants from Normandy to settle on his feudal estate, and Duke William distributed lands in Guernsey to other Norman landowners, such as the estates of Sausmarez, Les Bruniaux de St. Martin, Mauxmarquis, Rohais, etc.

Most of Guernsey was soon cultivated, and around this time the island was divided into ten parishes. Each free fief had a manorial court to hear disputes between tenants, and the Abbot of St. Michael and the Seigneur d'Anneville had the right of high jurisdiction and the privilege of trying and executing criminals, respectively, so that the civil order of the island was fully regulated even before the Norman conquest of England.

In 1204, when King John lost the continental portion of the Duchy to Philip II of France, the islands remained part of the Kingdom of England. The islands were then recognised by the 1259 Treaty of Paris as part of Henry III's territories.

During the Middle Ages, the island was a haven for pirates that would use the "lamping technique" to ground ships close to the island. This intensified during the Hundred Years War, when, starting in 1339, the island was occupied by the Capetians on several occasions. The Guernsey Militia was first mentioned as operational in 1331 and would help defend the island for a further 600 years.

In 1372, the island was invaded by Aragonese mercenaries under the command of Owain Lawgoch (remembered as Yvon de Galles), who was in the pay of the French king. Owain and his dark-haired mercenaries were later absorbed into Guernsey legend as invading fairies from across the sea.

=== Early modern period ===
As part of the peace between England and France, Pope Sixtus IV issued in 1483 a papal bull granting the "Privilege of Neutrality'", by which "the Islands, their harbours and seas, as far as the eye can see," were considered neutral territory. Anyone molesting Islanders would be excommunicated. A royal charter in 1548 confirmed the neutrality. The French attempted to invade Jersey a year later in 1549 but were defeated by the militia. The neutrality lasted another century, until William III of England abolished the privilege due to privateering activity against Dutch ships.

In the mid-16th century, the island was influenced by Calvinist reformers from Normandy. During the Marian persecutions, three women, the Guernsey Martyrs, were burned at the stake for their Protestant beliefs, along with the infant son of one of the women. The burning of the infant was ordered by Bailiff Hellier Gosselin, with the advice of priests nearby who said the boy should burn due to having inherited moral stain from his mother. Later on, Hellier Gosselin fled the island to escape widespread outrage.

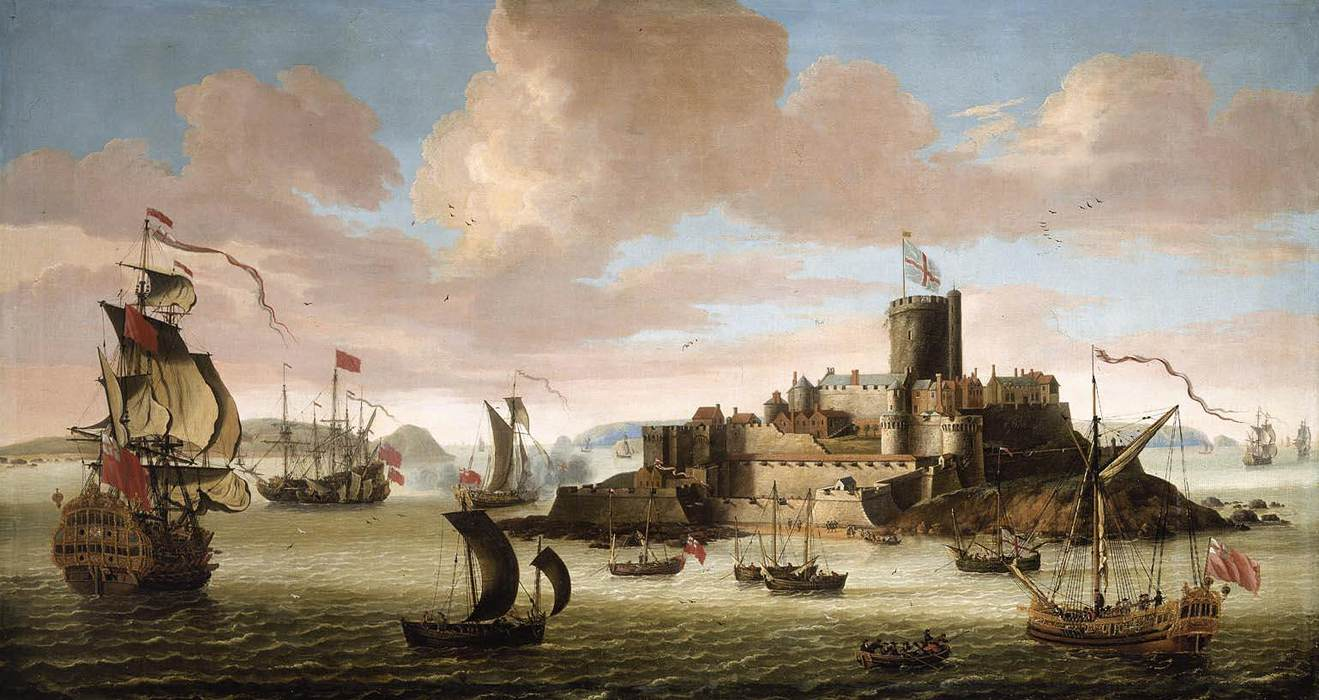
Castle Cornet over the harbour of St Peter Port in the second half of the 17th century

During the English Civil War, Guernsey sided with the Parliamentarians. The allegiance was not total, however; there were a few Royalist uprisings in the southwest of the island, while Castle Cornet was occupied by the Governor, Sir Peter Osborne, and Royalist troops. In December 1651, with full honours of war, Castle Cornet surrendered—the last Royalist outpost anywhere in the British Isles to surrender.

Wars against France and Spain during the 17th and 18th centuries allowed Guernsey shipowners and sea captains to exploit the island's proximity to mainland Europe by applying for letters of marque and turning their cargo ships into privateering vessels.

By the beginning of the 18th century, Guernsey's residents were starting to settle in North America, in particular founding Guernsey County in Ohio in 1810. The threat of invasion by Napoleon prompted many defensive structures to be built at the end of that century. The early 19th century saw a dramatic increase in the prosperity of the island, due to its success in the global maritime trade, and the rise of the stone industry. Maritime trade suffered a major decline with the move away from sailing craft as materials such as iron and steel were not available on the island.

Le Braye du Valle was a tidal channel that made the northern extremity of Guernsey, Le Clos du Valle, a tidal island. Le Braye du Valle was drained and reclaimed in 1806 by the British Government as a defence measure. The eastern end of the former channel became the town and harbour (from 1820) of St Sampson's, now the second biggest port in Guernsey. The western end of La Braye is now Le Grand Havre. The roadway called "The Bridge" across the end of the harbour at St Sampson's recalls the bridge that formerly linked the two parts of Guernsey at high tide. New roads were built and main roads were metalled for ease of use by the military. Infrastructure was funded by creating money debt-free starting in 1815.

=== Contemporary period ===
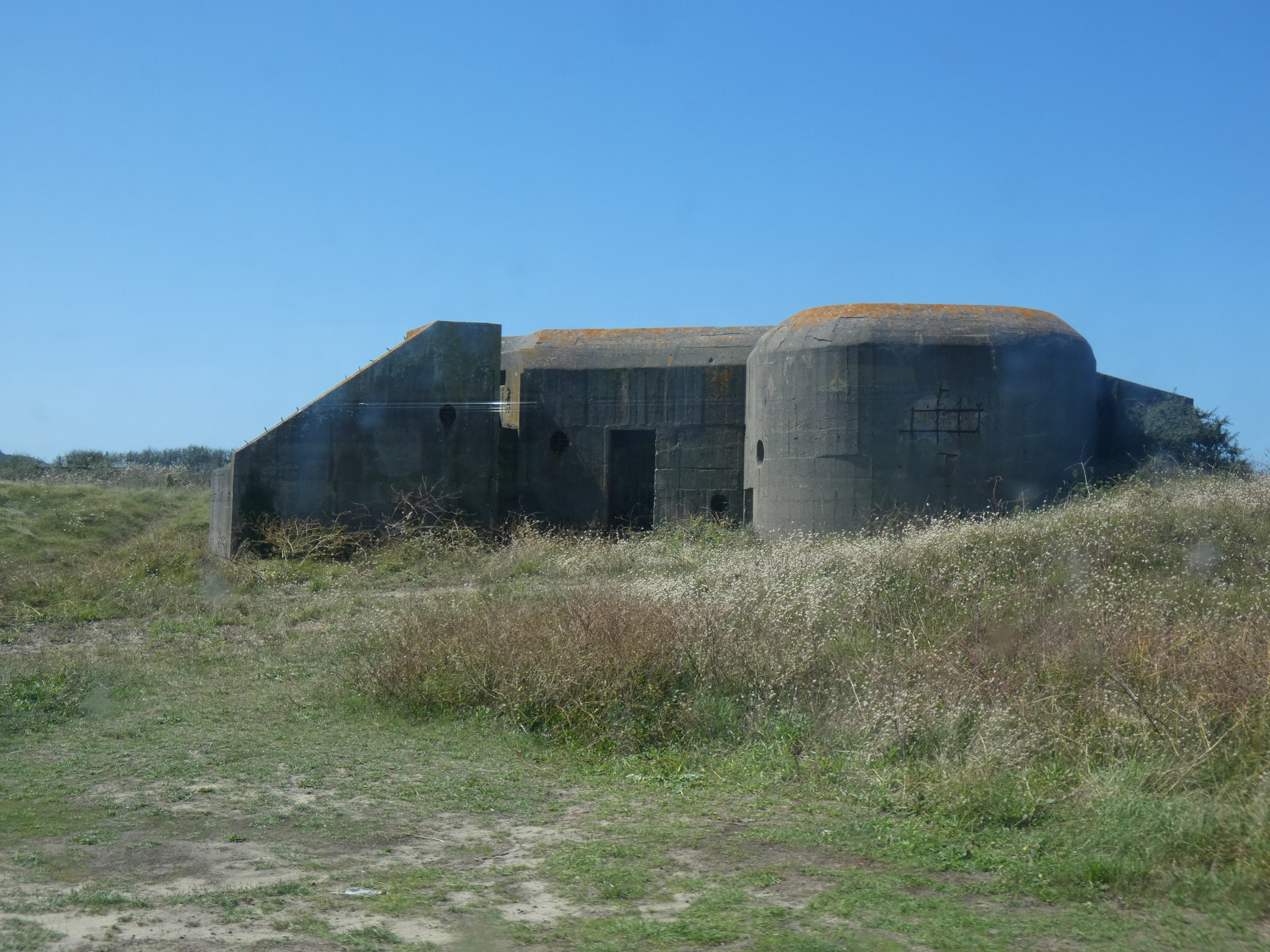
A German bunker from the Atlantic Wall

During the First World War, about 3,000 island men served in the British Expeditionary Force. Of these, about 1,000 served in the Royal Guernsey Light Infantry regiment formed from the Royal Guernsey Militia in 1916.

From 30 June 1940, during the Second World War, the Channel Islands were occupied by German troops. Out of a total population of 41,000, some 17,000 people were evacuated to England before the German occupation. The evacuees included 80 per cent of Guernsey children who lived with relatives or strangers in Great Britain during the war. Most children returned home after the war ended in 1945.

The occupying German forces deported over 1,000 Guernsey residents to camps in southern Germany, notably to the Lager Lindele (Lindele Camp) near Biberach an der Riß and to Oflag VII-C in Laufen. Guernsey was very heavily fortified during World War II, out of all proportion to the island's strategic value. German defences and alterations remain visible, particularly to Castle Cornet and around the northern coast of the island. Guernsey and Jersey were both liberated on 9 May 1945, now celebrated as Liberation Day on the two islands.

During the late 1940s, the island repaired the damage caused to its buildings during the occupation. The tomato industry started up again and thrived until the 1970s when the significant increase in world oil prices led to a sharp, terminal decline. Tourism has remained important. Finance businesses grew in the 1970s, expanding in the next two decades, and are important employers. Guernsey's constitutional and trading relationships with the UK are largely unaffected by Brexit.

== Geography ==
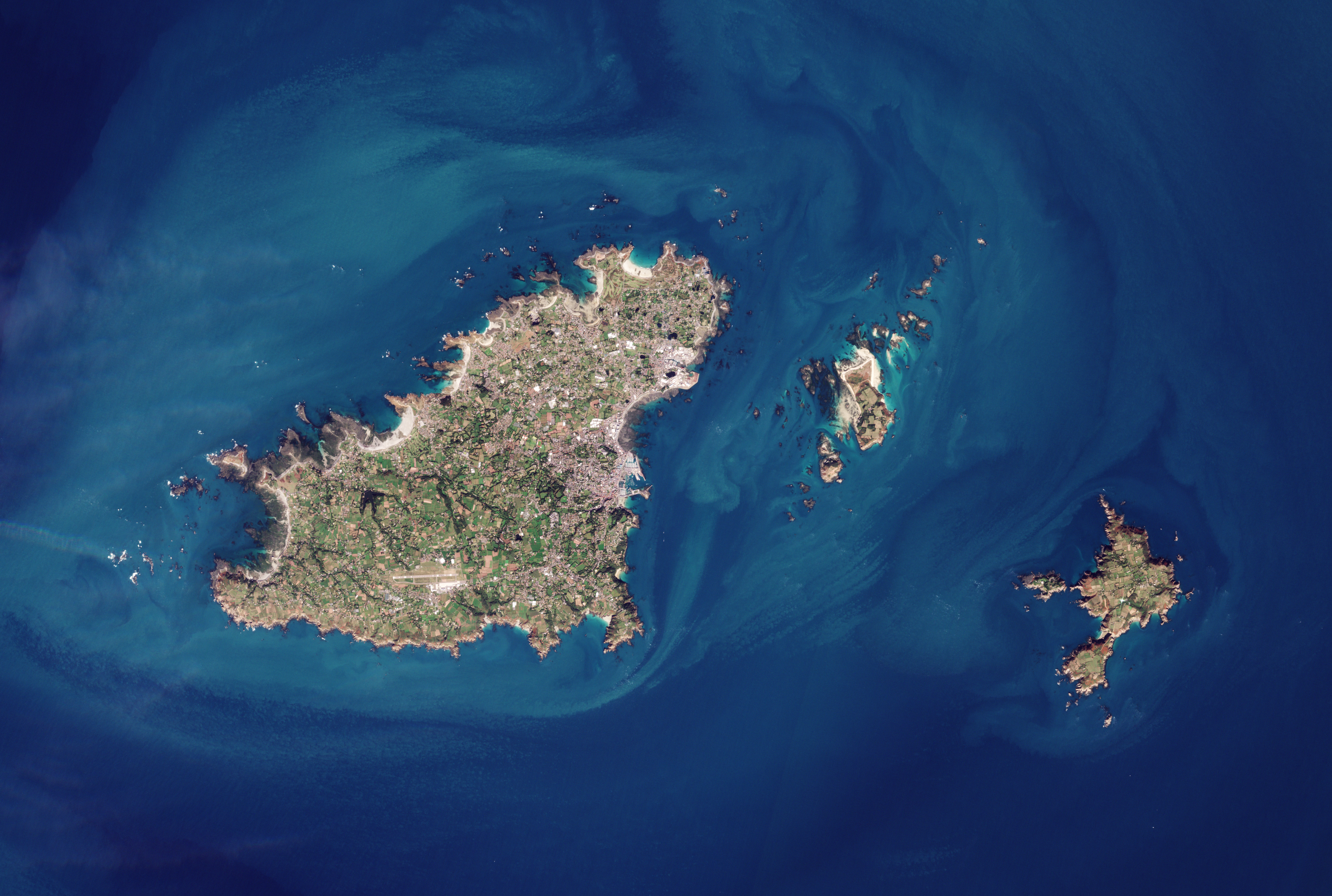
The islands of Guernsey, Herm and Sark (left to right) as seen from space

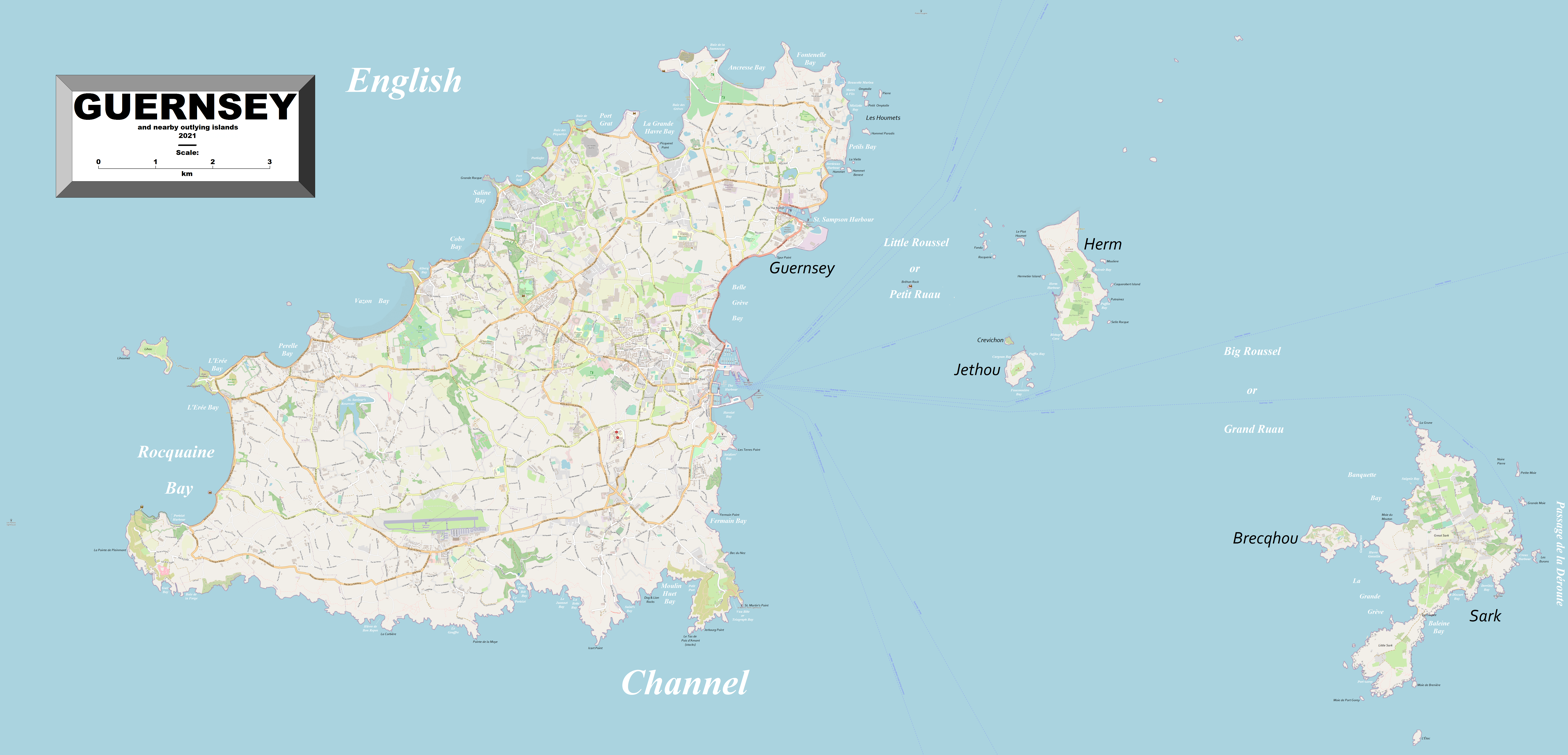
A detailed map of Guernsey and nearby islands

Situated around 49°35′N 2°20′W, Guernsey, Herm and some other smaller islands together have a total area of 71 square kilometres (27 sq mi) and coastlines of about 46 kilometres (29 mi). Elevation varies from sea level to 110 m (360 ft) at Hautnez on Guernsey.

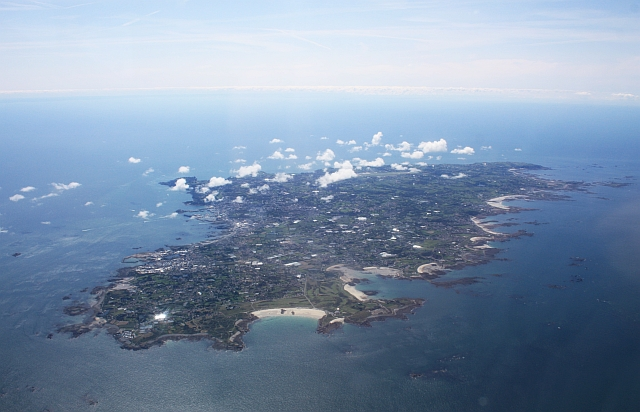
Guernsey from the air

There are many smaller islands, islets, rocks and reefs in Guernsey waters. Combined with a tidal range of 10 metres (33 feet) and fast currents of up to 12 knots, this makes sailing in local waters dangerous. The very large tidal variation provides an environmentally rich inter-tidal zone around the islands, and some sites have received Ramsar Convention designation.

The tidal flows in the area are remarkable, owing to the flatness of the ground for nearly 32km (20mi) westward. Guernsey is the westernmost of the Channel Islands, and the jurisdiction is at the greatest distance from the coast of Normandy than any of the other islands.

=== Climate ===
Guernsey's climate is temperate, with mild winters and mild, sunny summers. It is classified as an oceanic climate, with a dry-summer trend, although marginally wetter than Mediterranean summers. The warmest months are July and August, when temperatures are generally around 20 °C (68 °F), with some days occasionally going above 24 °C (75 °F).

On average, the coldest month is February, with an average air temperature of 6.9 °C (44.4 °F). Average air temperature reaches 17.1 °C (62.8 °F) in August. Snow rarely falls, and is unlikely to settle, but is most likely to fall in February. Temperatures rarely drop below freezing, although strong wind-chill from Arctic winds can sometimes make it feel like it. The rainiest months are December (average 119 mm (4.7 in)), November (average 107 mm (4.2 in)) and January (average 92 mm (3.6 in)). July is, on average, the sunniest month, with 253 hours recorded sunshine; December the least, with 58 hours recorded sunshine.

Sea temperatures have been rising, and now vary between 8 °C (46 °F) in February to 20 °C (68 °F) in August. Average wind speeds vary between 20 kilometres per hour (12 mph) and 40 kilometres per hour (25 mph), with gusts over 60 kilometres per hour (37 mph) every four to five years.

Climate data for Guernsey Airport (GCI) (1991–2020 normals, extremes 1947–present)
Month	Jan	Feb	Mar	Apr	May	Jun	Jul	Aug	Sep	Oct	Nov	Dec	Year
Record high °C (°F)	13.3 (55.9)	16.1 (61.0)	19.6 (67.3)	24.5 (76.1)	31.5 (88.7)	36.4 (97.5)	34.2 (93.6)	34.3 (93.7)	30.6 (87.1)	24.3 (75.7)	18.0 (64.4)	15.6 (60.1)	36.4 (97.5)
Mean daily maximum °C (°F)	9.0 (48.2)	8.8 (47.8)	10.2 (50.4)	12.4 (54.3)	15.1 (59.2)	17.7 (63.9)	19.6 (67.3)	19.9 (67.8)	18.2 (64.8)	15.3 (59.5)	12.1 (53.8)	9.9 (49.8)	14.0 (57.2)
Daily mean °C (°F)	7.2 (45.0)	6.9 (44.4)	8.0 (46.4)	9.7 (49.5)	12.3 (54.1)	14.8 (58.6)	16.7 (62.1)	17.1 (62.8)	15.7 (60.3)	13.2 (55.8)	10.3 (50.5)	8.1 (46.6)	11.7 (53.1)
Mean daily minimum °C (°F)	5.4 (41.7)	4.9 (40.8)	5.8 (42.4)	7.0 (44.6)	9.4 (48.9)	11.8 (53.2)	13.8 (56.8)	14.2 (57.6)	13.1 (55.6)	11.1 (52.0)	8.4 (47.1)	6.3 (43.3)	9.3 (48.7)
Record low °C (°F)	−7.8 (18.0)	−7.2 (19.0)	−2.2 (28.0)	−1.4 (29.5)	0.1 (32.2)	5.4 (41.7)	8.3 (46.9)	9.2 (48.6)	5.8 (42.4)	3.5 (38.3)	−0.8 (30.6)	−3.8 (25.2)	−7.8 (18.0)
Average precipitation mm (inches)	92.0 (3.62)	75.8 (2.98)	63.3 (2.49)	54.0 (2.13)	49.0 (1.93)	47.9 (1.89)	43.2 (1.70)	56.6 (2.23)	55.2 (2.17)	97.9 (3.85)	106.7 (4.20)	119.3 (4.70)	860.9 (33.89)
Average precipitation days (≥ 1.0 mm)	14.1	12.0	10.4	9.3	8.2	7.3	7.2	8.4	8.5	13.6	15.6	16.3	130.9
Mean monthly sunshine hours	62.6	87.0	135.3	200.7	238.9	245.9	253.3	226.8	183.9	120.1	76.8	58.3	1,889.6
Source: Guernsey Met Office

==== Carbon ====
Guernsey plans to reach carbon neutrality by 2050, according to the Climate Change Policy & Action Plan adopted in August 2020.

=== Geology ===
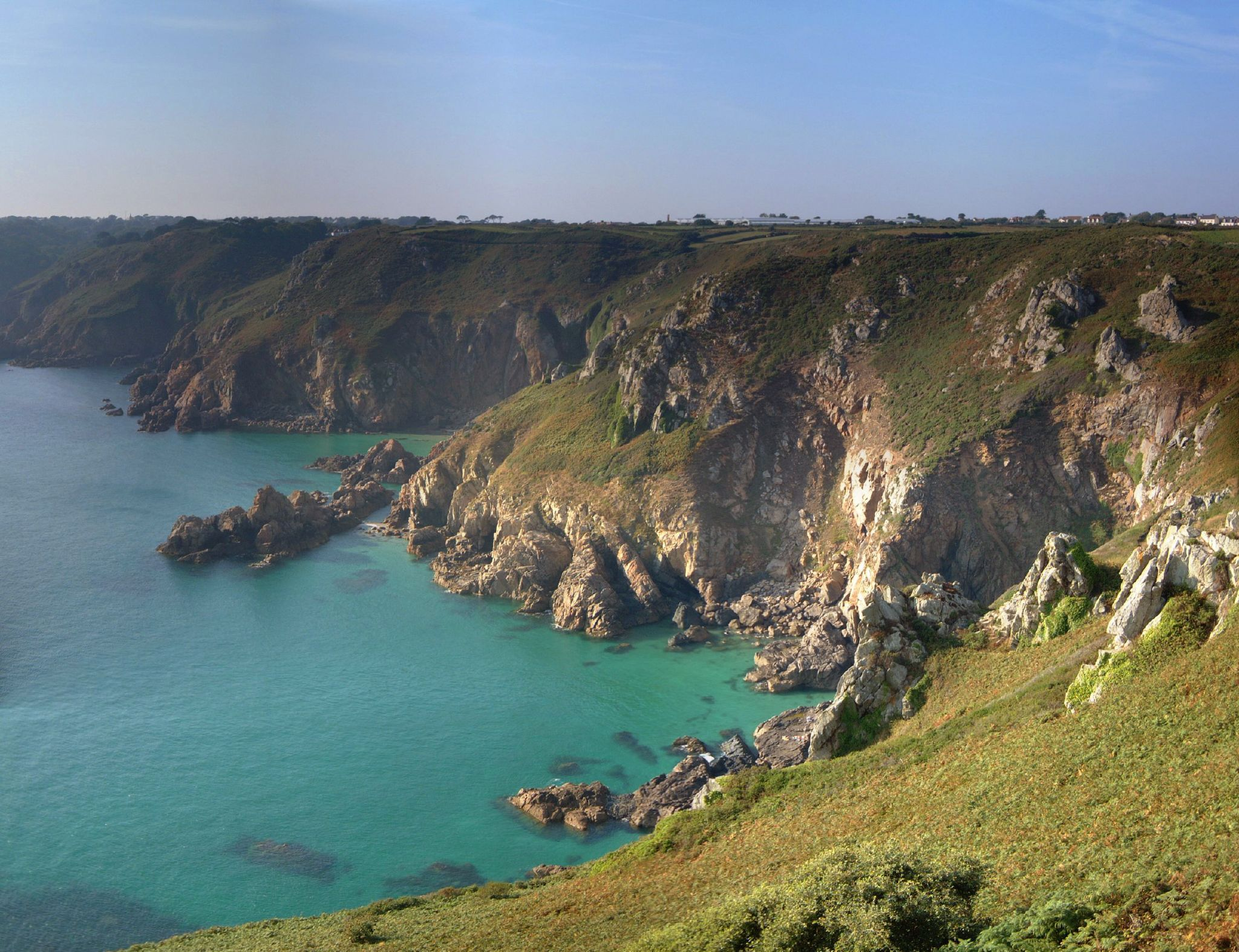
Guernsey cliffs

Guernsey has a geological history stretching further back into the past than most of Europe. It forms part of the geological province of France known as the Armorican Massif. There is a broad geological division between the north and south of the island. The Southern Metamorphic Complex is elevated above the geologically younger, lower-lying Northern Igneous Complex. Guernsey has experienced a complex geological evolution (especially the rocks of the southern complex) with multiple phases of intrusion and deformation recognisable.

Guernsey is composed of nine main rock types; two of these are granites and the rest gneiss.

== Politics ==
Guernsey is a self-governing parliamentary representative democracy and British Crown Dependency. The Lieutenant Governor of Guernsey is the "representative of the Crown in right of the république of the Bailiwick of Guernsey". The official residence of the Lieutenant Governor is Government House. Since 2022, the incumbent has been Lieutenant General Richard Cripwell. The post was created in 1835 as a result of the abolition of the office of Governor. Since that point, the Lieutenant Governor has always resided locally.

The jurisdiction is not part of the United Kingdom, although defence and most foreign relations are handled by the British Government.

The entire jurisdiction lies within the Common Travel Area of the British Islands and the Republic of Ireland. Taken together with the separate jurisdictions of Alderney and Sark it forms the Bailiwick of Guernsey.

=== States of Guernsey ===
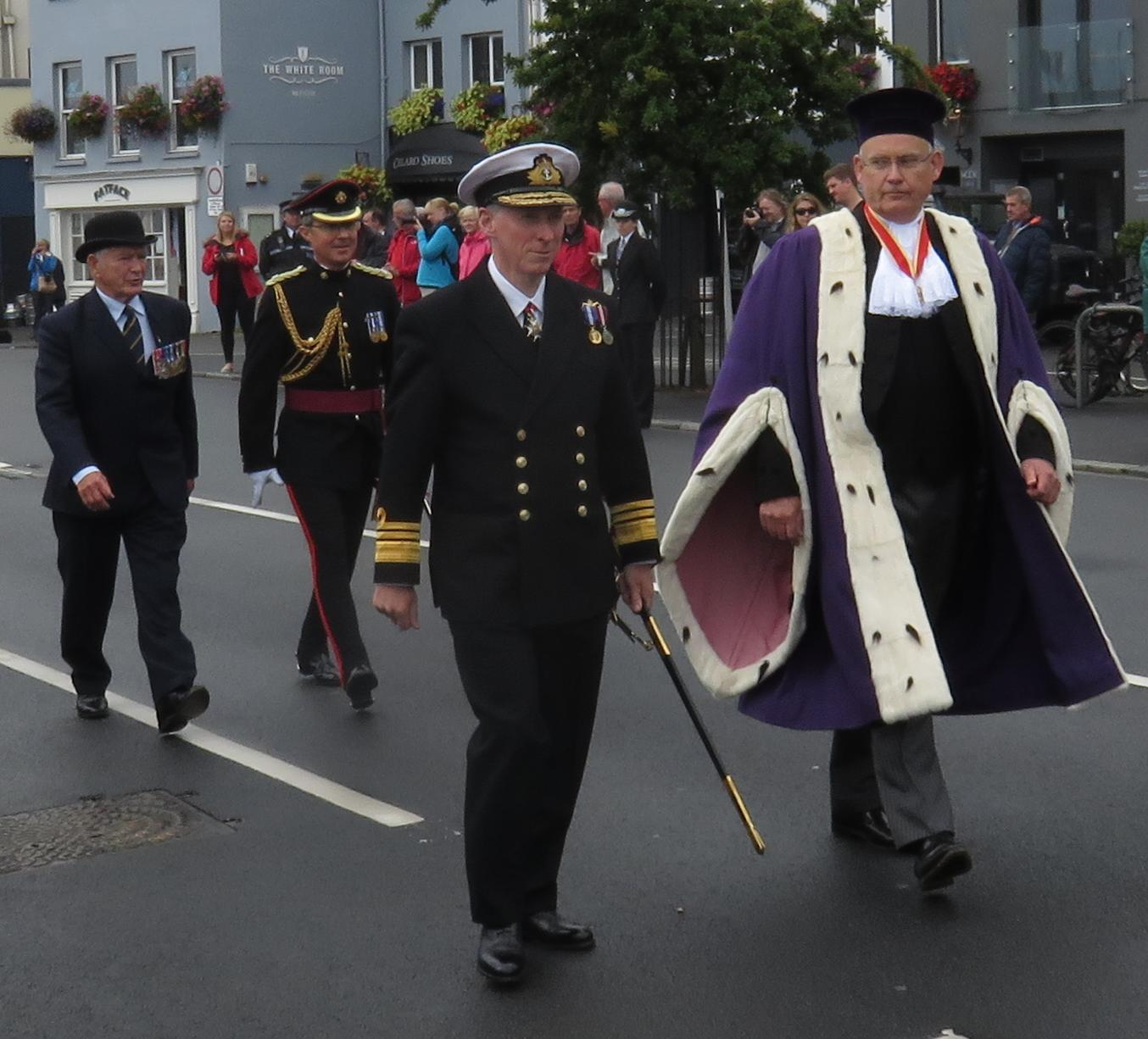
Bailiff Richard Collas (right) attending Elizabeth II's birthday parade 2016 in his formal robes

The deliberative assembly of the States of Guernsey (États de Guernesey) is called the States of Deliberation (États de Délibération) and consists of 38 People's Deputies, elected on an islandwide basis every four years. There are also two representatives from Alderney, a semi-autonomous dependency of the Bailiwick, but Sark sends no representative since it has its own legislature. The Bailiff or Deputy Bailiff preside in the assembly. There are also two non-voting members: H.M. Procureur (analogous to the role of Attorney General) and H.M. Comptroller (analogous to Solicitor General), both appointed by the Crown and collectively known as the Law Officers of the Crown.

A projet de loi is the equivalent of a UK bill or a French projet de loi, and a law is the equivalent of a UK act of parliament or a French loi. A draft law passed by the States can have no legal effect until formally approved by His Majesty in Council and promulgated by means of an order in council. Laws are given the Royal Sanction at regular meetings of the Privy Council in London, after which they are returned to the islands for formal registration at the Royal Court. The States also make delegated legislation known as Ordinances (Ordonnances) and Orders (ordres) which do not require the Royal Assent. Commencement orders are usually in the form of ordinances.

The Policy and Resources Committee is responsible for Guernsey's constitutional and external affairs, developing strategic and corporate policy and coordinating States business. It also examines proposals and Reports placed before Guernsey's Parliament (the States of Deliberation) by Departments and Non States Bodies. The President of the committee is the de facto head of government of Guernsey.

=== Legal system ===
Guernsey's legal system originates in Norman Customary Law, overlaid with principles taken from English common law and Equity as well as from statute law enacted by the competent legislature(s) – usually, but not always, the States of Guernsey. Guernsey has almost complete autonomy over internal affairs and certain external matters. However, the Crown – that is to say, the UK Government – retains an ill-defined reserved power to intervene in the domestic affairs of any of the three Crown Dependencies within the British Islands "in the interests of good government". The UK Parliament is also a source of Guernsey law for those matters which are reserved to the UK, namely defence and foreign affairs.

The head of the bailiwick judiciary in Guernsey is the Bailiff, who, as well as performing the judicial functions of a Chief Justice, is also the head of the States of Guernsey and has certain civic, ceremonial and executive functions. The Bailiff's functions may be exercised by the Deputy Bailiff. The posts of Bailiff and Deputy Bailiff are Crown appointments. Sixteen Jurats, who need no specific legal training, are elected by the States of Election from among Islanders. They act as a jury, as judges in civil and criminal cases and fix the sentence in criminal cases. First mentioned in 1179, there is a list of Jurats who have served since 1299.

The oldest Courts of Guernsey can be traced back to the 9th century. The principal court is the Royal Court and exercises both civil and criminal jurisdiction. Additional courts, such as the Magistrate's Court, which deals with minor criminal matters, and the Court of Appeal, which hears appeals from the Royal Court, have been added to the Island's legal system over the years.

=== External relations ===
Several European countries have a consular presence within the jurisdiction. The French Consulate is based at Victor Hugo's former residence at Hauteville House.

While the jurisdiction of Guernsey has complete autonomy over internal affairs and certain external matters, the topic of complete independence from the British Crown has been discussed widely and frequently, with ideas ranging from Guernsey obtaining independence as a Dominion to the bailiwicks of Guernsey and Jersey uniting and forming an independent Federal State within the Commonwealth, whereby both islands retain their independence with regards to domestic affairs, but, internationally, the islands would be regarded as one state.

Although it was not a member of the European Union, Guernsey had a special relationship with it until Brexit. It had been treated as part of the European Community, with access to the single market for the purposes of the free trade in goods. From 2021, with free travel to the continent ceasing, additional bureaucratic procedures come into force, including the need for international driving licences.

=== Parishes ===
A map of Guernsey's parishes

Guernsey has ten parishes, which act as civil administration districts with limited powers. Each parish is administered by a Douzaine, made up of twelve members or more, known as Douzeniers. Douzeniers are elected for a four-year mandate, three, four or five Douzeniers being elected by parishioners at a parish meeting each year. The senior Douzenier is known as the Doyen (Dean).

Two elected Constables (Connétables) carry out the decisions of the Douzaine, serving for between one and three years. The longer serving Constable is known as the Senior Constable and his or her colleague as the Junior Constable. The Douzaines levy an Occupiers Rate on properties to provide funding for running of the administration.

Guernsey's Church of England parishes fall under the See of Canterbury, having split from the Bishopric of Winchester in 2014. The biggest parish is Castel, while the most populated is St Peter Port.

== Economy ==
Financial services, such as banking, fund management, and insurance, account for about 37% of GDP. Tourism, manufacturing, and horticulture, mainly tomatoes and cut flowers, especially freesias, have been declining. Light tax and death duties make Guernsey a popular offshore finance centre for private-equity funds.

Guernsey does not have a Central Bank and it issues its own sterling coinage and banknotes. UK coinage and (English, Scottish and Northern Irish-faced) banknotes also circulate freely and interchangeably. Total island investment funds, used to fund pensions and future island costs, amount to £2.7billion as at June 2016. The island issued a 30-year bond in December 2015 for £330m, its first bond in 80 years. The island has been given a credit rating of AA-/A-1+ with a stable outlook from Standard & Poor's.

Guernsey has the official ISO 3166-1 alpha-2 code GG and the official ISO 3166-1 alpha-3 code GGY; vendors of economic and financial information, such as Reuters, will report products related to Guernsey using the alpha-3 code.

In March 2016, there were over 32,291 people employed in Guernsey, with 4,864 being self-employed and 2,453 employing businesses. 19.6% worked in the finance industry and median earnings were £31,215.

=== Infrastructure ===
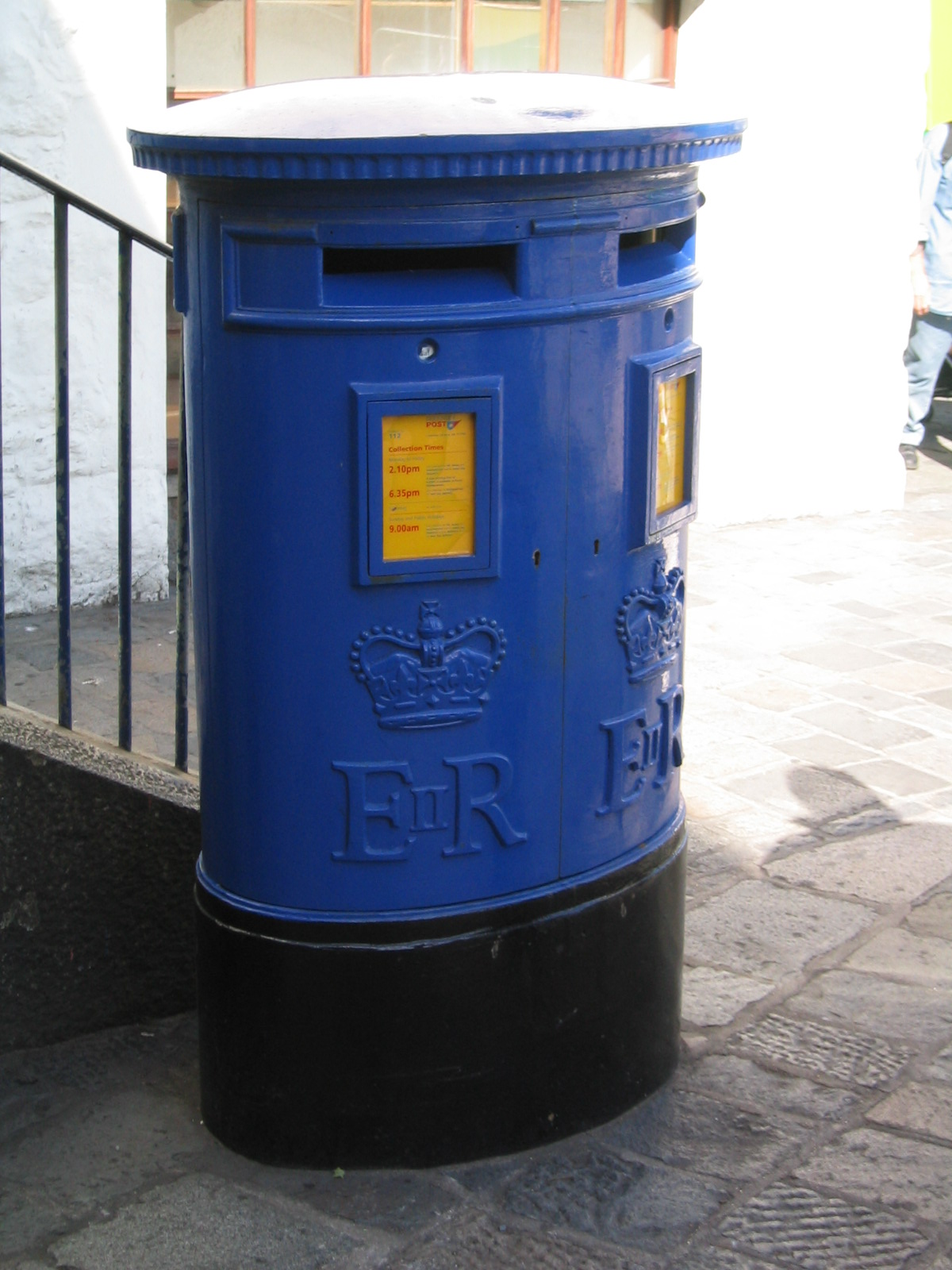
A Guernsey Post pillar box

Public services, such as water, wastewater, the two main harbours and the airport are owned and controlled by the States of Guernsey.

Electricity, and postal services have been commercialised and are now operated by companies Guernsey Electricity and Guernsey Post which are wholly owned by the States of Guernsey.

Gas is supplied by an independent private company.

In 1998, Guernsey and Jersey jointly formed the Channel Islands Electricity Grid to operate and manage the submarine cables between continental Europe and the Channel Islands. The installation of these cables was originally to provide the island with a secure form of backup power but now are effectively the primary source of power with the local diesel generators providing back-up.

Guernsey Telecoms, which provided telecommunications, was sold by the States to Cable & Wireless plc, rebranded as Sure and was sold to Batel co in April 2013. Newtel was the first alternative telecommunications company on the island and was acquired by Wave Telecom in 2010 and subsequently rebranded as Jersey Telecom. Airtel-Vodafone also provide a mobile network.

Both the Guernsey Post postal boxes (since 1969) and the telephone boxes (since 2002) are painted blue, but otherwise are identical to their British counterparts, the red pillar box and red telephone box. In 2009, the telephone boxes at the bus station were painted yellow just like they used to be when Guernsey Telecoms was state-owned. The oldest pillar box still in use in the British Isles can be found in Union Street, St Peter Port, and dates back to 1853.

=== Transport ===
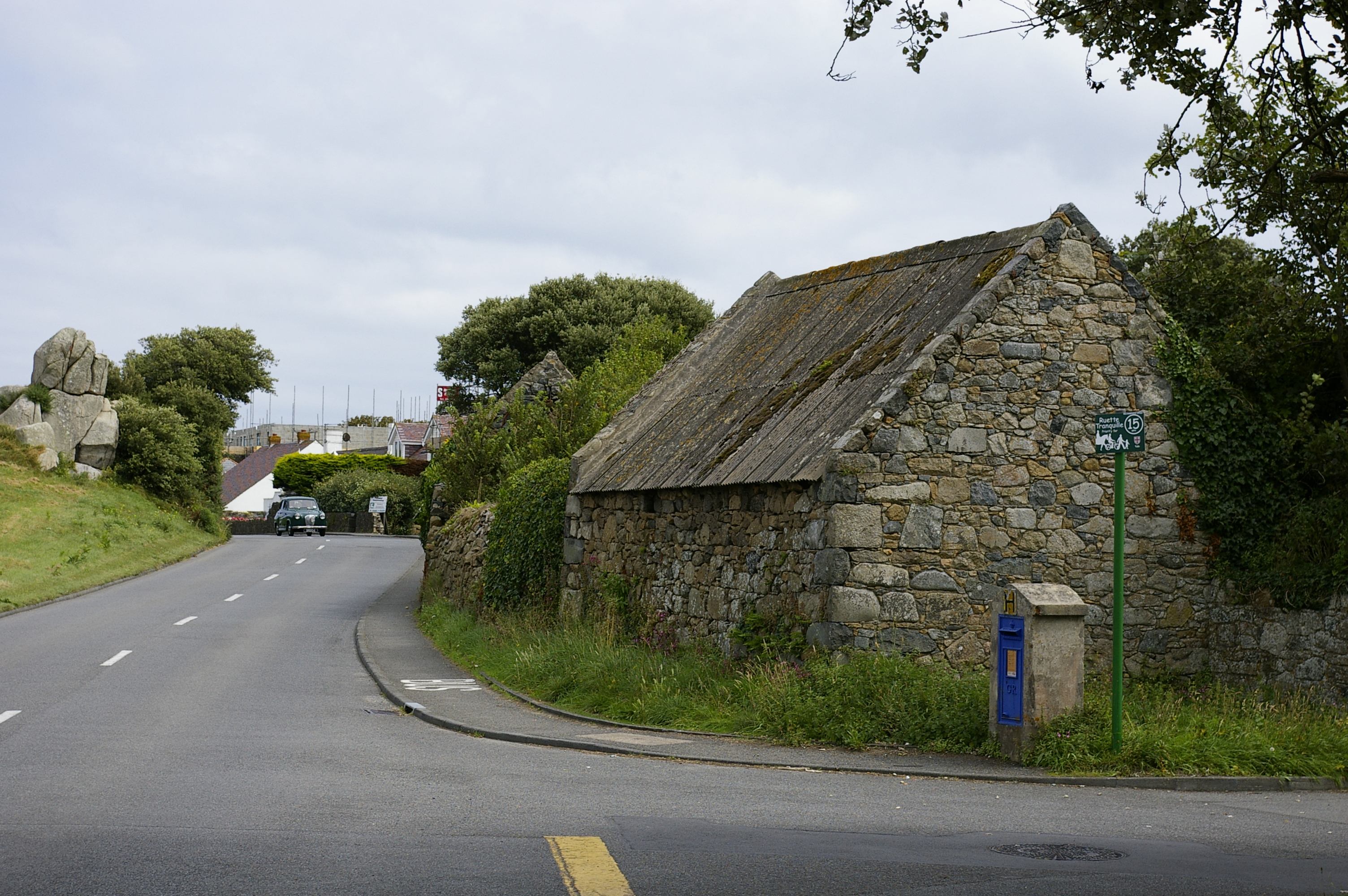
A typical road in Guernsey, with a Ruette Tranquille lane on the right

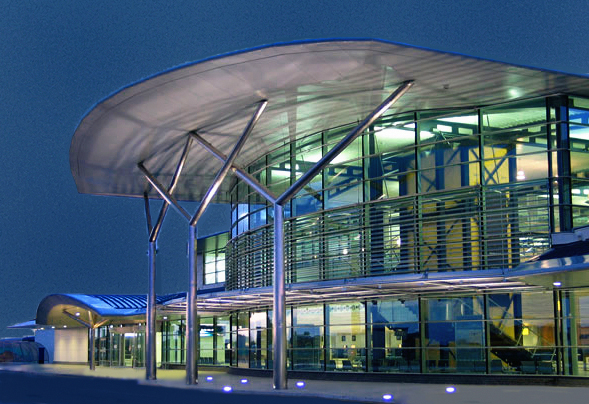
The Guernsey Airport terminal building

The primary mode of transport on the island is the motor vehicle. Guernsey has a road network consisting of 260 miles (418.4 km). There is also an extensive network of country lanes, some of which are branded under the name Ruette Tranquille, French for quiet street. Pedestrians, cyclists, and horse riders have priority with a recommended speed of 15mph, with campaigners lobbying for the recommended speed to be legally enforced. Like in mainland Britain, Guernsey has left-hand traffic.

Guernsey's bus network is operated by Stagecoach South West as Buses.gg, on behalf of the States of Guernsey's Committee for Environment and Infrastructure. During Stagecoach's first year of operation in 2025, 1.7 million bus journeys were made.

Guernsey Airport is the only airport in Guernsey and is located in the parish of Forest. It offers flights to the UK, Alderney, Jersey and international destinations. The States of Guernsey wholly own their own airline, Aurigny. The decision to purchase the airline was made to protect important air links to and from the island and the sale was completed on 15 May 2003.

Saint Peter Port Harbour is the main port on the island. Ferries to France, Jersey, the UK and across the Bailiwick operate to and from the harbour

=== Business ===
As of 2014, the finance industry forms the largest economic sector in Guernsey, generating around 40% of Guernsey's GDP and directly employing around 21% of its workforce. Banks began setting up operations in the island from the early 1960s onwards in order to avoid high onshore taxes and restrictive regulation. The industry regulator is the Guernsey Financial Services Commission, which was established in 1987. In 2015, the Bailiwick of Guernsey (in conjunction with Jersey) established the Channel Islands Financial Ombudsman (CIFO) to resolve consumer complaints about financial services provided in or from the Channel Islands of Jersey, Guernsey, Alderney and Sark.

Prior to the growth of the finance industry, the island's main industries were quarrying and horticulture. The latter particularly declined as a result of the oil-price shocks of the 1970s and the introduction of cheap North Sea gas that benefited Dutch growers. Guernsey is home to Specsavers Optical Group, and Healthspan also has its headquarters in Guernsey.

=== Tourism ===
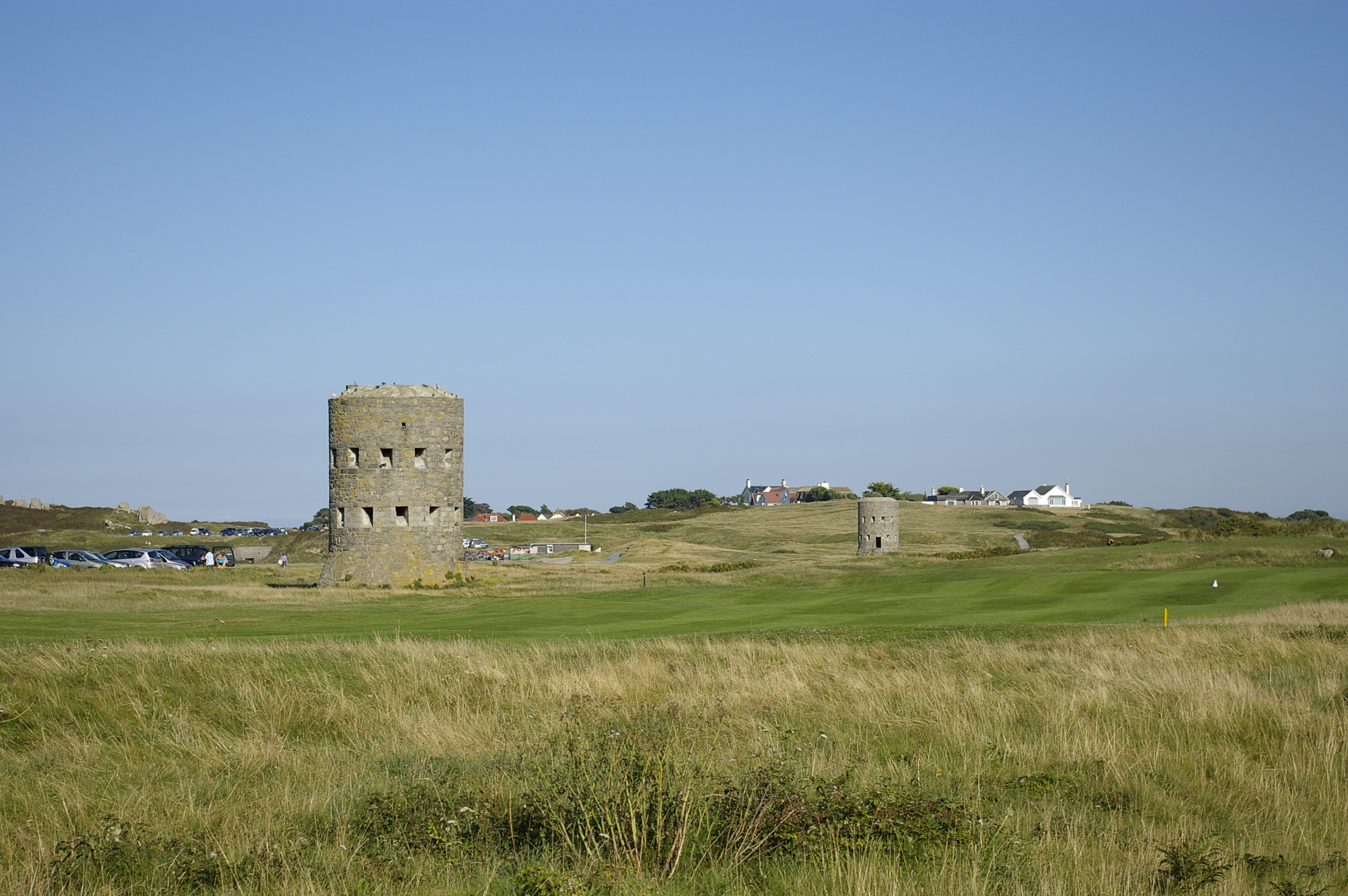
Loophole towers in Guernsey

Guernsey has been a tourist destination since at least the Victorian days, with the first tourist guide published in 1834. In the 19th century, two rail companies (London and South Western Railway and Great Western Railway) ran competing boats from the UK to St Peter Port, with a race to the only convenient berth. This was halted with the sinking of the SS Stella in 1899.

Guernsey enters Britain in Bloom with St Martin Parish winning the small town category twice in 2006 and 2011, Saint Peter Port winning the large coastal category in 2014 and St Peter's winning the small coastal prize in 2015. Herm has won Britain in Bloom categories several times: in 2002, 2008, and 2012, Herm won the Britain in Bloom Gold Award.

The military history of the island has left a number of fortifications, including Castle Cornet, Fort Grey, Guernsey loophole towers and a large collection of German fortifications with a number of museums.

The use of the roadstead in front of St Peter Port by over 100 cruise ships a year is bringing over 100,000 day-trip passengers to the island each year.

=== Taxation ===
Guernsey, Alderney and Sark each raise their own taxation. In 1949, Alderney transferred its fiscal rights to Guernsey.

Personal tax liability differs according to whether an individual is resident in the island or not. Individuals resident in the Jurisdiction of Guernsey (which does not include Sark) pay income tax at the rate of 20% on their worldwide income, whereas non-residents are only liable on income arising from activity or ownership within Guernsey. The income tax year in Guernsey aligns to the calendar year.

All Guernsey-resident individuals are subject to an upper limit on their tax liability, which is known as the "tax cap". Individuals may elect either of the following; Tax on non-Guernsey-source income originally restricted to £110,000, plus tax on Guernsey-source income (excluding Guernsey bank interest), or Taxed on worldwide income originally restricted to £220,000, including Guernsey-source income. Income derived from Guernsey land and property is excluded from the tax cap, as from 1 January 2015, and is subject to tax at the normal rate of 20%. Only one cap applies per married couple.

As from 1 January 2019, these tax caps have increased to £130,000 and £260,000 respectively. Guernsey has also introduced a new lower £50k tax cap for new residents for three years, subject to buying an Open Market Part A house with a document duty in excess of that amount, and not having lived in Guernsey or Alderney for three years prior.

Since 2008, Guernsey has operated three levels of corporation tax, depending on the source of the income.

- A 0% corporation tax rate on most companies.
- A 10% rate (income from banking business and, with effect from 1 January 2013, extended to domestic insurance business, fiduciary business, insurance intermediary business and insurance manager business).
- A 20% rate (income from trading activities regulated by the Office of the Director General of Utility Regulation, and income from the ownership of lands and buildings).

Guernsey levies no capital gains, inheritance, capital transfer, value added (VAT / TVA) or general withholding taxes. Guernsey has thus been described a tax haven. In the 2011 Budget, the UK announced that it would be ending Low Value Consignment Relief that was being used to sell goods VAT free to customers across the UK, with this legislation coming into force on 1 April 2012. Tax revenues represent 22.4% of GDP.

Social Insurance Scheme payments are based on gross earnings and apply to all persons over school leaving age. Employees are subject to a rate of 6.8%, whilst the self-employed pay 11.3%. Both have upper and lower earnings limits. Those classed as non-employed and under pension age pay a rate of 10.7%. Other categories have different rates.

== Society ==
=== Demographics ===
The population at the 2023 census was 64,781. The median age for males is 40 years and for females is 42 years. The population growth rate is 0.775% with 9.62 births/1,000 population, 8 deaths/1,000 population, and annual net migration of 6.07/1,000 population. The life expectancy is 80.1 years for males and 84.5 years for females. The Bailiwick ranked 10th in the world in 2015 with an average life expectancy of 82.47 years.

=== Structure of the population ===
Population Estimates by Sex and Age Group (31.III.2021):

Age group	Male	Female	Total	%
Total	31 381	32 067	63 448	100
0–4	1 403	1 295	2 698	4.25
5–9	1 692	1 602	3 294	5.19
10–14	1 723	1 581	3 304	5.21
15–19	1 620	1 512	3 132	4.94
20–24	1 866	1 778	3 644	5.74
25–29	1 976	1 869	3 845	6.06
30–34	2 080	2 052	4 132	6.51
35–39	2 033	1 902	3 935	6.20
40–44	1 913	1 987	3 900	6.15
45–49	2 095	2 212	4 307	6.79
50–54	2 378	2 601	4 979	7.85
55–59	2 467	2 494	4 961	7.82
60–64	2 059	2 172	4 231	6.67
65–69	1 763	1 729	3 492	5.50
70–74	1 730	1 882	3 612	5.69
75–79	1 095	1 211	2 306	3.63
80–84	858	1 030	1 888	2.98
85–89	419	687	1 106	1.74
90–94	172	347	519	0.82
95+	39	124	163	0.26
Age group	Male	Female	Total	Per cent
0–14	4 818	4 478	9 296	14.65
15–64	20 487	20 579	41 066	64.72
65+	6 076	7 010	13 086	20.62

=== Border control ===
The whole jurisdiction of Guernsey is part of the Common Travel Area.

For immigration and nationality purposes it is UK law, and not Guernsey law, which applies (technically the Immigration Act 1971, extended to Guernsey by Order in Council). Guernsey may not apply different immigration controls from the UK. After the United Kingdom left the European Union, from 1 January 2021 all EU nationals, other than British or Irish nationals, travelling for anything other than visitor purposes, are required to apply for a visa to enter the UK, Bailiwick of Guernsey, Jersey or the Isle of Man, prior to travel. People coming for employment to Guernsey require a Visa and a Population Management document.

=== Housing restrictions ===
Guernsey undertakes a population management mechanism using restrictions over who may work in the island through control of which properties people may live in. The housing market is split between "local market" properties and a set number of "open market" properties. Anyone may live in an open market property. Local market properties can only be lived in by those who qualify – either through being born in Guernsey (to at least one local parent), by obtaining a housing licence, or by virtue of sharing a property with someone who does qualify (living en famille).

Consequently, "open market'" properties are much more expensive both to buy and to rent. Housing licences are for fixed periods, often only valid for 4 years and only as long as the individual remains employed by a specified Guernsey employer. The licence will specify the type of accommodation and be specific to the address the person lives in, and is often subject to a police record check.

These restrictions apply equally regardless of whether the property is owned or rented, and only apply to occupation of the property. Thus, a person whose housing licence expires may continue to own a Guernsey property, but will no longer be able to live in it. There are no restrictions on who may own a property.

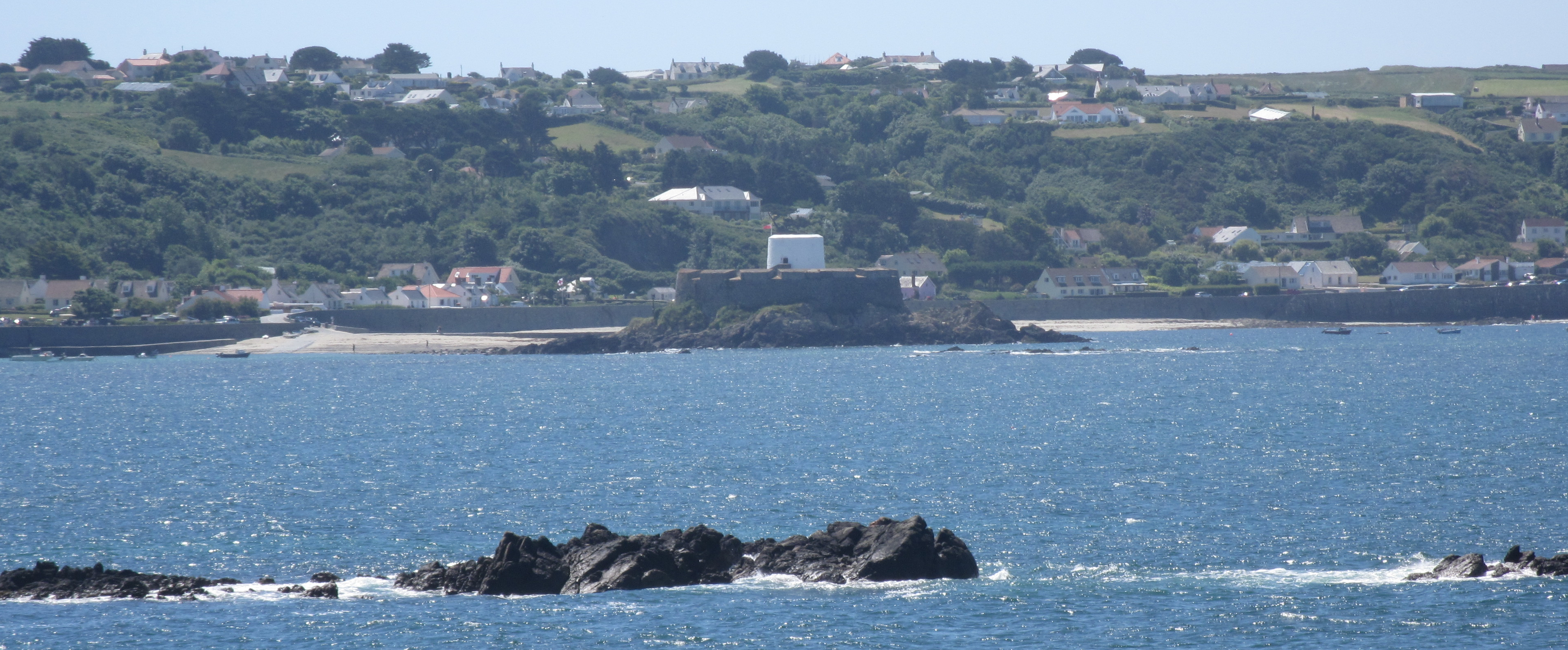
Coast of Guernsey

There are a number of routes to qualifying as a "local" for housing purposes. Generally, it is sufficient to be born to at least one Guernsey parent and to live in the island for ten years in a twenty-year period. In a similar way a partner (married or otherwise) of a local can acquire local status. Multiple problems arise following early separation of couples, especially if they have young children or if a local partner dies; in these situations, personal circumstances and compassion can add weight to requests for local status. Once "local" status has been achieved it remains in place for life. Even a lengthy period of residence outside Guernsey does not invalidate "local" housing status.

Although Guernsey's inhabitants are full British citizens, prior to the UK's withdrawal from the EU, an endorsement restricted the right of establishment in other European Union states was placed in the passport of British citizens connected solely with the Channel Islands and Isle of Man. If it was classified with "Islander Status", the British passport was endorsed as follows: 'The holder is not entitled to benefit from EU provisions relating to employment or establishment'. Those who had a parent or grandparent born in the United Kingdom itself (England, Scotland, Wales and Northern Ireland), or had lived in the United Kingdom for 5 years, were not subject to this restriction.

== Education ==
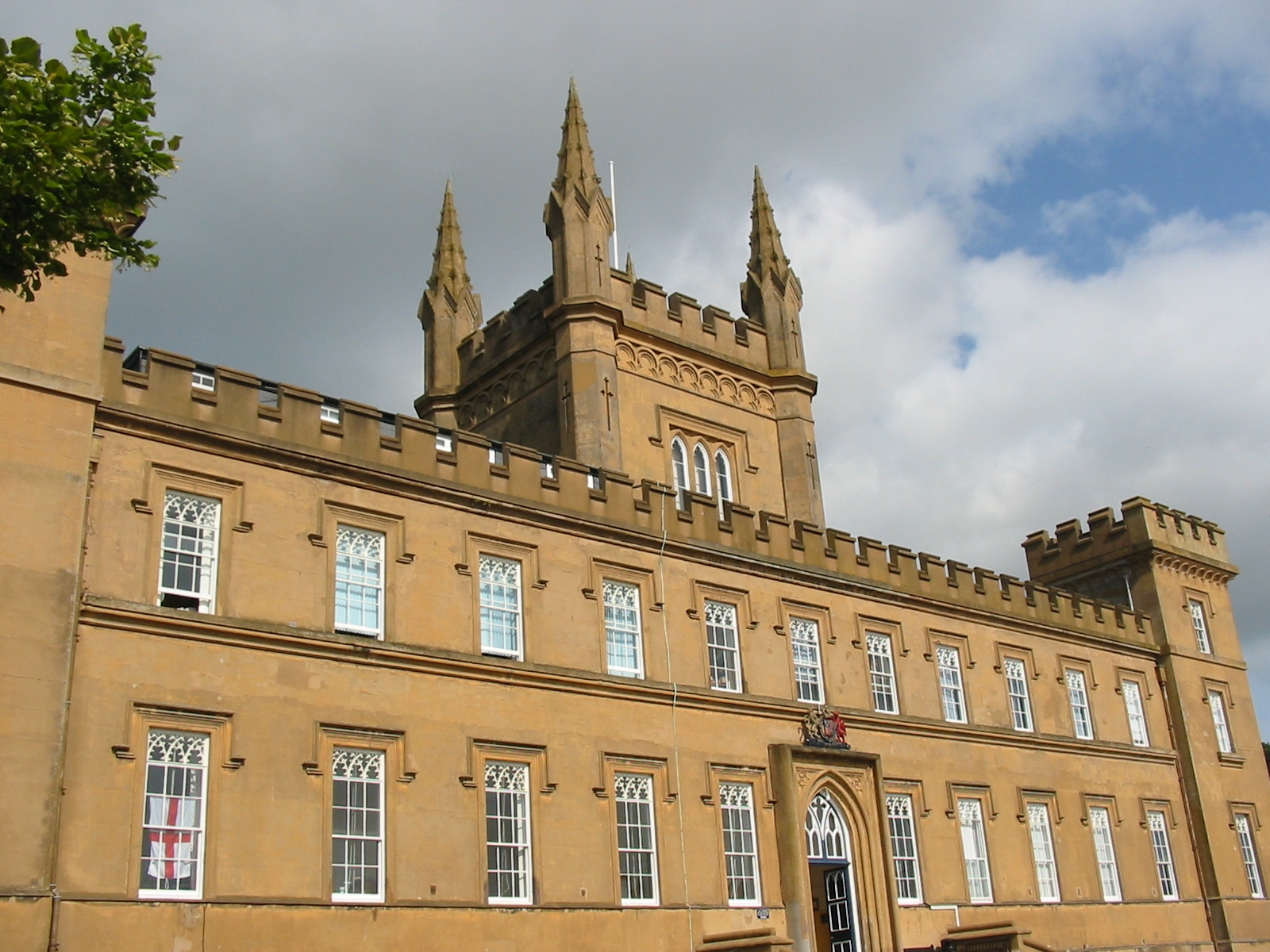
Elizabeth College, in St Peter Port, Guernsey

Teaching in Guernsey is based on the English National Curriculum. There are 10 primary schools, plus two junior schools and three infant schools. As of 2022, the island no longer has the 11-plus exam, which was used to transfer pupils to one of four 11–16 secondary schools, or a co-educational grammar school. There are three fee-paying colleges with lower schools, for which pupils over 11 receive grant support from the States of Guernsey. In 2016, the States of Guernsey voted to end the use of the 11-plus exams from 2019 onwards. It is also responsible for education on the neighbouring islands.

In 2008, the school-leaving age was raised. The earliest date is the last Friday in June in the year a pupil turns 16, in line with England, Wales and Northern Ireland. This means pupils will be between 15 and 10 months and 16 and 10 months before being able to leave. Prior to this, pupils could leave school at the end of the term in which they turned 14, if they so wished: a letter was required to be sent to the Education department to confirm this. This option was undertaken by relatively few pupils, the majority choosing to complete their GCSEs and then either begin employment or continue their education.

Post-GCSE pupils have a choice of transferring to the state-run Sixth Form Centre at the La Mare site, or to the independent colleges for academic AS/A Levels/International Baccalureate Diploma Programme. They also have the option to study vocational subjects at the island's Guernsey College of Further Education.

There are no universities in the island. Students who attend university in the United Kingdom receive state support towards both maintenance and tuition fees. In 2007, the Education Department received the approval of the States Assembly to introduce student contributions to the costs of higher education, in the form of student loans, as apply in the UK.

Immediately after the general election of 2008, the States Assembly voted in favour of a Requête which proposed abolishing the student loans scheme on the grounds that it was expensive to run and would potentially discourage students from going to, and then returning to the island from, university. In 2012, the Education Department reported to the States Assembly that it had no need to re-examine the basis of higher education funding at the present time.

== Culture ==
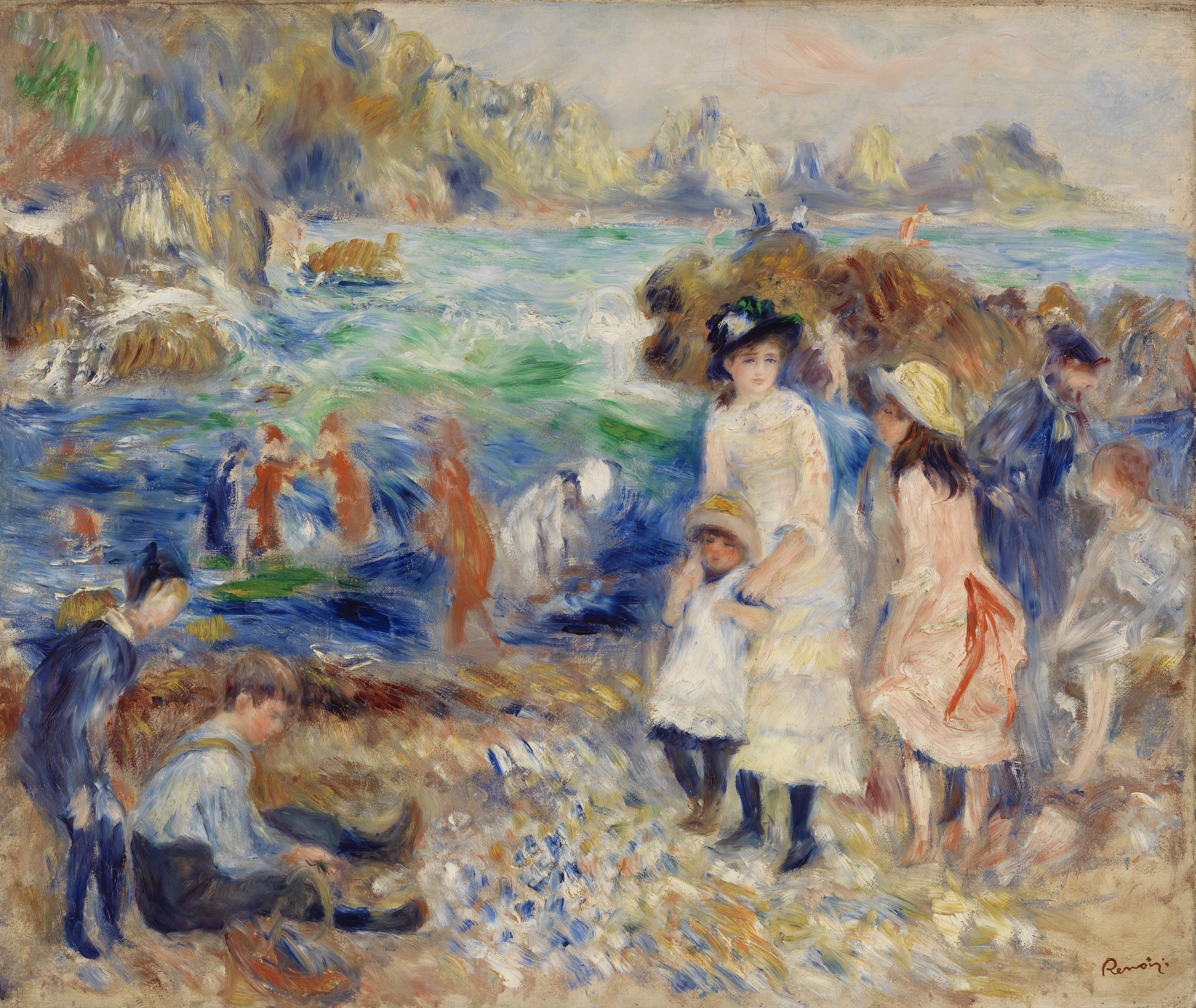
Children on the Beach of Guernsey (1883) by Pierre-Auguste Renoir

The French impressionist painter Pierre-Auguste Renoir visited the island in late summer 1883. While on the island, he painted fifteen pictures of the views on the island, all featuring the bay and beach of Moulin Huet on the south coast.

A Guernsey cow

Guernsey cattle are an internationally famous icon of the island. As well as being prized for its rich creamy milk, which is claimed to hold health benefits over milk from other breeds, Guernsey cattle are increasingly being raised for their distinctively flavoured and rich yellowy-fatted beef, with butter made from the milk of Guernsey cows also having a distinctive yellow colour. Since the 1960s the number of individual islanders raising these cattle for private supply has diminished significantly, but Guernsey steers can still be occasionally seen grazing on L'Ancresse common.

Guernsey hosts a breed of goat known as the Royal Golden Guernsey Goat, distinguished by its golden-coloured coat. At the end of the Second World War, the Golden Guernsey had almost been rendered extinct due to interbreeding on the island. The survival of this breed is largely credited to the work of a single woman, Miriam Milbourne, who successfully hid her herd from the Germans during the occupation.

Although no longer considered to be critically endangered, the breed remains on the watchlist of the Rare Breeds Survival Trust. The traditional explanation for the donkey (âne in French and Guernésiais) is the steepness of St Peter Port streets that necessitated beasts of burden for transport (in contrast to the flat terrain of the rival capital of Saint Helier in Jersey), although it is also used in reference to Guernsey inhabitants' stubbornness. In turn, Guernseymen traditionally refer to Jerseymen as crapauds ("toads").

The so-called Guernsey lily, Nerine sarniensis, is also used as a symbol of the island, although this species was introduced to the island from South Africa.

=== Local food ===
A local delicacy is the ormer (Haliotis tuberculata), a variety of abalone harvested under strict laws from beaches at low spring tides. Traditional Guernsey recipes include a stew called Guernsey bean jar, notably served at the annual Viaer Marchi festival. Its chief ingredients include haricot and butter beans, pork, and shin beef. Guernsey gâche (pronounced "gosh") is a special bread made with raisins, sultanas and mixed peel. Gâche mélée is a dessert consisting of spiced, chopped apples suspended in a sponge mix.

=== Languages ===
English is the language in general use by the majority of the population. In the 2001 census, Guernésiais, the Norman language of the island, was spoken fluently by about 2% of the population. 14% of the population claim some understanding of the language. Guernésiais and French were recognised as official languages in August 2020.

Until the early 20th century, French was the only official language of the Bailiwick. All deeds for the sale and purchase of real estate in Guernsey were written in French until 1971. Family and place names reflect this linguistic heritage. George Métivier, a poet, wrote in Guernésiais. The loss of the island's language and the Anglicisation of its culture, which began in the 19th century and proceeded inexorably for a century, accelerated sharply when the majority of the island's school children were evacuated to the UK for five years during the German occupation of 1940–45.

=== Literature ===
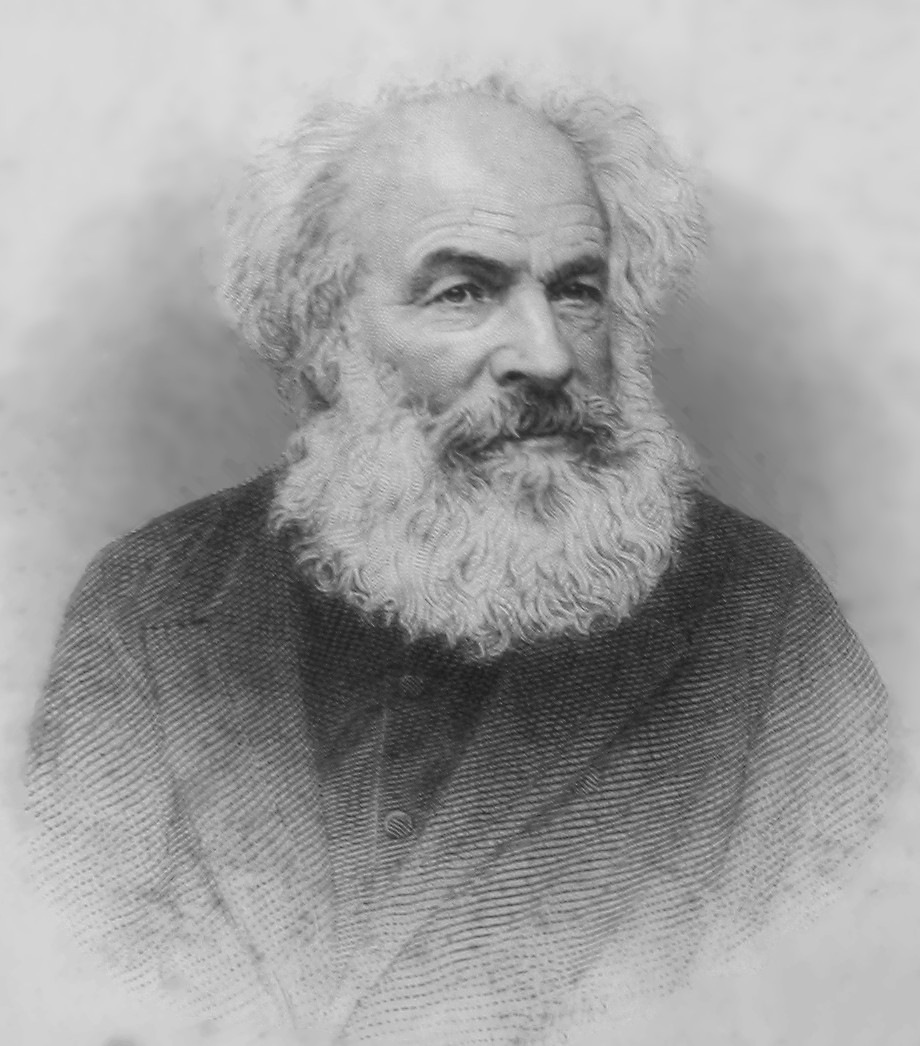
George Métivier was a Guernsey poet dubbed the "Guernsey Burns"

Victor Hugo, having arrived on Halloween 1855, wrote some of his best-known works while in exile in Guernsey, including Les Misérables. His home in St Peter Port, Hauteville House, is now a museum administered by the city of Paris. In 1866, he published a novel set on Guernsey, Travailleurs de la Mer (Toilers of the Sea), which he dedicated to the island. Guernsey was his home for fifteen years.

Mabel Collins (1851–1927), a theosophist and prolific author, was born in St Peter Port.

Guernseyman G. B. Edwards wrote a critically acclaimed novel, The Book of Ebenezer Le Page, that was published in 1981, including insights into Guernsey life during the 20th century. In September 2008, a blue plaque was affixed to the house on the Braye Road where Edwards was raised.

Henry Watson Fowler moved to Guernsey in 1903. He and his brother Francis George Fowler composed The King's English, the Concise Oxford Dictionary and much of Modern English Usage on the island.

The Guernsey Literary and Potato Peel Pie Society, a novel by Mary Ann Shaffer and Annie Barrows, describes the Occupation of Germans during World War II. Written in 2009, it is about a writer who begins corresponding with residents of the island, and becomes compelled to visit the island.

=== Film ===
A film adaptation of The Guernsey Literary and Potato Peel Pie Society, starring Lily James and Jessica Brown Findlay, was released in 2018.

The 2022 British psychological thriller film Marooned Awakening, starring Murray McArthur, Tilly Keeper and Tim McInnerny was co-written by and stars Guernseyman Cameron Ashplant. He produced the film through Across the Channel Productions Ltd, alongside London-based director Musaab Mustafa, and Guernsey co-producers Frances and Roger Le Tissier of Ivy Gate Films. Principal photography was completed entirely on Guernsey in September 2021. The film premiered on the island at Beau Séjour Theatre on 3 September 2022.

=== Media ===
Local TV coverage is provided by BBC Channel Islands and ITV Channel Television. There are three relay transmitters in Guernsey (St Peter Port, Les Touillets and Torteval) which are transmitted from the Fremont Point transmitter.

Guernsey has two radio stations: BBC Radio Guernsey on 93.2 FM and Island FM on 104.7 FM, which both broadcast from St. Peter Port.

The main local newspaper for the island is served by the Guernsey Press.

=== Sport ===
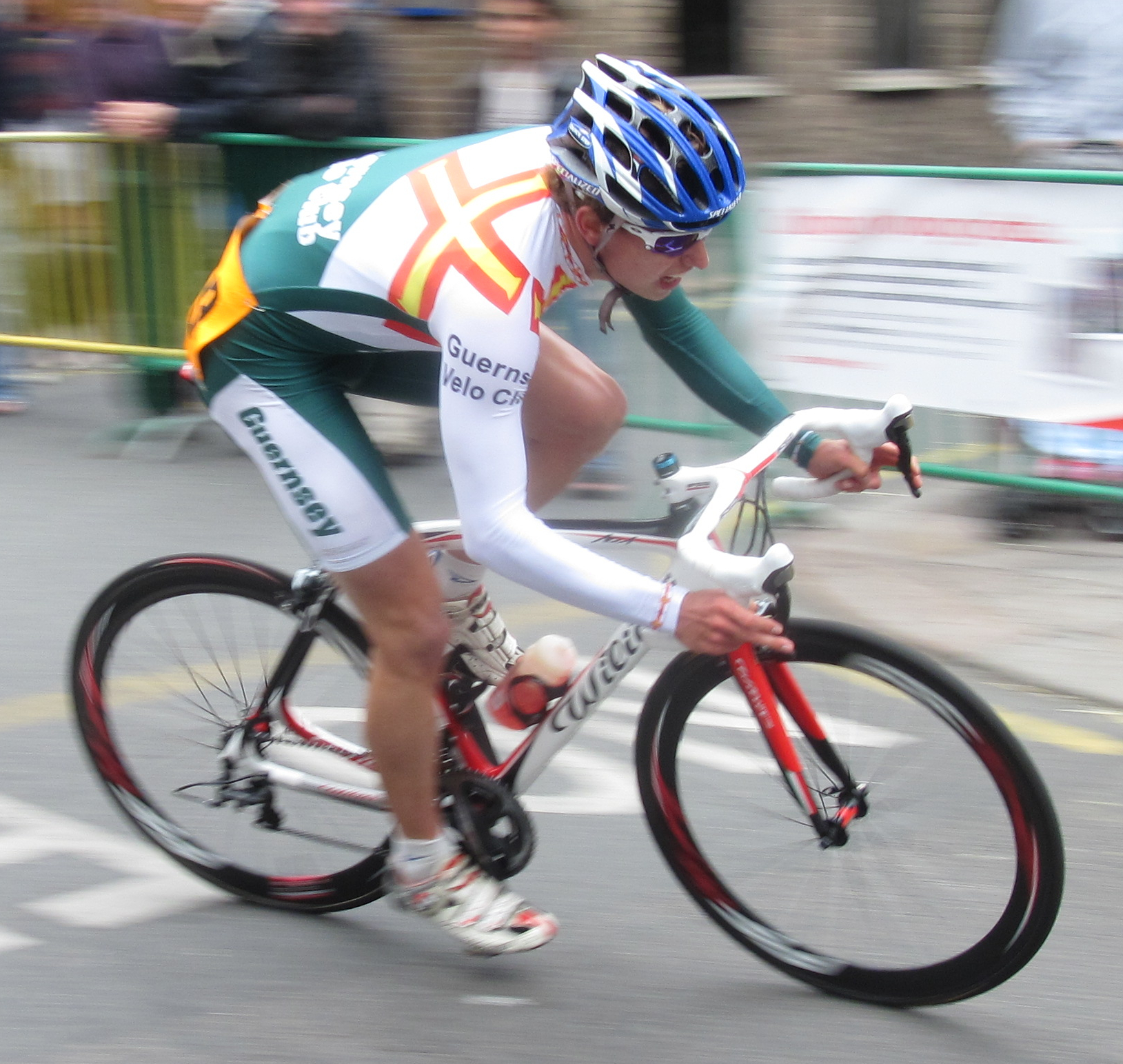
Joshua Gosselin racing for the Guernsey Velo Club

Guernsey participates in the biennial Island Games, which it hosted in 1987, 2003 and 2023 at Footes Lane. Guernsey has also participated as a country in its own right in Commonwealth Games since 1970. Its first medals came in 1982 with its first gold in 1990.

In those sporting events where Guernsey does not have international representation, but the British Home Nations are competing separately, highly skilled islanders may choose to compete for any of the Home Nations. There are restrictions on subsequent transfers to represent other Home Nations. The football player Matt Le Tissier, for example, could have played for the Scottish or Welsh football teams, but opted to play for England instead.

Football in Guernsey is run by the Guernsey Football Association. The top tier of Guernsey football is the FNB Priaulx League where there are eight teams (Alderney, Belgrave Wanderers, Northerners, Sylvans, St Martin's, Rovers, Rangers and Vale Recreation). The second tier is the Jackson League. In the 2011–12 season, Guernsey F.C. was formed and entered the Combined Counties League Division 1, becoming the first Channel Island club ever to compete in the English leagues. Guernsey became division champions comfortably on 24 March 2012, they won the Combined Counties Premier Challenge Cup on 4 May 2012.

Their second season saw them promoted again on the final day in front of 1,754 'Green Lions' fans, this time to Division One South of the Isthmian League, despite their fixtures being heavily affected not only by poor winter weather, but by their notable progression to the semi-finals of the FA Vase cup competition. They play in level 8 of the English football pyramid. The Corbet Football Field, donated by Jurat Wilfred Corbet in 1932, has fostered the sport greatly over the years. Recently, the island upgraded to a larger, better-quality stadium, in Footes Lane.

Rugby union is also a popular sport in Guernsey, the main club is accredited and governed by the Rugby Football Union (RFU). Guernsey RFC has 2 senior men’s teams (Guernsey Raiders and St Jacques Vikings), a Senior Ladies team, a Colts U18’s team and multiple other junior teams for both boys and girls. The main men’s team, the Raiders, currently play in National 2 East, which is a semi-professional league at level 4 of the RFU’s tiered league structure. The Vikings currently play in Counties 1 Hampshire (Level 7) and have had a string of promotions in the last few seasons. At the end of each season, all Guernsey teams will compete in the Siam Cup, which was first played in 1920 between Jersey and Guernsey. The Siam Cup is the second oldest trophy in the world after the Calcutta Cup and each year’s competition continues to reflect the sporting rivalry between Jersey and Guernsey.

Guernsey has the second oldest tennis club in the world, at Kings, founded in 1857,, with courts built in 1875. The island has produced a world class tennis player in Heather Watson as well as professional squash players in Martine Le Moignan, Lisa Opie and Chris Simpson.

Guernsey was declared an affiliate member by the International Cricket Council (ICC) in 2005 and an associate member in 2008. The Guernsey cricket team plays in the World Cricket League and European Cricket Championship as well as the Sussex Cricket League.

Various forms of motorsport take place on the island, including races on the sands on Vazon beach as well as a quarter-mile "sprint" along the Vazon coast road. Le Val des Terres, a steeply winding road rising south from St Peter Port to Fort George, is often the focus of both local and international hill-climb races. The 2005, 2006 and 2007 World Touring Car Champion Andy Priaulx is a Guernseyman.

The racecourse on L'Ancresse Common was re-established in 2004 after a gap of 13 years, with the first new race occurring on 2 May 2005. Races are held on most May Day bank holidays, with competitors from Guernsey as well as Jersey, France and the UK participating. Sea angling around Guernsey and the other islands in the Bailiwick from shore or boat is a popular pastime for both locals and visitors with the Bailiwick boasting multiple UK records.

== See also ==
- Index of Guernsey-related articles
- Bibliography of Guernsey
- List of people from Guernsey
- United Kingdom–Crown Dependencies Customs Union
- Little Chapel
