= Edward Chaney =

British cultural historian (born 1951)

Professor Edward Paul de Gruyter Chaney PhD FSA FRHistS
- Born: 1951 (age 74–75); Hillingdon, Middlesex, England
- Occupation: University professor
- Title: Professor of Fine and Decorative Arts, Southampton Solent University
- Board member of: Governor of University Hospital Southampton NHS Foundation Trust
- Spouse: Lisa Chaney
- Children: 2, including Olivia Chaney
- Awards: Commendatore of the Italian Republic

Academic background
- Education: PhD
- Alma mater: Warburg Institute, University of London

Academic work
- Discipline: Cultural history
- Sub-discipline: Art, architecture, collecting, Anglo-Italian relations
- Institutions: Southampton Solent University
- Main interests: Grand Tour, Anglo-Italian Cultural Relations, History of Collecting, Inigo Jones, Legacy of Ancient Egypt, 20th century British Art
- Notable works: Evolution of the Grand Tour (1998)
- Website: https://www.solent.ac.uk/staff-profiles/academic-profiles/edward-chaney/edward-chaney

Edward Chaney FSA FRHistS (born 1951) is a British cultural historian. He is Professor Emeritus at Solent University and Honorary Professor at University College London (School of European Languages, Culture and Society (SELCS) – Centre for Early Modern Exchanges London). He is an authority on the evolution of the Grand Tour, Anglo-Italian cultural relations, the history of collecting, Inigo Jones and the legacy of ancient Egypt. He also publishes on aspects of 20th-century British art. In 2003, he was made a Commendatore of the Italian Republic. He is the biographer of Gerald Basil Edwards, author of The Book of Ebenezer Le Page which he succeeded in publishing following the author's death in 1976. This has since been recognised as a twentieth-century classic.

== Life ==
=== Education ===
Chaney was educated at Leighton Park School, Reading, Ealing School of Art and subsequently gained a first class degree in History of Art at Reading University before completing an MPhil and PhD at the Warburg Institute, University of London. He also has a Laurea from the University of Pisa. He married biographer Lisa Jacka in Paris, 1973, and has two daughters, Jessica Chaney, former art director of Apollo magazine, and singer-songwriter Olivia Chaney. The marriage was dissolved in 2002.

=== Work ===
From 1978 to 1985 Chaney lived in Florence where he was a 'Ricercatore' at the European University Institute, adjunct assistant professor at Georgetown University's Villa Le Balze, an Associate of Harvard University's Villa I Tatti and taught at the University of Pisa.

From 1985 to 1990 he was the Shuffrey Research Fellow in Architectural History at Lincoln College, Oxford before working for English Heritage as historian to the London region and lecturing in the History of Art at Oxford Brookes University. In 1997 was appointed Professor Fine and Decorative Arts at the Southampton Institute, now Southampton Solent University, where he established the History of Collecting Research Centre.

In 2014 he was appointed Visiting Professor of Art History at the New College of the Humanities and January–March 2015 Fernand Braudel Senior Fellow at the European University Institute, Florence.

He was co-founder and editor of Journal of Anglo-Italian Studies, and has served on the Executive Committee of the British-Italian Society, the International Association of Art Critics (AICA) and the Catholic Record Society.

He currently serves on the Editorial Boards of:

- The Journal of Wyndham Lewis Studies
- The British Art Journal
- The Court Historian

In 2016 he was appointed Governor of University Hospital Southampton NHS Foundation Trust.

== Bibliography ==
=== Books ===
- Oxford, China and Italy: Writings in Honour of Sir Harold Acton (ed. with Neil Ritchie, Thames and Hudson, 1984)
- The Grand Tour and the Great Rebellion: Richard Lassels and 'The Voyage of Italy' in the Seventeenth Century (C.I.R.V.I., Slatkine, 1985)
- A Traveller's Companion to Florence (intro Harold Acton, Constable, 1986; 2nd ed. Constable and Robinson, 2002)
- England and the Continental Renaissance (ed with Peter Mack: Boydell Press, 1990)
- English Architecture: Public and Private (ed with John Bold: Hambledon Press, 1993)
- The Evolution of the Grand Tour: Anglo-Italian Cultural Relations since the Renaissance (1998; 2nd, paperback edition, Routledge, 2000)
- The Stuart Portrait: Status and Legacy (with Godfrey Worsdale; Paul Holberton Publishing, 2001).
- The Evolution of English Collecting: Receptions of Italian Art during the Tudor and Stuart Periods (Yale University Press, 2003)
- Richard Eurich 1903–1992: A Visionary Artist (with Christine Clearkin, Paul Holberton, 2003)
- Introduction, updated bibliography and corrections to new edition of John Hale's England and the Italian Renaissance (Blackwell, Oxford 2005)
- Inigo Jones's 'Roman Sketchbook', 2 vols. (Roxburghe Club, 2006)
- William Rose: Tradition and an Individual Talent (Bath, 2009)
- The Jacobean Grand Tour: Early Stuart Travellers in Europe (with Timothy Wilks; I.B. Tauris, 2014).
- Genius Friend: G.B. Edwards and The Book of Ebenezer Le Page (Blue Ormer, 2015)
- Florence: A Traveller's Reader (Robinson, 2018)

== Media ==
- Broadcast appearances on BBC Radio 4 programmes: Start the Week, Woman's Hour, Science Now and In Our Time ('The Grand Tour' – 30 May 2002),
- He has acted as consultant for programmes on the Grand Tour by Brian Sewell and Kevin McCloud (Channel 4) and 'Great British Art Collectors – Lady Helen Rosslyn' on BBC4 (2012–13).
- He has contributed articles to: Apollo, The Burlington Magazine, Country Life, The Daily Telegraph, The English Historical Review, History Today, The Independent, Literary Review, The Milton Quarterly, Modern Painters, The Salisbury Review, The Spectator, Times Higher Education, The Times Literary Supplement, The Victorian.

== Awards ==
- Leverhulme European Studentship. 1978-9.
- Huntington Library Research Fellowship (British Academy travel funded). 1995.
- Mellon British School at Rome Award. 2006.
- Leverhulme Major Research Fellowship: 2010–2012. 'Polytheism and its Discontents: Cultural Memories of Egypt in England.'.
- British Council: travel expenses to International Travel and Illustration conference (keynote speaker), Bangalore, India, November 2014.
- Fernand Braudel Senior Research Fellowship; European University Institute, Florence; January–March 2015.
