= Anglia (magazine) =

British propaganda magazine in the Soviet Union (1962–1992)

- Editor-in-chief: Ned Thomas
- Former editors: Wright Miller (1962–1967)
- Categories: Propaganda magazine
- Frequency: Quarterly
- Publisher: Information Research Department
- Founded: 1962
- Final issue: 1992
- Country: United Kingdom
- Language: Russian

Anglia was a magazine published by the Information Research Department, a propaganda agency of the British Foreign Office from 1962 to 1992. The title of the magazine was a reference to the familiar name for Britain in the Soviet Union. Similar naming procedures were employed for other propaganda periodicals such as Amerika and Jugoslavija, both of which were also distributed in the Soviet Union.

== History and profile ==
Anglia was launched by Information Research Department in 1962. The magazine was printed in the United Kingdom and distributed in the Soviet Union. It was published quarterly.

The founding editor-in-chief of Anglia was Wright Miller who was replaced in 1967 by Ned Thomas. The magazine was a tool for visual diplomacy. It adopted a positive propaganda approach and featured articles in which the United Kingdom was shown as a wealthy, progressive and democratic country. The magazine also included articles about British literature and music and children's literature by British writers.

Anglia folded in 1992.
