= List of people from Guernsey =

This is a selected list of notable people with links to the Bailiwick of Guernsey, in the Channel Islands.

== 16th century ==
- Catherine Cauchés, Guillemine Gilbert and Perotine Massey (?–1556), burned at the stake for heresy; Perotine Massey gave birth while tied to the stake
- Sir Henry de Vic (1599–1671), a founding member of the Royal Society, Chancellor of the Order of the Garter

== 17th century ==
- Edmund Andros (1637–1714), colonial administrator, governor of the Dominion of New England in America

== 18th century ==
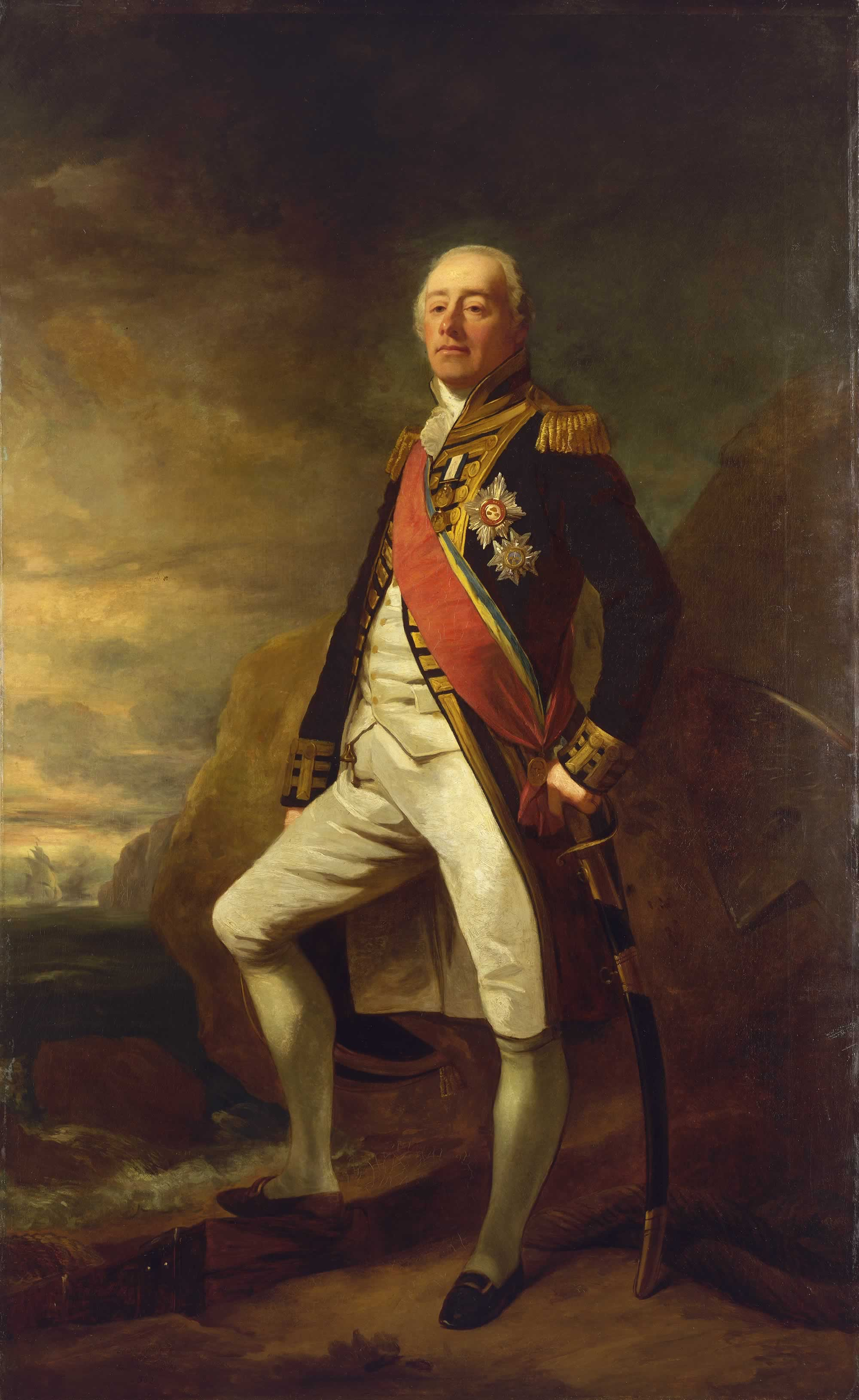
Vice-Admiral James Saumarez was the commander of the Royal Navy in the Baltic campaign of 1808–1814 that secured British trade to the region

- Peter Perchard (1729–1806), privateer, goldsmith and merchant, served as Lord Mayor of London in 1806
- Paul Le Mesurier (1755–1805), merchant, Lord Mayor of London 1793-4
- James Saumarez (1757–1836), Vice Admiral of the Blue and first Baron de Saumarez
- Major-General Sir Thomas Saumarez (1760–1845), commandant at Halifax, commander-in-chief of New Brunswick during the War of 1812
- Daniel de Lisle Brock (1762–1842), chief civic magistrate of Guernsey and brother of Sir Isaac Brock
- Richard Saumarez (1764–1835), British surgeon and medical author
- Major-General John Gaspard Le Marchant (1766–1812), founder of the first British military college
- Sir Isaac Brock (1769–1812), Major General and Lieutant-Governor of Upper Canada, hero of Upper Canada
- John MacCulloch (1773–1835), geologist in the Channel Islands, England and Scotland
- John Le Mesurier (1781–1843), Major General and governor of Alderney
- Peter Paul Dobree (1782–1825), English classical scholar and critic
- Frederick Corbin Lukis (1788–1871), antiquary and natural historian including botany, geology, conchology, and science
- George Métivier (1790–1881), the island's national poet
- Margaret Ann Neve (1792–1903), first validated female supercentenarian and oldest ever Guernsey-born person, 110 years 321 days
- Thomas de la Rue (1793–1866), printer and stationer
- John Jeremie (1795–1841), British judge, diplomat and abolitionist
- Ferdinand Brock Tupper (1795–1874), historian
- Peter Broun (1797–1846), first Colonial Secretary of Western Australia, and a member of Western Australia's first Legislative Council
- Samuel Elliott Hoskins (1799–1888), physician

== 19th century ==
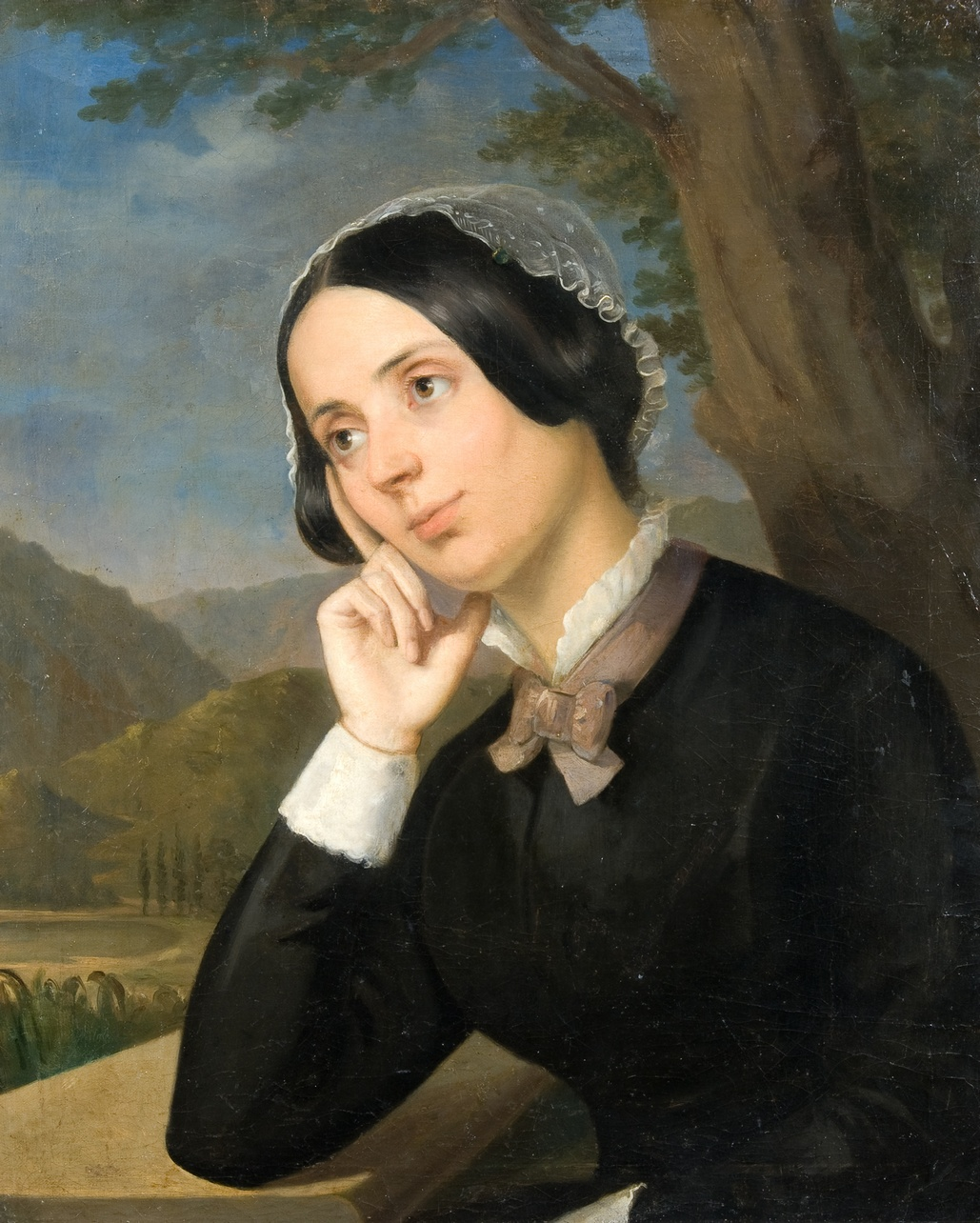
Constantin Daniel Rosenthal's portrait of Maria Rosetti

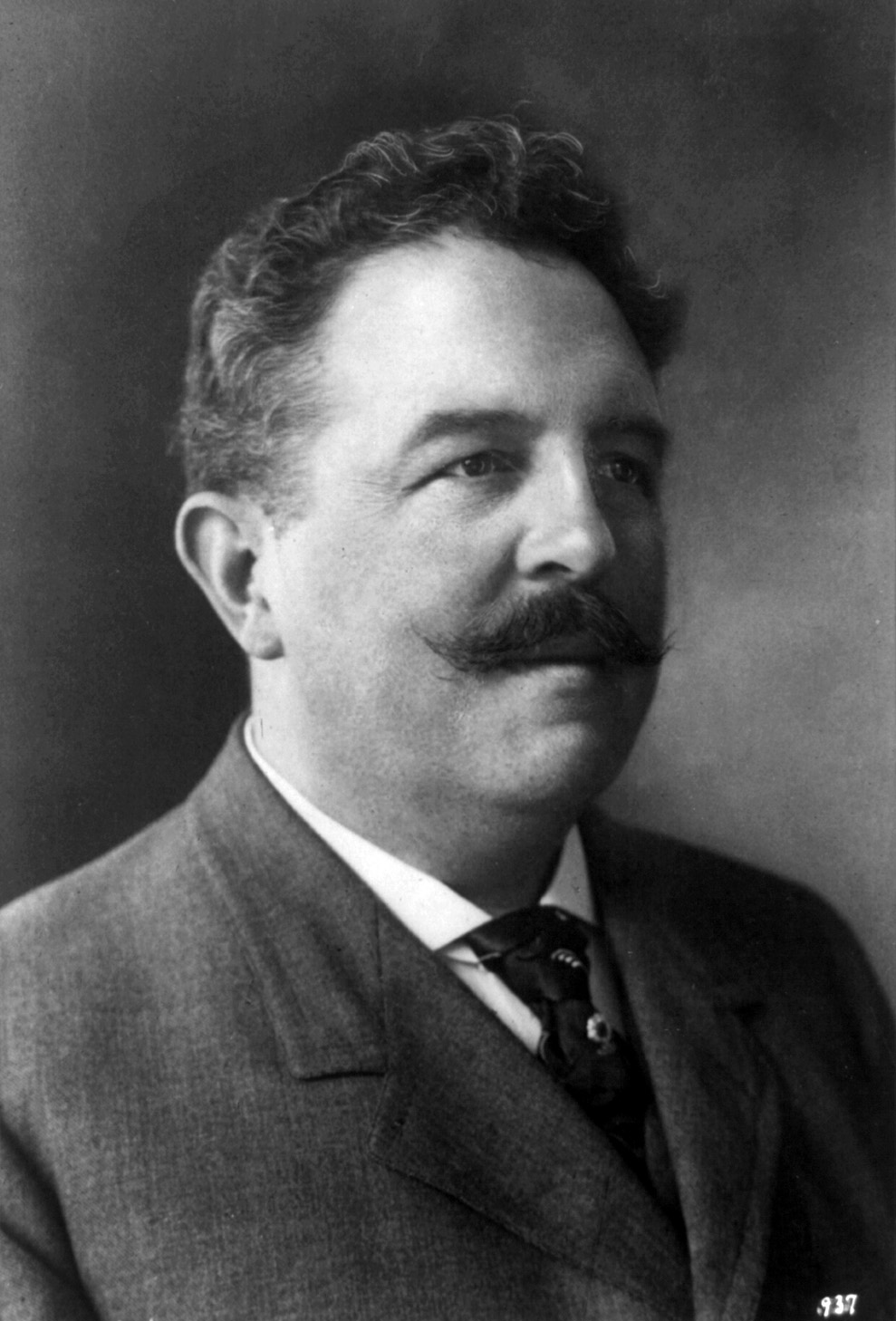
Victor Herbert in 1906

- Sampson Avard (1800–1869), leader of a band of Mormon vigilantes called the Danites
- William Le Lacheur (1802–1863), sea captain and developed the coffee business in Costa Rica.
- James Jeremie (1802–1872), Dean of Lincoln
- Bonamy Price (1807–1888), political economist
- Warren De la Rue (1815–1889), astronomer and chemist
- Francis Colborne (1817–1895), Commander of British Troops in China, Hong Kong and the Straits Settlements
- Paul Jacob Naftel (1817–1891), artist
- Edmund Kennedy (1818–1848), explorer
- Jasper Hume Nicolls (1818–1877), Canadian Anglican priest and first Principal of Bishop's College
- Maria Rosetti (1819–1893) née Grant, political activist and journalist
- Effingham Grant (1820–1892), diplomat and businessman, brother of Maria Rosetti
- Robert Carey (1821–1883), Major-General in the British Army
- John Elias Collings (1821–1886), General in the British Army
- George Jackson Carey (1822–1872), Major-General in the British Army
- Peter le Page Renouf (1822–1897), Egyptologist
- Denys Corbet (1826–1909), Guernésiais poet
- Duncan Charles Home (1828–1857), Victoria Cross recipient
- Terence O'Brien (1830–1903), surveyor, engineer and colonial governor of Newfoundland
- Walter Wren (1833–1898), member of Parliament
- John Richard Magrath (1839–1930), British academic
- Frederick Moynihan (1843–1910), sculptor
- Mrs. Bartle Teeling (1851–1906), writer
- Mabel Collins (1851–1927), theosophist and author
- John Frederick McCrea (1854–1894), Victoria Cross recipient
- Theodore Fink (1855–1942), elected to the Victorian Legislative Assembly, Australia
- Uchter Knox, 5th Earl of Ranfurly (1856–1933), Uchter Knox, Governor of New Zealand
- Samuel Mauger (1857–1936), Australian social reformer and politician
- Victor Herbert (1859–1924), musician
- James Arnold (1859–1929), New Zealand Member of Parliament
- Fanny Davies (1861–1934), pianist
- Havilland de Sausmarez (1861–1941), judge of various British courts in Africa and Asia, the Ottoman Empire and China
- Martha Sarah Bidmead (1862-1940), Australian nurse of the Boer War
- Sir Henry Beauvoir De Lisle (1864–1955), British Army general
- Ernest Roberts (1868–1913), Labor member of the Australian House of Representatives
- Lewis Stratford Tollemache Halliday (1870–1966), Victoria Cross recipient
- George Edward Nurse (1873–1945), Victoria Cross recipient
- Herbert John Fleure (1877–1969), zoologist and geographer
- Ernest Martin Jehan (1878–1929), commander of a Q-Ship that sank German submarine UB-4 in 1915
- Arthur Maurice Hocart (1883–1939), anthropologist
- Percy Hodge (1890–1967), Olympic gold medalist, 3,000 metre steeplechase
- Ambrose Sherwill (1890–1968), President of the Controlling Committee during the German occupation of the Channel Islands, until he was deported
- Major-General Sir Thomas MacDonald "Donald" Banks KCB DSO MC TD (1891–1975), Director-General of the Petroleum Warfare Department 1940–45
- Barry Jones (1893–1981), actor
- Herbert Jolly (1895–1983), professional golfer
- James Parkes (1896–1981), clergyman, historian, and social activist
- Marjorie Ozanne (1897–1973), Guernsey author
- Michael Davidson (1897–1976), journalist
- Gerald Basil Edwards (1899–1976), author of The Book of Ebenezer Le Page
- Beatrice Collenette (1899–2001), dancer

== 20th century ==
- Ethel Wood (1901–2011), supercentenarian
- John Louis "Bonnie" Newton (1903–1962) DSC, Croix De Guerre (étoile en argent), born in Alderney, Special Operations Executive operative 1940–45.
- John Harold Henry Coombes (1906–1978), Principal of Cadet College Petaro, one of the earliest public schools built in Pakistan
- Marie Ozanne (1906–1943), protester against the German treatment of slave labourers during World War II
- Robert Morley (1908–1992), actor
- John Le Patourel (1909–1981), historian
- Philip Maitland Hubbard (1910–1980), crime fiction writer
- William "Billy" Spurdle (1911–2011), footballer, played for Manchester City F.C.
- Mary Eily de Putron (1914–1982), stained glass artist and archaeologist
- Wallace Le Patourel (1916–1979), Brigadier, Victoria Cross recipient
- John Marr (1918–2009), author
- George Clarence Bassett Smith (1919–2001), footballer; played for Southampton F.C.
- Hubert Nicolle (1919–1998), considered to be the first Commando of WW2, landed in occupied Guernsey in September 1940
- Peter Brock (1920–2006), historian
- Peter Le Cheminant (1920-2018), Air Chief Marshal and Lieutenant-Governor of Guernsey
- Frank Griffiths Caldwell (1921–2014), Major General OBE MC and bar
- Roy Dotrice (1923–2017), actor, winner of Tony and BAFTA Awards
- Sylvester Houédard (1924–1992), known as dsh, poet, literary editor and Benedictine monk
- Len Duquemin (1924–2003), footballer, played for Tottenham Hotspur F.C.
- William "Billy" Whare (1925–1995), footballer, played for Nottingham Forest F.C.
- Frederick Charles Hurrell (1928–2008), Air Vice-Marshal and Director-General of RAF Medical Services from 1986 to 1988
- Tony Fox (1928–2010), doctor and rower, represented Great Britain at the 1952 Summer Olympics and at the 1956 Summer Olympics
- Charles Wood (1932-2020), playwright and scriptwriter
- John Savident (1938-2024), actor, appeared in many TV series, including Coronation Street
- Peter Le Vasseur (born 1938), artist
- Nicholas Edward Day (born 1939), statistician and cancer epidemiologist
- Bruce Parker (born 1941), BBC television presenter, first presenter of Antiques Roadshow
- Dick Le Flem (born 1942), footballer, played for Nottingham Forest F.C. and England U23
- Noel Duquemin (born 1944), shooter, Commonwealth and Island Games
- Chris Foss (born 1946), British artist and science fiction illustrator
- George Torode (1946–2010), writer and radio host
- Malcolm Wicks (1947–2012), Member of Westminster Parliament
- Richard Doyle (1948-2017), British author of thriller novels
- Michele Dotrice (born 1948), actress, daughter of Roy Dotrice
- Simon Kay (born 1952?), plastic surgeon
- Adrian Fulford (born 1953), judge; formerly a member of the International Criminal Court in The Hague
- Karen Dotrice (born 1955), actress
- Linda Martel (1956-1961), healer
- Aden Gillett (born 1959), actor
- Andrew Lawrence-King (born 1959), baroque harpist, director of The Harp Consort
- Craig Allen (born 1959), football player in North American Soccer League and Major Indoor Soccer League
- Adrian Breton (1962–2007), 1990 Commonwealth Games gold medal, men's rapid fire pistol
- Martine Le Moignan (born 1962), squash player
- Lisa Opie (born 1963), squash player
- Ashley Highfield (born 1965), media magnate
- Sarah Montague (born 1966), BBC journalist and news presenter
- Carl Hester (born 1967), dressage rider, Team GB Olympian and 2012 Summer Olympics gold medal winner
- Jenny Kendall-Tobias (born 1967), radio presenter for BBC Radio Guernsey; known and loved locally as JKT
- Matthew Le Tissier (born 1968), retired Southampton FC and England footballer
- Martin Brady (born 1969), world record holder of the slowest heart ever recorded in a healthy human
- Lee Luscombe (born 1971), footballer; played for Brentford FC
- Alison Merrien (born 1971), indoor bowls player
- Andrew Singleton (born 1972), human geneticist
- Andy Priaulx (born 1973), four times touring car race champion
- Lee Savident (born 1976), cricketer; played for Hampshire County Cricket Club
- Thomas D’Arcy (born 1979) music producer
- Chris Tardif (born 1979), footballer; played for Portsmouth F.C.
- Dawn Porter (born 1979), BBC television presenter (born in Scotland but grew up in Guernsey)
- Lee Merrien (born 1979), athlete and Team GB Olympian
- Dale Garland (born 1980), athlete
- Paul Le Tocq (born 1981), badminton player
- Tom Druce (born 1986), athlete
- Chris Simpson (born 1987), squash player
- Tobyn Horton (born 1989), the Channel Islands' first professional cyclist
- Tim Ravenscroft (born 1992), cricketer; played for Hampshire County Cricket Club
- Heather Watson (born 1992), tennis player, 2009 US Open Girls' singles champion, Team GB Olympian and Wimbledon champion
- Harry Lewis (born 1996), better known as W2S, YouTube personality and member of the Sidemen
- Alex Crossan (born 1996), better known as Mura Masa, electronic music producer and DJ
- Cameron Chalmers (born 1997), British track and field sprinter

== 21st century ==
- Claudia Valentina (born 2001), singer/songwriter
- Maya Le Tissier (born 2002), footballer; plays for Manchester United and England
- Alex Scott (born 2003), footballer; plays for AFC Bournemouth

== Moved to and lived in Bailiwick of Guernsey ==
- General Sir John Doyle (1756–1834), Lieutenant Governor of Guernsey, drained Braye du Valle joining the north of Guernsey to the rest of the Island
- John Wilson, architect from Cumberland, lived in Guernsey 1813–1830, and designed some of the island's most iconic buildings, including Elizabeth College, St James, Castle Carey and the market buildings.
- Victor Hugo (1802–1885), author of The Hunchback of Notre Dame; lived in self-imposed exile on the island for 15 years, during which he wrote Les Misérables; Toilers of the Sea was dedicated to the island
- John Tapner (1823–1854), last person executed by Guernsey
- Pierre-Auguste Renoir (1841–1919), artist; spent summer of 1883 in Guernsey
- Henry Watson Fowler (1858–1933), lexicographer, moved to Guernsey in 1903
- Lilian Lyle (1867–1953), botanist and phycologist, studied the marine life of Guernsey during the 1920s
- Francis George Fowler (1871–1918), lexicographer, moved to Guernsey in 1903
- Compton Mackenzie (1883–1972), author, tenant of Herm
- Nicholas Monsarrat (1910–1979), author of The Cruel Sea and more than thirty other novels; lived in Guernsey from 1959 to 1963
- John Le Mesurier (1912–1983), actor in Dad's Army; lived in Guernsey for the majority of his life
- Cyril Fletcher (1913–2005), actor, comedian
- Robert Farnon (1917–2005), conductor and composer; lived in Guernsey for 40 years
- Derrick Bailey (1918–2009), founder of Aurigny Airlines
- Desmond Bagley (1923–1983), best-selling writer of thriller novels; lived in Guernsey 1976–1983
- Ronnie Ronalde (1923–2015), siffleur, lived in Guernsey from the 1960s to the 1980s
- Eliza Beresford (1926–2010), writer, creator of children's characters The Wombles; lived in Alderney
- G. N. Georgano (1932–2017), author of reference books about motorcars
- Brian Walden (1932–2019), broadcaster and Labour politician
- David and Frederick Barclay (both born 1934), businessmen in media, retail and property
- Oliver Reed (1938–1999), actor in Gladiator, Oliver! and other films; lived in Guernsey for many years
- Dawn Brooke (born 1938), world's oldest natural mother; gave birth in 1997 at the age of 59
- Mary Perkins (born 1944), co-founder and a senior executive of Specsavers
- Raymond Evison, (born 1944), nurseryman, lecturer, author and photographer
- Norman Wood (1947-2023), Scottish Ryder Cup player
- Guy Hands (born 1959), financier and investor, former chairman of EMI
- Wayne Bulpitt (born 1961), UK Chief Commissioner for The Scout Association
- Liam Mooney (born 1972), Businessman ex professional rugby player
- Zef Eisenberg (1973–2020), Maximuscle founder and motorbike land speed records holder

== See also ==
- Category:Guernsey people by parish
- List of governors of Guernsey
- Lieutenant Governor of Guernsey
- List of bailiffs of Guernsey
- Lieutenant Governor of Jersey
- List of bailiffs of Jersey
- List of people from Jersey
- List of politicians in Jersey
