= Bibliography of Guernsey =

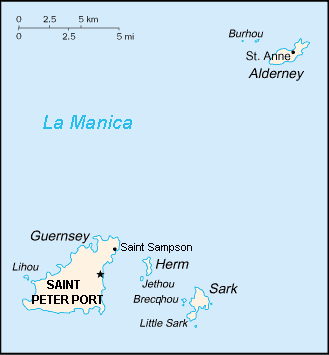

This is a list of books in the English language which deal with Guernsey and its geography, history, inhabitants, culture, biota, etc.

- Allisette R. - Islanders Kitbags
- Alvarez J.E. - German Occupation of the Channel Islands
- Anderson, O. D. – Analysing Time Series: Proceedings of the International Conference Held in Guernsey, Channel Islands, in October 1979.
- Ansted, David Thomas and Robert Gordon Latham – The Channel Islands.
- A Bibliographical Guide to the Law of the United Kingdom, the Channel Islands, and the Isle of Man.
- Antill J.K. - A bibliography of the German Occupation of the CHannel Islands
- Bachmann K.M. - The Prey of an Eagle
- Backhurst M-L. - Tracing your Channel Island Ancestors
- Barbet S. - Barbets guide to the Island of Guernsey
- Bell W. - Guernsey Occupied but never Conquered, ISBN 978-0952047933
- Bell W.M. - I beg to report, ISBN 978-0952047919
- Bell W.M. The Commando who came to stay
- Bell W.M. - Guernsey Green, ISBN 9780952047902
- Berry W. - The history of the Island of Guernsey
- Best M. - A family business
- Bichard J & McClintock — Wild flowers of the Channel Islands
- Bicknell E.E. - The little guides — the Channel Islands
- Bihet M — A Child's War
- Bihet M. - Reflections of Guernsey
- Bihet M. - A time for memories: The Dame of Sark and Islanders lives remembered
- Billing J — The hidden places of the Channel Islands
- Binding T. - Island madness
- Binding T. - Lying with the enemy, ISBN 978-0786706570
- Black C.B. - Blacks guide to the Channel Islands
- Blampied G. - Mayday Mayday a history of the Guernsey lifeboat station, ISBN 978-0902550100
- Blicq R. - Au revoir, Sarnia Cherie, ISBN 978-0968698907
- Bonnard B. - Alderney at War, ISBN 978-0750903431
- Bonnard B. - Wrecked around Alderney, the Stories of Retired Alderney Pilot, Jack Quinain, ISBN 978-0952070702
- Bonnard B & J — A natural history of Guernsey, Alderney, Sark and Herm
- Bonser N.R.P — The Guernsey Railway, ISBN 978-0853613299
- Bonser N.R.P. The Guernsey Railway the German occupation lines
- Brett C.E.B. - National Trust of Guernsey. Buildings in the Town and Parish of St Peter Port
- Briggs A. - The Channel Islands Occupation and Liberation, ISBN 978-0713478228
- Brock C. - Clear shining after the rain — a Guernsey story
- Broomhead R. - Jersey and Guernsey
- Bunting M — The model occupation
- Campbell, Alfred S. – Golden Guernsey.
- Carey E. — The Channel Islands
- Carey William W., Edith F. Carey & Spencer C. Carey — The history of the Carey's of Guernsey (1938)
- Carmen W.J. - Channel Island Transport a history of public transportin Alderney, Guernsey and Jersey by road and rail from 1788 to 1987
- Chaney, Edward — Genius Friend: G.B. Edwards and The Book of Ebenezer Le Page (Blue Ormer, 2015) ISBN 978-0992879105
- Channel Islands Occupation Society — Occupation Review — annual publication
- Clarke L. — Tourist's guide to the Channel Islands
- Clarke L. — Sark Discovered
- Closs A. — Tastes of the Channel Islands
- Cochrane J. — Life on Sark: Through the year
- Cohen F. - The Jews in the Channel Islands During the German Occupation 1940-1945
- Collenette V. - Elizabeth College in Exile 1940-45
- Compton R. - The Complete Book of Traditional Guernsey and Jersey Knitting
- Cook C. - The Guilberts of Hauteville
- Coombe, Simon - John Wilson, Guernsey's Architect: A Celebration (Blue Ormer, 2018) ISBN 978-0992879181
- Cooper B. - The Battle of the Torpedo Boats, ISBN 978-0330232432
- Cortviend V.V. - Isolated Island — A historical and personal reminiscence of the German occupation of the Island of Guernsey June 1940 - May 1945
- Cox, Gregory Stevens - St Peter Port 1680-1830: The History of an International Entrepot (Boydell & Brewer, 1999) ISBN 978-0851157580
- Cox, Gregory Stevens - Guernsey Merchants and their World (Toucan Press, 2009) ISBN 978-0856946035
- Cox, Gregory Stevens - Victor Hugo's St Peter Port (Blue Ormer, 2018) ISBN 978-0992879174
- Coysh V. - Swastika over Guernsey
- Coysh V. - Guernsey
- Coysh V. - Alderney
- Coysh V. - The Channel Islands — a new study
- Coysh V. - Call of the Island — Guernsey Remembered
- Coysh V. - Channel Islets
- Coysh V. - The Bailiwick of Guernsey, the Jubilee Years, 1952-1977
- Coysh V. - Royal Guernsey — a history of the Royal Guernsey Militia
- Coysh V. - Old Guernsey in Pictures including Alderney, Sark, Herm and Jethou
- Coysh V. - Sark — the last stronghold of feudalism
- Coysh V. - Visitor's Guide, Guernsey, Alderney & Sark
- Coysh V. & Toms C. - Bygone Guernsey, ISBN 978-0850336429
- Coysh V. & Toms C. - Guernsey Through the Lens: Including Alderney, Sark, Herm and Jethou (1979) ISBN 9780850333114
- Coysh V. & Toms C. - Guernsey — through the lens again
- Cruickshank, Charles – The German Occupation of the Channel Islands.
- Curtis S.de – An account of the discovery of a cist or Dolmen of a type novel to Guernsey
- Dafter Rayde – GUERNSEY SENTINEL, The Remarkable Les Hanois Lighthouse (2003)
- de Garis, Marie – Folklore of Guernsey.
- de Guerin Basil C. – The Norman Isles (1952)
- de Sausmarez, Havilland, The Extentes of Guernsey, 1248 to 1331, and Other Documents Relating to Ancient Usages and Customs in That Island.
- de Sausmarez, Havilland, Guernsey & The Imperial Contribution (Royal Court 1930)
- Dobson, Roderick – The Birds of the Channel Islands.
- Durand, Ralph;– Guernsey under German Rule. (Guernsey Society, 1946), 2nd ed. (Guernsey Society, 2018)
- Dury, G. – The Channel Islands.
- Eagleston, A. J. – The Channel Islands under Tudor Government, 1485-1642: A Study in Administrative History. (Cambridge University Press for the Guernsey Society, 1949)
- Falla, Frank - The Silent War, 4th ed. (Blue Ormer, 2018) ISBN 978-1999891312
- Fleure, H. J. – British Landscape Through Maps. 3: Guernsey.
- Foster, Stephen - Zoffany's Daughter: Love and treachery on a small island (Blue Ormer, 2017) ISBN 978-0992879143
- Forty, George - Channel Islands at War
- Forty, George - German Occupation of the Channel Islands
- Fraser, David – The Jews of the Channel Islands and the Rule of Law, 1940-1945: 'Quite contrary to the Principles of British Justice'.
- Frossard, Cannon E.L. - The German Occupation of Guernsey
- Gallienne, Osmond - My Life in Guernsey
- Gavey, Ernie - German fortifications in Guernsey
- Ginns, Michael - German tunnels in the Channel Islands
- Girard, Peter - Peter Girard's Guernsey
- Girard, Peter - More of Peter Girard's Guernsey
- Goudge, Elizabeth - Island Magic
- Goudge, Elizabeth - Green Dolphin Country
- Guernsey Museums & Galleries - Maritime Guernsey (1992) ISBN 9781871560459
- Guernsey Museums & Galleries - The Greatest Treasure Philip Saumarez and the Voyage of the Centurion (1994) ISBN 1871560861
- Guernsey Society, members of "The Guernsey Farmhouse" (De La Rue for the Guernsey Society, 1963)
- Guillemette, Louis - The People's Messenger: the Occupation Diaries of Louis Guillemette, Guernsey 1940-45 (Blue Ormer, 2022) ISBN 9781999341565
- Gurney, David - "Postal History of the Guernsey Sub-Post Offices"
- Harris, J. Theodore and Sidney Webb – An Example of Communal Currency: the Facts about the Guernsey Market House.
- Hocart, Richard – An Island Assembly: The Development of the States of Guernsey, 1700-1949.
- Horwood, A. R. – A Hand-list of the Lichens of Great Britain, Ireland and the Channel Islands.
- Hugo, George W.J.L. - Guernsey As It Used To Be: A Tour of the Town in Victorian Times (Blue Ormer, 2017) ISBN 978-0-992879129
- Jamieson, A. G. – A People of the Sea: The Maritime History of the Channel Islands.
- Jee, Nigel – The Landscape of the Channel Islands.
- Johnston, Peter, A Short History of Guernsey, 6th ed. (Guernsey Society, 2014).
- Jorgensen-Earp, Cheryl R. – Discourse and Defiance Under Nazi Occupation: Guernsey, Channel Islands, 1940-1945 (2013) ISBN 9781611860825
- Keeton, G. W., Dennis Lloyd, and George W. Keeton – The British Commonwealth: The Development of Its Laws and Constitutions, Volume 1: The United Kingdom, Part 2: Scotland and the Channgel Islands.
- Kendrick, T. D. – The Archaeology of the Channel Islands. In 2 Vols. Vol. 1. The Bailiwick of Guernsey.
- King, Peter – The Channel Islands War, 1940-1945.
- Le Huray C.P. – The Bailiwick of Guernsey (1974) ISBN 9780340009598
- Le Patourel, J. H. – The Medieval Administration of the Channel Islands, 1199-1399.
- Lempriere Raoul – Portrait of the Channel Islands (1970)
- Lempriere Raoul – Customs, Ceremonies & Traditions of the Channel Islands (1976)
- Liddicoat, Anthony – A Grammar of the Norman French of the Channel Islands: The Dialects of Jersey and Sark.
- Lockley, R. M. – The Charm of the Channel Islands.
- Lyle, Lillian – The Marine Algae of Guernsey.
- MacCulloch, Edgar and Edith F. Carey – Guernsey Folk Lore.
- Mahy, Miriam M. – There Is an Occupation (1992) ISBN 9780951976708
- Marr L. James – History of the Bailiwick of Guernsey (1982) ISBN 9780850334593
- Marr L. James – More People in Guernsey's Story (1991)
- Martin, Patrick – Wrecked: Guernsey Shipwreck (2015) ISBN 1871560152
- Maxwell, W. Harold and Leslie F. Maxwell – A Legal Bibliography of the British Commonwealth of Nations, Volume 1: English Law to 1800, including Wales, the Channel Islands and the Isle of Man.
- McClintock, D. – The Life of Joshua Gosselin of Guernsey.
- McClintock, David – Guernsey's Earliest Flora: Flora Samiensis by Joshua Gosselin.
- McClintock, David – The Wild Flowers of Guernsey.
- McLaughlin, Roy;- The Sea was their Fortune 1997 ISBN 0948578866
- Morris, Joseph E. – Beautiful Britain: The Channel Islands.
- Ogier, Darryl M. – Reformation and Society in Guernsey. (1997) ISBN 9780851156033
- Perrin, William F., Bernd Würsig & J. G. M. Thewissen – Encyclopedia of Marine Mammals.
- Peterson, C. D., D. A. Pearlman, T. D. Dines, H. R. Arnold, and Jane M. Croft – New Atlas of the British & Irish Flora: An Atlas of the Vascular Plants of Britain, Ireland, the Isle of Man and the Channel Islands.
- Ramisch, Heinrich – Variation of English in Guernsey/Channel Islands.
- Ramsey, Winston G. – The War in the Channel Islands: Then and Now.
- Richard, John D. and David McClintock – Wild Flowers of the Channel Islands.
- Roussel Leslie E. – Evacuation (1980) ISBN 9780861164417
- Rule, Margaret & Jason Monaghan – (1993) ISBN 1871560039
- Sauvary J.C. – Diary of the German occupation of Guernsey 1940-1945 (1990) ISBN 9781854210913
- Sharp Frederick – The Church Bells of Guernsey Alderney & Sark. (1964)
- Sheridan, L. A. – The United Kingdom: The Development of Its Laws and Constitution: The Channel Islands.
- Sinel, Joseph – Prehistoric Times and Men of the Channel Islands.
- Thornton, Tim – The Channel Islands, 1370-1640: Between England and Normandy (2012) ISBN 9781843837114
- Toms, Carol – Guernsey: Pictures from the Past (1991) ISBN 9780850337839
- Toms, Carol – Guernsey's Forgotten Past (1992) ISBN 9780850338508
- Uttley, John – The Story of the Channel Islands.
- Vaudin, Mike – 100 YEARS of the Fruit. A celebration of 100 years of the Blue Diamond Group
- Warren, J. P. – Our Own Island: A Descriptive Account of Guernsey.
