= Cyananthus longiflorus =

Scientific classification
- Kingdom: Plantae
- Clade: Tracheophytes
- Clade: Angiosperms
- Clade: Eudicots
- Clade: Asterids
- Order: Asterales
- Family: Campanulaceae
- Genus: Cyananthus
- Species: C. longiflorus

Binomial name
- Cyananthus longiflorus Franch.

Synonyms
- Cyananthus argenteus C.Marquand; Cyananthus obtusilobus C.Marquand

Species of flowering plant

Cyananthus longiflorus is a species of flowering plant in the family Campanulaceae.

== Description ==
The main stem (caudex) of the plant is robust and has some roughly 2 millimeter large scales towards its top. The stems are clustered in upright tufts 4–22 centimeters (1.6–8.7 in) tall. The leaves are arranged alternate to each other along the stem, and their lower side is covered in dense silver hairs. Each stem is topped with a single flower which is on a very short stalk and is surrounded by 3 leaves. The petals are blue-purple in color and are 3.5–5 cm (1.4–2.0 in) long. The style is long, and almost extends up to the corolla. It flowers from July to September.

== Taxonomy ==
Cyananthus longiflorus was first described by Adrien René Franchet in 1887. Two invalid synonyms, C. argenteus and C. obstusilobus, were introduced by Cecil Victor Boley Marquand in 1924.

== Ecology ==
The species is found among pine trees in forested areas, as well as on dry slopes and sandy dunes. It is found at elevations of 2,800–4,300 meters (9,200–14,100 ft), and is restricted in its distribution to western Yunnan in China. The species is not grown in cultivation.
