= Candie Cemetery =

Public cemetery in St Peter Port, Guernsey, Channel Islands

Coordinates: 49°27′30″N 2°32′30″W

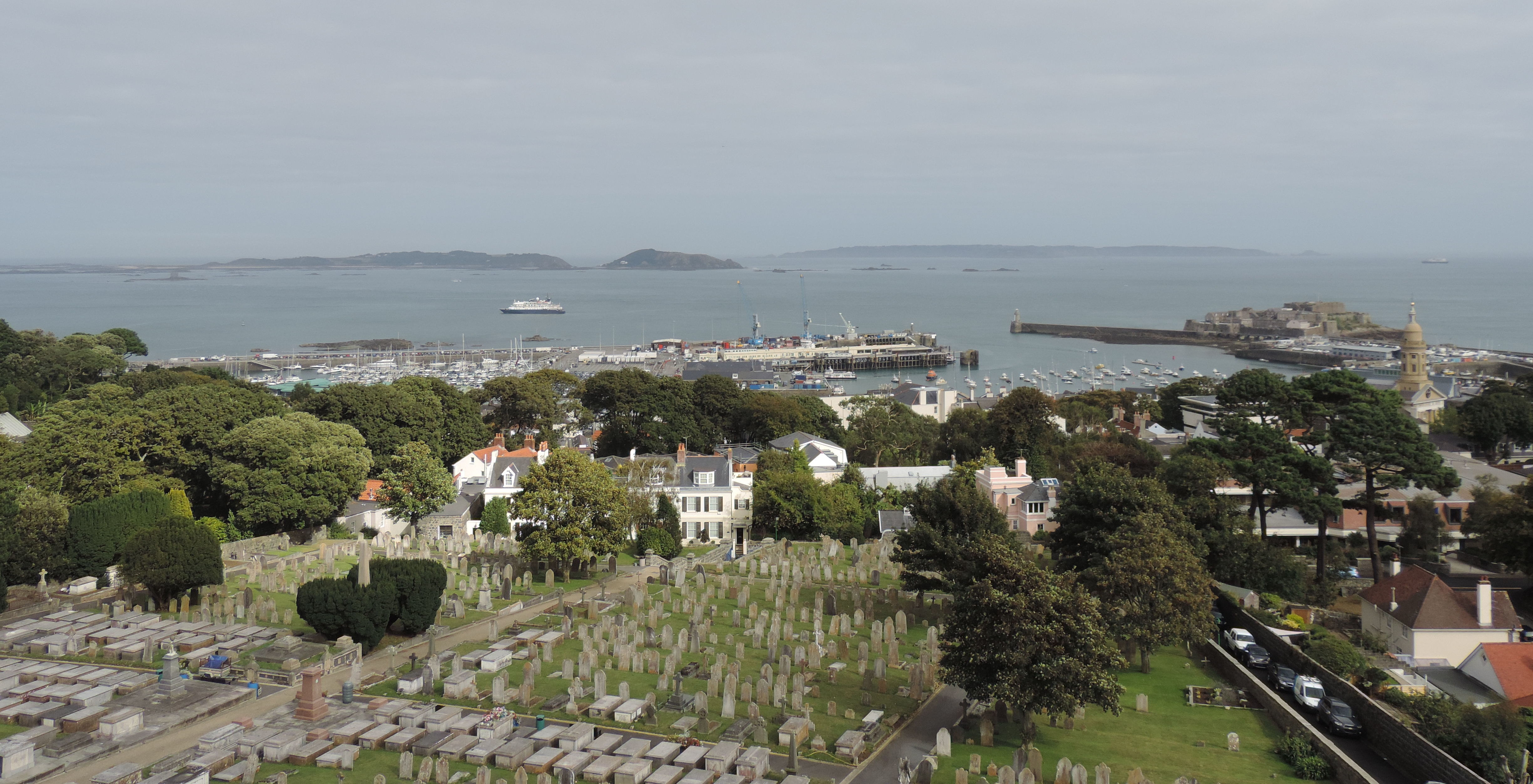
Candie Cemetery from Victoria Tower

Candie Cemetery is a public cemetery in St Peter Port, Guernsey.

== History ==
Burials in St Peter Port were originally in and around the Town Church, but there was little room there and other cemeteries were then used: the Cimitière des Soeurs, or Sisters' Cemetery which was located on rising ground to the south of the Church, and the Cimetière des Frères or Brothers' Cemetery which was located north of town. In 1780 a Cimitière des Étrangers, or Strangers' Cemetery, was created, near Elizabeth College, but by 1830 it too was full and Candie Cemetery was opened. In the 1890s Candie Cemetery was still referred to as the “New Cemetery”.

There are five war graves in Candie Cemetery; all five soldiers died after the end of WWI.

In 2021 a remembrance garden was created in Candie Cemetery.

Priaulx Library holds copies of the burial records from Candie Cemetery for the period 1831 to 1986.

== Notable burials ==
- Harman Blennerhassett (1764–1831), plantation owner in Virginia (present-day West Virginia).
- Johnny Bromby (1840–1851), son of John Bromby, headmaster of Elizabeth College (and subsequently the founding headmaster of Melbourne Grammar School), who hanged himself while larking about in the boarders’ room.
- Peter Le Lievre (1812–1878), artist.
- Samuel Elliott Hoskins (1799–1888), physician.
- Ralph Durand (1876–1945), writer.
- Robert William Randall, one of the members of the Randalls Brewery family.
