= Priaulx =

Priaulx is a name of French origin, and may refer to:

- Andy Priaulx (born 1974), British professional racing driver from Guernsey
- Priaulx Rainier (1903–86), South African-British composer
- Priaulx League, an association football league on the island of Guernsey
- Priaulx Library, located in St Peter Port, Guernsey
- Sebastian Priaulx (born 2001), British racing driver from Guernsey
