= Salix annulifera =

Scientific classification
- Kingdom: Plantae
- Clade: Tracheophytes
- Clade: Angiosperms
- Clade: Eudicots
- Clade: Rosids
- Order: Malpighiales
- Family: Salicaceae
- Genus: Salix
- Species: S. annulifera

Binomial name
- Salix annulifera C.Marquand & Airy Shaw

Shrub in the genus of willows

Salix annulifera is a small shrub from the genus of the willow (Salix) with up to 8 centimeter long leaf blades. The natural range of the species is in China.

== Description ==
Salix annulifera is a shrub up to 50 centimeters high with thick, upright or ascending branches. The twigs are initially hairy and fluffy and later bald. Young twigs are brown and blackish when dried. The leaves have a 1.5 centimeter long, downy hairy stem. The leaf blade is 2 to 5, rarely 8 centimeters long, 1.5 to 2.5, rarely 3.5 centimeters wide, obovate-elliptical, with a blunt-rounded tip, a wedge-shaped or seldom blunt-rounded leaf base and a tightly notched leaf margin. The upper side of the leaf is dull green and glabrous, the underside light green, initially gray-white fluffy hairy and later bald.

As inflorescences growing are at the ends of branches kitten formed. Male kittens are 2 to 4 centimeters long and have a hairy inflorescence axis. The bracts are about half as long as the stamens, obovate-oblong, densely hairy with a more or less truncated tip and slightly irregular or densely serrated leaf margin. Male flowers have an adaxial and an abaxial nectar gland. The two stamens are 5 to 6 millimeters long, the stamens are hairy down three-quarters to the entire length. Female inflorescences are about 3.5 centimeters long and reach a length of 11 centimeters when the fruit is ripe. The bracts are obovate-oblong, sparsely hairy on the underside, with a marginal tip. Female flowers have an adaxially located nectar gland. The ovary is hairy gray-white. The style is conspicuous, with entire margins or bilobed, the stigma has two columns or two stigmas are formed. Salix annulifera flowers from July to August, the fruits ripen in August.

== Range ==
The natural range is in bushes on mountain slopes at 3400 to 4100 meters altitude in the northwest of the Chinese province of Yunnan and in the east of Tibet.

== Taxonomy ==
Salix annulifera is a species in the willow family Salicaceae, where it is assigned to the Floccosae section. It was scientifically described for the first time in 1929 by Cecil Victor Boley Marquand and Herbert Kenneth Airy Shaw. The genus name Salix is Latin and was used by the Romans for willow species.

There are four varieties:

- Salix annulifera var. Annulifera bracts with slightly and irregularly serrated leaf margin.
- Salix annulifera var. Dentata S. D. Zhao Bracts with a densely serrated leaf margin.
- Salix annulifera var. Glabra P. Y. Mao & WZ Li Bracts glabrous with entire tip and glabrous stamens.
- Salix annulifera var. Macroula C. Marquand & Airy Shaw Foliage leaves with a long stalk and large, 8 cm long and 3.5 cm wide leaf blades and up to 11 cm long catkins.

== Literature ==
- Wu Zheng-yi, Peter H. Raven (Ed.): Flora of China. Volume 4: Cycadaceae through Fagaceae. Science Press / Missouri Botanical Garden Press, Beijing / St. Louis 1999, ISBN 0-915279-70-3, pp. 210–211 (English).
- Helmut Genaust: Etymological dictionary of botanical plant names. 3rd, completely revised and expanded edition. Nikol, Hamburg 2005, ISBN 3-937872-16-7 (reprint from 1996).
