= Cyananthus macrocalyx =

Scientific classification
- Kingdom: Plantae
- Clade: Tracheophytes
- Clade: Angiosperms
- Clade: Eudicots
- Clade: Asterids
- Order: Asterales
- Family: Campanulaceae
- Genus: Cyananthus
- Species: C. macrocalyx

Binomial name
- Cyananthus macrocalyx Franch.

Species of flowering plant

Cyananthus macrocalyx is a flowering plant in the family Campanulaceae. The species is native to central and western China, Nepal, Myanmar, and the Assam region of India. It is found in Alpine meadows and grassy slopes at elevations of 2,500–5,300 meters.

== Description ==
The main root of the plant (caudex) is large and woody, with high concentrations of lignin. Towards its top, it is covered in lance-shaped scales that are 2–6 millimeters long. The stems grow upright from the underground caudex in dense clumps. The leaves grow from the stem in an ascending spiral, becoming larger in area the closer they are to the end of the stem. The leaf blades are nearly circular, or are rounded at the end and tapering to the base. They measure 5–10 by 1–6 mm and are covered in dense white hairs on their underside. Each leaf is attached to the stem by a petiole 1–4 mm long.

The flowers grow individually on the ends of each stem. The protective sepals are yellow-green or purplish in color, and are sometimes covered in dense brown hairs. The flower petals are yellow, but can sometimes have purple or red veins. Towards their ends they are hairless, but there are many threadlike hairs towards the center of the flower where the petals meet. The ovary extends up to this point, while the seed capsules extend above it. The seeds are oval-shaped, smooth, and roughly 1.3 mm long. The species flowers from July to August.

== Taxonomy ==
Cyananthus macrocalyx was described in 1887 by Adrien René Franchet. The species Cyananthus spathulifolius was described by John Axel Nannfeldt in 1930. However, its close similarities to C. macrocalyx were noted, and in 1997 it was demoted to a subspecies under the new name C. macrocalyx subsp. spathulifolius (Nannf.) K.K.Shrestha. It differs in the shape of the leaf blade, its longer flower stalks, and its smaller calyx tube.

== Reproduction ==
Cyananthus macrocalyx is gynodioecious: plants have either only female organs or both male and female organs (known as a hermaphrodite). The mass of the hermaphroditic flowers is much higher than that of the female flowers. However, the female plants have larger female organs than the hermaphrodites; in other words, the pistil is larger in the female plants.
