= Le Patourel =

Le Patourel (with the variant Pasturel) is a surname found mainly on the island of Guernsey. It comes from the Anglo-Norman French appellation le pastorel ('the shepherd, simpleton'), which is in origin a diminutive of pastour ('shepherd'). At the 1881 census of the United Kingdom, 96 people in Great Britain bore the name; as of about 2016, 15 people bore the name in Great Britain and none in Ireland.

== People ==
Notable people with the name include:

- Wallace Le Patourel (1916–1979), British soldier
- Jean Le Patourel (1915–2011), British archaeologist
- John Le Patourel (1909–1981), British historian
- Owen Le Patourel Franklin (1905–1979), English composer
