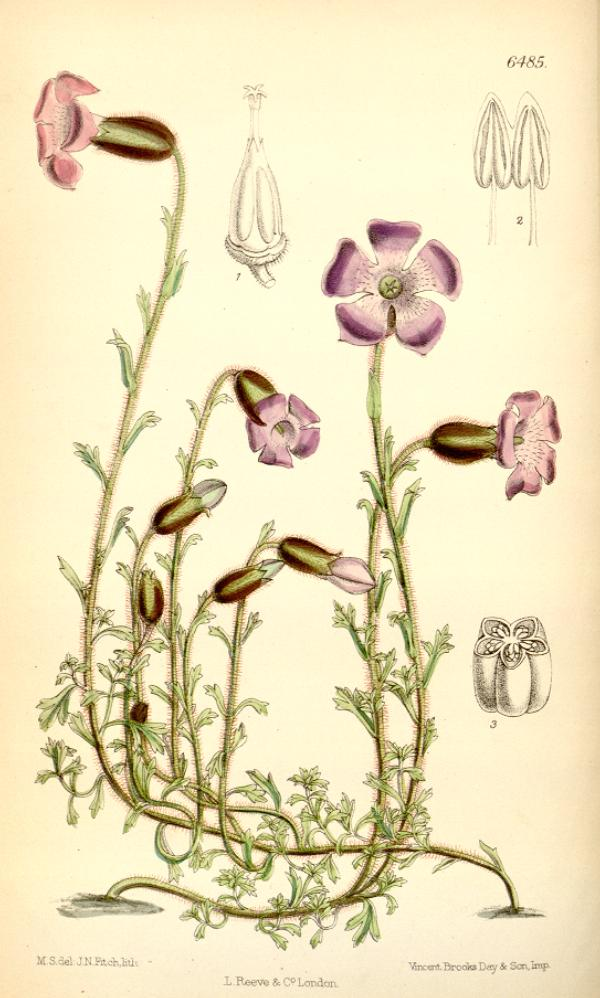

Scientific classification
- Kingdom: Plantae
- Clade: Tracheophytes
- Clade: Angiosperms
- Clade: Eudicots
- Clade: Asterids
- Order: Asterales
- Family: Campanulaceae
- Genus: Cyananthus
- Species: C. lobatus

Binomial name
- Cyananthus lobatus Wall. ex Benth.

Synonyms
- Cyananthus farreri (C.Marquand) C.Marquand; Cyananthus insignis R.E.Grahame; Cyananthus lobatus f. albiflorus J.Luo & Shu L.Wang

= Cyananthus lobatus =

Species of flowering plant

Cyananthus lobatus, commonly known as the lobed-leaved cyananth or trailing bellflower, is an ornamental flowering plant of the family Campanulaceae.

== Description ==
Cyananthus lobatus is a perennial plant which grows into a low mat up to 10 cm (3.9 in) tall and 10–50 cm (3.9–19.7 in) wide. It usually takes two to five years to reach its maximum size.

=== Roots ===
Its roots are shaped like carrots, and can be up to 1.3 cm (0.51 in) wide. They have a sturdy caudex (rootstock) which is branched and has scales towards its end. These scales are ovate (egg-shaped) or lanceolate (lance-shaped) and are roughly 4 mm in size.

=== Stems and leaves ===
Its many stems grow prostrate, or along the ground, and are each 10–25 cm (3.9–9.8 in) long. They are clustered in a dense turf, and on the ends they are villous, sparsely covered with both long and short soft hairs.

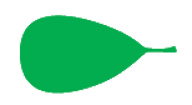
C. lobatus has obovate leaves and petals

The leaves are 1–2.5 cm (0.39–0.98 in) long, are dull green in color, and have either a deeply lobed or toothed shape. They are placed alternate, across the stem from one another, and are sessile (directly connected to the stem) or have very short leaf stalks which are less than 5 mm long. At the base, there is a wedge shape which tapers into this connection point.

The leaf blades are obovate, a reverse ovate shape which is narrower towards the base and broadening towards the tip. They can also be several other shapes, including that of a reverse lanceolate shape, a broad tip and narrow base, or a rhombus-like shape. The texture of the leaf is slightly leathery; the bottom side is covered in shaggy hairs and the upper side has sparse stiff hairs or lacks hairs altogether. The edges of the blade are slightly rolled under towards the midrib of the leaf.

=== Inflorescence ===
The species' flowers are the most showy part of the plant. They can be up to 3–4 cm (1.2–1.6 in) in diameter. The sepal tube is prominent and covered in black hairs. It is 1.5–2 cm (0.59–0.79 in) long, and a third of it is lobed. The pedicels which connect the flowers to the stem are 1–3 cm (0.39–1.18 in) long and have course, rough hairs. The calyx tube is cylindrical and has dense brown-red bristle-like hairs.

Each flower has five petals, which can vary widely in color. They are usually a bright blue-purple, but can also be a paler shade or rarely completely white. The petals are also an obovate shape, similar to that of the species' leaves. Each petal is hairy in the throat, or center, of the flower.

== Taxonomy ==
Cyananthus lobatus was described by Nathaniel Wallich in first volume of the journal Illustrations of the Botany of the Himalayan Mountains in 1836. It has a chromosome number of 2n=28.

=== Etymology ===
In English, the species is commonly referred to as the lobed-leaved cyananth or as trailing bellflower. In Mandarin it is called 裂叶蓝钟花 (Liè yè lán zhōng huā).

=== Infraspecifics ===
C. lobatus var. insignis is a variety of the species, which has larger flowers that can be up to 5 cm (2.0 in) wide. While the variety was described as its own species under the name Cyananthus insignis by R.E. Grahame in 1940, according to the Vienna Code this description was invalid due to the lack of a Latin description and diagnosis, and thus is not accepted.

== Distribution and habitat ==
Cyananthus lobatus is native to the Himalayas, and its range stretches from the Himachal Pradesh in India to Tibet and Yunnan in China. It can be found at altitudes of 3,300–4,500 m (10,800–14,800 ft) and its habitat is grassy slopes and forests.

== Ecology ==
While Cyananthus lobatus is typically disease free, it can be affected by pests like aphids and glasshouse red spider mites when it is grown in a greenhouse.

== Cultivation ==

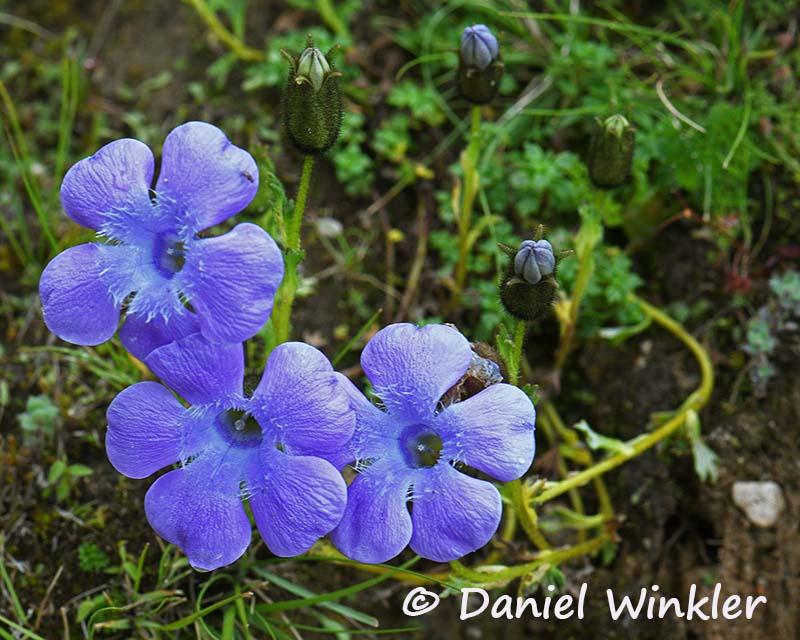

Cyananthus lobatus was awarded the Royal Horticultural Society Award of Garden Merit, a designation which signifies that the species is a reliable plant and is suitable for cultivation.

The species is capable of being grown in poor soil, but performs better in rich humus. It requires moist soil with proper drainage, and prefers the ground to be neutral to slightly acidic in pH. It should be kept cool and at least partially shaded. It is typically grown in gravel or rock gardens or indoors in pots, and does not require any pruning.

C. lobatus can be propagated by either seed or cuttings. When propagating by seed, it should be sown as soon as it is ripe; when propagating by cuttings, rooting softwood should be used in late spring or early summer. The species flowers in the late summer, but will display foliage from spring to fall.

=== Cultivars ===
The 'Sheriff's Variety' cultivar of Cyananthus lobatus has larger flowers which are more pale and lavender in color. The 'Giant Form' cultivar is larger in size, with a diameter of up to 60 cm (24 in), roughly 10 cm (3.9 in) larger than standard plants of the species. It is sold for use as a cascading plant in rock gardens.
