= Guernsey Society =

Organisation for the Bailiwick of Guernsey

The Guernsey Society is an organisation for people with an interest in the Bailiwick of Guernsey.

== Society aims ==
The Guernsey Society aims are to promote, maintain and stimulate interest in all matters concerning the Bailiwick of Guernsey, its past, present and future - and keeping alive the Spirit of Guernsey both in the islands and overseas.

- Publish The Review of the Guernsey Society twice a year - a high quality magazine with articles on Guernsey's past, present and future
- Organise meetings - both formal and informal - in Guernsey, the United Kingdom, and elsewhere
- Provide a network for anyone with an interest in Guernsey

== History of the Society ==
The Guernsey Society was formed in 1943 to represent the interests of the island to the British Government during the German Occupation, and to establish a network for Guernsey evacuees in the United Kingdom.

The Society was the idea of three Guernseymen based in London: Sir Donald Banks, Air Commodore Henry Le Marchant Brock and Colonel Guy Durand Ozanne. Banks became the first Chairman, and Brock became the first Secretary. Other notable founder members included: actor Barry Jones, Professor John Le Patourel, Sir William Arnold and Professor Herbert Fleure.

== Publications ==
The Society has published a regular magazine since 1945. The Bulletin appeared eight times during 1945 and 1946. It became Quarterly Review of the Guernsey Society in January 1947, and continued until 1971, when the frequency was reduced to three times a year, and the title changed to The Review of the Guernsey Society. Since its inception it has published articles from a wide range of respected Guernsey figures including Ambrose Sherwill, John Le Patourel, James Marr, Marie de Garis and TF Priaulx.

In the summer of 1944, the newly formed Society was instrumental in organising, together with prominent members of the Jersey Society in London, a symposium in Oxford to start planning for the future of the Channel Islands following their liberation from Nazi Occupation. The result was the publication of a book, Nos Iles, which was widely read by members of the States of Guernsey and States of Jersey, and became known as "the Liberation Army's bible".

The Society has also published a number of books on the island and its history:

- Durand, R, Guernsey under German Rule, 1946 - one of the first accounts to be published about life during the German Occupation
- Eagleston, AJ, Channel Islands Under Tudor Government, 1951
- Members of the Guernsey Society, The Guernsey Farmhouse, 1963 - a survey of the architecture of Guernsey farmhouses
- Guernsey Ways, 1966 - a selection of articles from the Review, published to celebrate the 900th anniversary of the Battle of Hastings
- Marr, LJ, More Guernsey People, 1992 - the sequel to Marr's Guernsey People biographical dictionary (published 1984)
- Johnston, Peter A Short History of Guernsey, 2014.
- Durand, R, Guernsey under German Rule, 2018 - the society published a new edition of this work, which had long been out of print, to mark the 75th Anniversary of the society. The new edition includes a Foreword by the Bailiff of Guernsey, Sir Richard Collas, and an introduction by Vice Chairman, Stephen Foote.

== Notability ==
Articles from The Review, as well as other Society publications, have been influential and widely used as source material for authoritative works on the island's history. Examples include:

- The Guernsey Farmhouse provided the inspiration for John McCormack's The Guernsey House.
- Marie de Garis' Folklore of Guernsey started off as a series of articles published in The Review during the 1970s.
- The following published doctoral theses cite a number of articles from The Review amongst their references:
  - Stevens-Cox, Gregory, St Peter Port 1680-1830: the history of an international entrepot, Boydell Press (1999)
  - Crossan, Rose-Marie, Guernsey 1814-1914: Migration and Modernisation, Boydell Press (2007)
- Edward Chaney's series of articles (1994–95) about G B Edwards, the reclusive author of The Book of Ebenezer Le Page formed the basis for the authoritative biography Genius Friend: G.B. Edwards and The Book of Ebenezer Le Page, published by Blue Ormer Publishing in 2015.
- The official history of the Occupation of the Channel Islands, commissioned by the governments of Guernsey and Jersey in 1970, lists among its references Nos Iles and Durand's Guernsey Under German Rule (see above).
- Eagleston's book The Tudor Administration of the Channel Islands is widely cited, and seen as the reference work for this period in the islands' history.

== Activities ==
The Society organises regular formal and informal meetings in London and Guernsey.

In 2010, the Society launched Donkipedia, a wiki dedicated to the Bailiwick of Guernsey.

== See also ==
- Archaeology of the Channel Islands
- Jersey Heritage
- Société Jersiaise
