= Jean Le Patourel =

British archaeologist (1915-2011)

- Born: Hilda Elizabeth Jean Bird; 19 August 1915; Weymouth, England
- Died: 20 January 2011 (aged 95)
- Occupations: Archaeologist; Academic
- Known for: The study of medieval ceramics and moated sites
- Spouse: John Le Patourel (m. 1939)

Academic background
- Education: Croydon High School
- Alma mater: Bedford College, London

Academic work
- Discipline: Medieval History
- Institutions: University of Leeds

Hilda Elizabeth Jean Le Patourel FSA (19 August 1915 – 20 January 2011) was a British archaeologist. She specialised in the ceramics and pottery of Yorkshire. She later expanded her field of research to include moated sites and the archaeological remains of dog collars.

== Biography ==
Hilda Elizabeth Jean Bird was born in Weymouth, on 19 August 1915. She was educated at Croydon High School and Bedford College, University of London, where she studied history. She graduated in 1938 and studied for a further year for a Diploma in Education. In 1939 she married John Le Patourel, who was a lecturer at University College London. In 1945 they moved to Leeds, as her husband was appointed Professor of Medieval History at the University of Leeds.

== Career ==
Soon after Le Patourel arrived in Leeds, she and her husband began work on the excavations at Kirkstall Abbey, run by what was at the time City of Leeds Museums. She was responsible for the publication of the medieval ceramics from the site. At the time, the ceramics of medieval Yorkshire were little understood; by working closely with material from the assemblages at Kirkstall Abbey, then St John's Priory, Pontefract, and then from medieval York, Le Patourel was able to extend the sequencing of medieval Yorkshire pottery back further. Building on this site-specific understanding of the pottery, Le Patourel searched for kilns which produced it, exploring documentary sources such as manorial accounts and taxation lists, and utilising place-name evidence. At Winksley, near Ripon, she excavated 14th-century kilns there with C. V. Bellamy.

At the deserted medieval village of Wharram Percy, Le Patourel worked on the ceramics from there with archaeologist John Hurst. Work there led to Le Patourel leading excavations at Knaresborough Castle. This led to further research on moated manors sites, such as West Haddlesey, alongside the formation of the Moated Sites Research Group, which later merged with the Deserted Medieval Village Group to form the Medieval Settlement Research Group. Le Patourel was also a founding member and the first chairman of the Medieval Section of the Yorkshire Archaeological Society.

In combination with her research on medieval ceramics and settlements, Le Patourel lectured at the University of Leeds. In 1967 she was appointed as a Temporary Lecturer in History and Archaeology in the Department of Adult Education and Extra-Mural Studies. This role was made permanent in 1969, and in 1976 she was appointed Associate Lecturer in the Department of Archaeology.

Alongside her work on medieval ceramics, Le Patourel became the world's leading expert on the archaeology of dog collars.

Le Patourel's husband, John, died on 21 July 1981. She died on 20 January 2011. On the day of her funeral, the flag on the Parkinson Building at the University of Leeds was flown at half-mast.

== Honours ==
Le Patourel was elected a Fellow of the Society of Antiquaries in 1960.

== Selected publications ==
- Kirkstall Abbey Excavations: the Pottery, 1950-4
- 'A Cistercian Ware Kiln of the Early Sixteenth Century at Potterton, Yorkshire', Antiquity (1966)
- 'Documentary Evidence and the Medieval Pottery Industry', Medieval Archaeology (1968)
- 'Four Medieval Pottery-Kilns on Woodhouse Farm, Winksley, near Ripon, W. Riding of Yorkshire', Medieval Archaeology (1970)
- The Moated Sites of Yorkshire (1973)
- 'A Select Bibliography of the Publications of John Le Patourel 1935–1975', Northern History (1975)
- 'Les sites fossoyés (moated sites) et leurs problèmes (l'organisation de la recherche en Grande Bretagne)', Revue du Nord (1976)
- 'Documentary Evidence', 'The Excavation of Moated Sites' & 'The Significance of Moated Sites', in Medieval Moated Sites (1978)
- Eds. Hilda Elizabeth Jean Le Patourel, Moira H. Long, May F. Pickles, Yorkshire Boundaries (1993)
- 'The Dog Collar', in Late Viking Age and Medieval Waterford (1997)

== Legacy ==
The British Museum holds a collection of medieval ceramics, donated by Le Patourel, in its collection. These, sometimes fragmentary ceramics, include: an aquamanile from York; bowls, jugs, a kiln fragment, pitchers and skillets from Brandsby; jugs from Shadwell; bowls and jugs from Follifoot; vessels from Wharram Percy; a fragment of and early medieval Otley-type ware vessel from the site of Otley Manor.

== Historiography ==
Le Patourel was a significant figure in post-war archaeology, particularly at a time when the field was dominated by men. Her work The Moated Sites of Yorkshire is still considered a starting point for their study and was described as an "admirable monograph" which shows what "can be obtained from the combination of historical and archaeological evidence from fieldwork, excavation and standing buildings". The Yorkshire Boundaries volume, which she co-edited with an all-woman team, was reviewed as "fascinating to all with an interest in the county".
