= Lilian Lyle =

British botanist and phycologist (1867–1953)

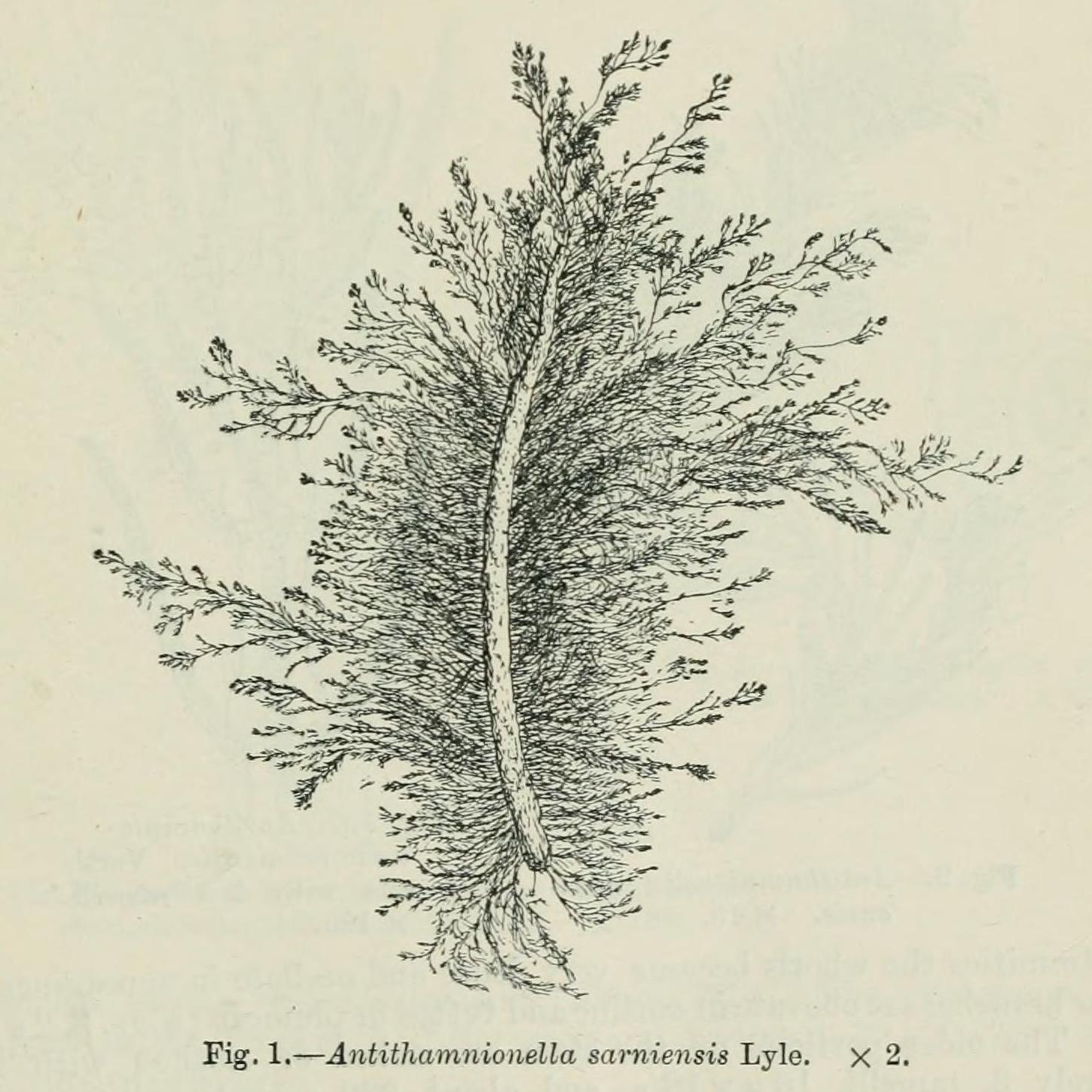
- Antithamnionella sarniensis Lyle, discovered by Lilian Lyle in Guernsey in 1921
- Born: 16 March 1867; Hackney, London
- Died: 6 May 1953 (aged 86); Bromley
- Occupations: Botanist; phycologist; teacher
- Organization: Linnean Society of London
- Notable work: The Marine Algae of Guernsey (1920)

Lilian Lyle (16 March 1867 – 6 May 1953) was a British teacher, botanist, and phycologist who collected and published on a number of algae species during the 1920s. Lyle was elected a Fellow of the Linnean Society of London on 17 June 1915.

== Life ==
Lilian Lyle was born in Hackney, London in 1867, the daughter of Henry B. Lyle, a general practitioner, and Frances S. Lyle (née Bluett).

In Guernsey, Lyle built on the earlier work of Ernest David Marquand to systematically record marine algae. While living in the Channel Islands 1888–1895, Marquand and his wife had recorded the presence and distribution of 236 seaweeds, increasing this to 252 by 1901. Among these were four species previously unrecorded in Britain, including Liebmannia leveillei. Lyle recorded this rarely found species during her own work in 1911, and it has not been found in the UK since.

In 1920, Lyle published The Marine Algae of Guernsey, adding 46 species to Marquand's records for the island. The publication of this had been delayed by the war, but over the course of the following decade, she published several further papers on the seaweeds found among the Channel Islands. Despite their being studied by others, Lyle stated that "one need never despair of making new discoveries" around the Islands, where "in no two years does it seem possible to find all the same algae". This was partly due to the regular arrival of new species, such as Colpomenia peregrina, a brown seaweed not native to the British Isles. Her records in Guernsey were published in the Transactions of the Guernsey Society of Natural Science (later La Société Guernesiaise).

In October 1921, Lyle discovered a new genus of algae, which she wrote about in 'Antithamnionella, A New Genus of Algae', published in the Journal of Botany in 1922. The species bears her name.

Lyle explored Guernsey's marine ecology in detail, and later compared it that found elsewhere. In 1926, for example, Lyle was involved in counting and recording algae growth on hulls, near Scapa Flow in the Orkney Islands. The vessels studied were from a salvaged fleet of German warships, an opportunity 'so unusual as to be valuable' despite the number of years passed since their sinking. The following year, Lyle discussed her experiences examining the fleet before the Linnean Society, illustrating her talk with lantern slides.

Though collecting, pressing, and presenting flowers and seaweeds was a popular pastime during the Victorian period in particular, leading to a number of albums finding their way into museum collections, Lyle's represents the 'one serious academic collection' in the Guille-Allès Museum of Guernsey. Lyle presented this album – containing mounted dried specimens and microscope slides – to the museum, and also donated material to the British Museum and the National Library of Wales.

In her later life, Lyle was still sharing her observations: the Natural History Museum holds a letter written to Dr John Ramsbottom on 18 April 1947 containing a list of flowers found in Tintagel and the surrounding area between 1941 and 1945.

== Death ==
Lilian Lyle died on 6 May 1953 in a nursing home in Bromley, aged 86.

== Selected writings ==
- 'Developmental Forms of Marine Algae', The New Phytologist, Vol. 17, No. 10, December 1918
- 'Antithamnionella, A New Genus of Algae', Journal of Botany: British and foreign, Vol. 60, No. 6, 1922
- The Marine Algae of Guernsey (1920)
- 'Marine Algæ of some German Warships in Scapa Flow and of the Neighbouring Shores', Botanical Journal of the Linnean Society, Vol. 48, No. 321, April 1929
- 'Some Preliminary Notes on the Driftweed around Worthing', Journal of Botany, Vol. 76, 1938
