= Cyananthus microphyllus =

Scientific classification
- Kingdom: Plantae
- Clade: Tracheophytes
- Clade: Angiosperms
- Clade: Eudicots
- Clade: Asterids
- Order: Asterales
- Family: Campanulaceae
- Genus: Cyananthus
- Species: C. microphyllus

Binomial name
- Cyananthus microphyllus Edgew.

Synonyms
- Cyananthus linifolius Wall. ex Hook.f. & Thomson; Cyananthus nepalensis Kitam.

Species of flowering plant

Cyananthus microphyllus, called the small-leaved bluebell-flower, is a species of flowering plant in the genus Cyananthus, native to the western Himalayas, Nepal, and Tibet. It has gained the Royal Horticultural Society's Award of Garden Merit.

== Subtaxa ==
The following subspecies are currently accepted:

- Cyananthus microphyllus subsp. microphyllus
- Cyananthus microphyllus subsp. williamsonii K.K.Shrestha
