= Cyananthus formosus =

Scientific classification
- Kingdom: Plantae
- Clade: Tracheophytes
- Clade: Angiosperms
- Clade: Eudicots
- Clade: Asterids
- Order: Asterales
- Family: Campanulaceae
- Genus: Cyananthus
- Species: C. formosus

Binomial name
- Cyananthus formosus Diels

Synonyms
- Cyananthus chungdienensis C.Y. Wu

Species of flowering plant

Cyananthus formosus is a species of perennial flowering plant in the family Campanulaceae. It is native to grassy slopes and forests of northwest Yunnan in China. In Mandarin the species is known as 美丽蓝钟花 (mei li lan zhong hua). Originally described by Ludwig Diels in 1912 in the Notes of the Royal Botanical Garden Edinburgh, the species is a small, blue-flowered plant suitable for Alpine gardens.

== Description ==
Cyananthus formosus grows to be less than 10 centimetres (3.9 in) tall once mature. Its flowers are a dark violet-blue color and are 2.5–4 centimetres (0.98–1.57 in) in diameter.

The roots are similar to those of carrots and can be up to 1 centimetre (0.39 in) wide. Its rootstock is robust and is often branched. It has persistent scales which are linear or lance-like and 3.3–5 millimetres (0.13–0.20 in) in size. The stems grow in dense tufts and can grow lying down or reaching upwards. They are a pale purple color, slender in width, and anywhere from 5–25 centimetres (2.0–9.8 in) long. They are simple or have short branches.

The leaves alternate along the stem, and the lowest leaves on the stem are scale-like. The leaf blade is oval or rhombus shaped and measures 3–9 millimetres (0.12–0.35 in) by 2–6 millimetres (0.079–0.236 in). The underside of the leaf has dense white hairs, while the upper side either has sparse white hairs or is wholly free of hairs. The base of the leaf has an obtuse or somewhat truncate shape; the edges are curled back and are finely notched with three to five lobes; the apex is also truncate. The leafstalk is 2–7 millimetres (0.079–0.276 in) long.

The flowers are large, ranging from 2.5–4 centimetres (0.98–1.57 in) in diameter. They are solitary on the ends of the main stems and branches, and have a whorl of four or five leaves surrounding them. The pedicels are 3–5 millimetres (0.12–0.20 in) long. The calyx is densely covered with long stiff hairs of a pal brown color. The tube is cylindrical and 7–12 millimetres (0.28–0.47 in) long. The lobes are triangular or nearly so, measuring 4–6 millimetres (0.16–0.24 in) by 2–3.5 millimetres (0.079–0.138 in) in size, with both sides having hairs. The ovary has five locii and is nearly as long as the calyx tube and the style is extended up to the throat of the corolla.

Cyananthus formosus is similar to Cyananthus delavayi. The color of their flowers are particularly similar, being almost the same shade of deep violet-blue. However, C. formosus is noticeably larger, among other minor differences.

== Taxonomy ==
The holotype of the species was collected by George Forrest in either 1906 or 1908. The type location of the specimen was on the eastern flank of the Lijiang mountains. The specimen is now housed at the Royal Botanic Garden Edinburgh.

Cyananthus chungdienensis is a synonym of C. formosus. Originally described in 1965 by Wu Zhengyi as its own species, it is no longer an accepted name.

== Distribution and habitat ==
Cyananthus formosus is found in China in southwest Sichuan and northwest Yunnan near the localities of Muli, Heqing, Lijiang, and Zhongdian. Its habitat is on grassy slopes, in forest glades, on the edges of forests, and among scree, at elevations of 2,800–4,600 metres (3,100–5,000 yd).

== Ecology ==
Cyananthus formosum is a perennial flowering plant which blooms in late spring and early summer. It requires full sun and is hardy in temperatures as low as −40 °C (−40 °F). While it is no longer in cultivation, the species is appropriate for Alpine gardens, and when placed in a container it requires excellent drainage.
