= Ralph Durand =

British writer

Ralph Anthony Durand
- Born: 7 September 1876; Earley, Berkshire, England
- Died: 20 December 1945 (aged 69); Guernsey, Channel Islands
- Resting place: Candie Cemetery, St Peter Port, Guernsey
- Education: Christ's Hospital, Horsham, West Sussex
- Occupations: Writer, librarian
- Spouse(s): Violet Picton-Warlow, 1909-death
- Children: Rosemary Edmonds (adopted)
- Writing career
- Pen name: Anthony Raddle
- Years active: 1911–1945
- Genres: historical fiction, non-fiction, short stories, poetry, articles
- Subjects: German occupation of the Channel Islands, Rudyard Kipling, Oxford
- Notable works: Guernsey under German Rule, A Handbook to the Poetry of Rudyard Kipling
- Notable awards: 'The Mind Healer' – 2nd prize, Collins competition, 1920

Ralph Anthony Durand (7 September 1876 – 20 December 1945) was an award-winning writer of novels, short stories and non-fiction. Much of his early writing was inspired by his travels in Australia and Africa. He served in the Boer War and World War I and was the librarian of the Priaulx Library between 1929 and 1945. He is best remembered for his works of non-fiction, particularly Guernsey Under German Rule, a first hand account of the German occupation of the Channel Islands during World War II.

== Early life ==
Ralph was born on 7 September 1876 in Earley, Berkshire, the son of the Rev Havilland Durand and his wife Mary née Hawtrey, where his father was the rector. The Durand family were descended from Huguenots who had sought refuge in the island of Guernsey following the Revocation of the Edict of Nantes. When his father died in 1884, his mother moved with the family to Guernsey, and Ralph was sent to Christ's Hospital, a boarding school.

Durand left school at the age of sixteen, and travelled to Australia, where an aunt had offered to find him work on a cattle station.

== Travels in Australia and Africa ==
When Durand arrived in Sydney in late 1892, his aunt concluded that the bespectacled 'shy clumsy dreamer' was totally unsuited to life on a cattle station and found him a job in a bank instead. She eventually relented, and persuaded a cattle station owner to take him on for a six-month trial, at the end of which he was sacked. He spent five years in Australia during which he bought shares in a tin-mining venture, worked as sheep shearer, a sugar plantation coolie, cook to a party of cattle drovers and labourer to a feckless Irish farmer. He eventually found a job as a tutor to two boys, and was able to find time to devote to writing. He wrote poetry, short stories and articles, one of which was published in the Sydney Bulletin.

In 1897, he came into an inheritance, and travelled to Salisbury (now Harare, Zimbabwe) and with his brother started a business trading cattle between Nyasaland and Salisbury. He left this venture after a severe illness, and after a period of recovery travelled to South Africa, where he joined Thornycroft's Mounted Infantry, with which he served in the Boer War. Following his discharge, he spent a year as a teacher at Michaelhouse School in Kwazulu Natal, before returning to England to concentrate on becoming a writer.

== Marriage ==
Soon after his return from his travels, he met Violet Picton Warlow, and they were married in 1904. Her father, Colonel John Picton Warlow, had inherited Ewenny Priory and changed his name to Picton Turbervill as a condition of his inheritance. Violet was his eldest daughter in a large family which included Edith Picton-Turbervill, one of the first female members of parliament.

In 1933, they adopted Rosemary Edmondes, the disabled granddaughter of Violet's older brother Charles.

== Writing career ==
=== Fiction ===
His first novel, John Temple was published in 1911 by Macmillan, which received many positive reviews. This was followed by Spacious Days in 1914. His next novel The Mind Healer won second prize in a competition run by Collins, and was also published in the United States. 1928 saw two further novels published Set a Thief and Servants of the King. He also had numerous short stories published in magazines during this period.

=== Non-Fiction ===
In 1909, Grant Richards published Oxford: its Buildings and Gardens. And in 1914, Hodder & Stoughton published A Handbook to the Poetry of Rudyard Kipling, for which he corresponded with Kipling, who approved of the work, and is also highly regarded by Kipling scholars. He also wrote articles for magazines, including a long biographical article on his travels in Australia and Africa for Pall Mall Magazine.

== World War 1 ==
Despite being thirty-eight years old in 1914, Durand volunteered and joined the West Kent Yeomanry as squadron cook. In early 1915, he gained a commission in the 22nd (Kensington) Battalion, Royal Fusiliers. In 1916 he was sent to France, where he first saw active service at the Battle of the Somme, but after an attack of gall stones, he was invalided back to England by the end of that year. He then transferred to the newly formed Royal Guernsey Light Infantry, returning to France with them in 1917, but after another gall stone attack, he was again returned home, where a medical board assessed him as fit only for home duties. He was assigned to a desk job in MI5, from where he was sent to Italy, where he spent the rest of the war. He returned to London in early 1919, and after another gall stone attack, he underwent an operation to remove his gall bladder. He was demobilised in September 1919.

== Librarian ==
In 1929, Ralph Durand successfully applied for the post of Librarian at the Priaulx Library. He continued to write and publish books, and was elected to the Council of La Société Guernesiaise, contributing articles on Guernsey history to their journal, Transactions.

== World War 2 ==
In 1940, when German forces occupied the island, Durand was asked by the Bailiff, Victor Carey, to keep an official account of the period. His account focuses on the impact of the occupation on the civilian population, and provides a harrowing account of the shortages of fuel and food, which became particularly acute in the period after D-Day, when the liberation of Normandy cut off German supply lines.

After the confiscation of radio sets in 1942, Durand also became part of the Guernsey Underground News Service (GUNS), which secretly distributed transcripts of BBC news around the island. Durand used to conceal a copy of each news sheet inside a specially-appointed book within the library for islanders to read.

Durand's account Guernsey Under German Rule was originally scheduled for publication in late 1945, but was delayed, firstly due to post-war shortages of printing materials and staff, and then by the death of the author in December 1945. It was eventually published in June 1946 by the Guernsey Society. Although it quickly went out of print, it has been widely recognised as an important account of this period. Ambrose Sherwill (later Sir), who was President of the Controlling Committee in 1940, and became Bailiff of Guernsey shortly after the war, wrote:

I greatly regret that Ralph Durand’s Guernsey Under German Rule published by the Guernsey Society is long since out of print. It is less readable than Islands in Danger, but, in its content, is in my opinion, much superior to it. It contains masses of information available generally in no other publication.

== Death ==
Ralph Durand died in December 1945. His death certificate records the cause of death as '"acute bronchitis, asthma and cardiac failure"', but the effects of malnutrition, particularly during the last year of the occupation, had left him very weak. He was buried in the Maingay vault, the family of his paternal grandmother, in Candie Cemetery, St Peter Port.
