= Samuel Elliott Hoskins =

Samuel Elliott Hoskins (1799–1888) was a British physician.

== Life ==
Hoskins was born at Guernsey in 1799. His father, Samuel Hoskins, a native of Honiton, Devon, England, was in business at 66 Mark Lane, London, with the firm of Merrick, Hoskins, & Co. till 1798, when he went to Guernsey and, marrying Miss Elizabeth Oliver, remained there during the remainder of his life.

Hoskins was educated at Topsham and Exeter, and, destined for the Guernsey bar was placed under Advocate Charles de Jersey. After a year he gave up the law for medicine. From 1818 to 1820 he was at the united hospitals of Guy's and St. Thomas's, London. He passed as a licentiate of the Society of Apothecaries in 1821, as a member of the Royal College of Surgeons of England in 1822, as an extra licentiate of the Royal College of Physicians in 1834, and a fellow in 1859. While a student he came to know Astley Cooper, Samuel Taylor Coleridge, Charles Lamb, Thomas De Quincey, Thomas Talfourd, and Douglas William Jerrold. After passing his surgical examination he returned to Guernsey and entered into partnership with his old instructor, Dr. Brock. He studied for a short time in Paris in 1827, and settled finally in the Channel Islands.

In 1859 he retired from his profession, leaving his practice in the hands of a partner, and devoted himself to historical research. He died at York Place, Candie Road, Guernsey, on 12 October 1888, and was buried in Candie Cemetery.

== Works ==
Soon after settling down he elaborated a chart of stethoscopic signs, and carried out an investigation into the solubility of calculi within the body. The former work was favourably reviewed, and passed into a second edition. The latter occupied many years of his life. His results presented to the Royal Society gained his election to a fellowship on 25 May 1843. His observations on the climatology of Guernsey were at the time unique. His paper on the origin and progress of cholera and small-pox in 1849 was written at the request of the Epidemiological Society.

1. A Stethoscopic Chart, in which may be seen at one View the Application of Auscultation and Percussion to the Diagnosis of Thoracic Disease, 1830.
2. On the Chemical Discrimination of Vesical Calculi, a translation of Scharling's work, 1842.
3. Tables of Corrections for Temperature to Barometric Observations, 1842.
4. Report on Cholera and Small-pox. By S. E. Hoskins and Thomas L. Mansell, 1850.
5. Home Resorts for Invalids in the Climate of Guernsey, 1852.
6. Louis le Grand, or Fontainbleau and Versailles, a Comedy in three Acts, 1852.
7. Charles the Second in the Channel Islands, 1854, 2 vols.
8. Relations de la Normandie et de la Bretagne avec les îles de la Manche pendant l'émigration, d'après des documents recueillis par S. E. Hoskins. Par Charles Hettier, 1885.

He also published papers on The Carved Oak Chests of the Channel Islands, and The Outposts of England.

== Family ==
He married in 1830 Harriet Rowley, daughter of Thomas and Harriet Le Merchant MacCulloch, and sister of Sir Edward MacCulloch, bailiff of Guernsey. She died at Guernsey on 12 March 1889. Their only son, Edgar Hoskins, was rector of St. Mary Magdalen with St. Gregory by St. Paul, London.
