= James Marr (author) =

James Marr (1918–2009) was the author of The History of Guernsey, acclaimed on publication in 1982 as the most important book on the islands since Ferdinand Tupper's history more than a century earlier.

Marr was the son of Leonard and Elvina (née Machon) Marr and was born at their family home in Les Canichers, Saint Peter Port, Guernsey. He was educated at Les Vauxbelets College, Guernsey, and the College of St Mark and St John, London, graduating with honours in economics and political science. During World War II, he served in the British Army in France, North Africa, Italy and Austria. He was a schoolmaster at Hackney Downs, London, specialising in his subjects, and simultaneously taking history.

Other books by James Marr on historical aspects of Guernsey include: Guernsey People; More People in Guernsey's Story; Bailiwick Bastions; Bailiwick Harbours and Landing Places; and Guernsey Between the Wars: An Islander Recalls his Youth. He wrote a fictional trilogy, Two Men and a Woman, set in the island, and was a regular contributor to The Review of the Guernsey Society.
