= Donald Banks =

British civil servant

Major-General Sir Donald Banks KCB DSO MC TD
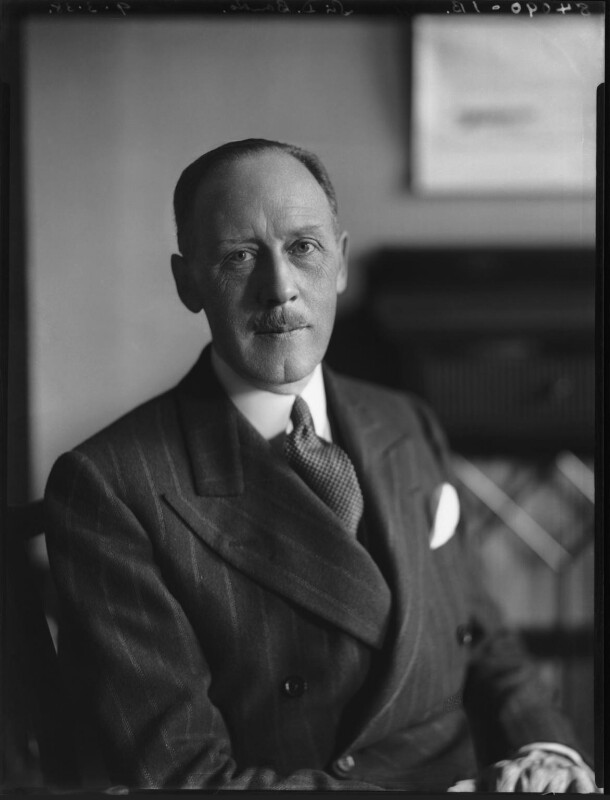
- Banks in 1938
- Born: Thomas MacDonald Banks; 31 March 1891; St Peter Port, Guernsey, Channel Islands
- Died: 11 July 1975 (aged 84); New Forest, Hampshire, England
- Occupations: Civil servant, company director
- Spouse(s): (1) Dorothea Webster (2) Elizabeth Bradley

Major-General Sir Thomas MacDonald "Donald" Banks KCB DSO MC TD (31 March 1891 – 11 July 1975) was a British Army officer, senior civil servant and a founder member and first Chairman of the Guernsey Society.

== Family ==
Banks was born in Guernsey on 31 March 1891, the son of Thomas Brownsort Banks, a stationer, and Margaret Elizabeth (née Roebuck). He had an elder sister, Blanche, and a younger brother, Maurice Rowley.

He married Dorothea Webster, and they had one daughter, Dawn Louise, born in 1932. They lived in Lymington, Hampshire. Dorothea died in 1947.

In 1948, Sir Donald married Elizabeth Bradley of Lymington, and they had two children together. They moved to Cadnam Lodge in the New Forest, where he kept a herd of Guernsey cattle.

== Early years ==
He attended Elizabeth College, Guernsey between 1899 and 1909, where he was in the Shooting VIII 1908–9.

== Career ==
He entered the Civil Service in 1909 in the Exchequer and Audit Department. In 1914, he passed the Civil Service Examination, and was appointed to the Secretary's Office of the General Post Office (GPO).

He saw service in the First World War as commanding officer of the 10th (Service) Battalion Essex Regiment and the 8th Battalion Royal Berkshire Regiment. As a result of his actions, he was awarded the Distinguished Service Order (DSO), Military Cross (MC), the Croix de Guerre, and was mentioned in despatches twice.

After World War I he continued with the Territorial Army, and commanded the Kensington Regiment from 1927 to 1931.

He was Private Secretary to the Secretary of the GPO, and between 1920 and 1923 was Private Secretary to four Postmasters-General in succession. In 1924, he was appointed Deputy Controller of the Post Office Savings Bank, and became Controller in 1931. He became first Director-General of the Post Office in 1934, where he was responsible for the introduction of the emergency service '999', as well as the speaking clock ('TIM'). He was knighted in the New Years' Honours List of 1935.

In 1936, he transferred to the Air Ministry, where he was appointed Permanent Secretary, in 1938 becoming first Permanent Under Secretary of State for Air. He was responsible for setting up the Empire Air Training Scheme, and travelled to Australia and New Zealand to discuss the manufacture of aircraft there.

The Second World War he returned to military service, and was adjutant and Quartermaster General of the 50th (Northumbrian) Division. He served in the British Expenditionary Force (BEF) in 1940, and was mentioned in despatches. He became a major-general in 1943. From 1940 to 1945 he was Director-General of the Petroleum Warfare Department, which developed innovative applications for petrol during the conflict, include Fog Investigation and Dispersal Operation FIDO, (fog dispersal at airports), and PLUTO (pipeline under the ocean taking fuels from England to Europe during and after the invasion build-up).

In 1946, he was awarded Legion of Merit, Degree of Commander by the President of the United States of America. The citation reads:

"Major-General Sir Donald Banks, British Army Director General, Petroleum Warfare Department, Ministry of Fuel and Power, performed outstanding services in the European Theater of Operations from March 1943 to November 1944, by assisting in the production and manufacture of an improved American flamethrower fuel. His department cooperated fully with the American Forces and adapted the Crocodile mechanical flamethrower to the Sherman tank, and trained American personnel in its operation and maintenance. He also provided the Ninth United States Army Air Force with a field mixing unit which was employed during the Normandy campaign. General Banks cooperation and keen understanding of the problems involved, contributed substantially to the successful prosecution of the war."

After World War II, he resumed his civil service career in the Air Ministry. Sir Donald was Head of the United Kingdom delegation to the International Civil Aviation Organization at Montreal in 1946, and Deputy Chairman of the Air Transport Advisory Council 1947–51. He was also a Director of De La Rue and Standard Telephones and Cables, and Chairman of the Anglo-Chinese Chamber of Commerce 1946–54.

In 1956, through his role with De La Rue, he became Master of the Worshipful Company of Makers of Playing Cards.

In his obituary, The Daily Telegraph described him as "a man of ideas whose versatility contributed much to the national well-being in war and peace".

== Guernsey Society ==
Sir Donald was most concerned with the welfare of his fellow islanders exiled as a result of the German occupation of the Channel Islands, and was in constant touch with the Home Office and Civil Servants responsible for the welfare of evacuees. He felt that there must be an informed voice and body of opinion among exiled Guernseymen and women that could influence the British Government, and assist the insular authorities after the hostilities were over.

In 1942, he was approached by the Home Office to see if anything could be done to get over a reassuring message to the islanders, as it was known that, despite the fact that German authorities had banned radios, that the BBC was still being picked up secretly in Guernsey and Jersey. It was broadcast by the BBC on 24 April 1942.

He was instrumental in the founding of the Guernsey Society in 1943, as well as the publication of Nos Iles by the Channel Islands Study Group, following a symposium in Oxford in 1944.

Sir Donald served as Chairman of the Guernsey Society from its formation in 1943 until the end of 1946, when he was appointed vice president. He was succeeded as chairman by Commander Esten De Jersey.

== Legacy ==
In 2019, the States of Guernsey Blue Plaques Committee decided that a Blue Plaque in honour of Sir Donald Banks would be erected on his childhood home, 43 High Street in St Peter Port.

It was due to be unveiled on 8 May 2020, but was postponed due to the COVID-19 pandemic. It was eventually unveiled on 8 May 2023 by Sir Richard McMahon, Bailiff of Guernsey and Stephen Foote, vice-chairman of The Guernsey Society, with a guard of honour provided by the 10th Essex Living History Group, who model themselves on Banks' World War 1 Regiment.

== Bibliography ==
- Banks, TM and Chell RA, With the 10th Essex in France, 1921
- Channel Islands Study Group, Nos Iles – A Symposium on the Channel Islands, Teddington, 1944
- Banks, Sir Donald, Flame over Britain: A Personal Narrative of Petroleum Warfare, London 1946
- Banks, Sir Donald, Sand and Granite, Review of the Guernsey Society, Spring 1967 - the text of the talk on the Channel Islands that the BBC broadcast on 24 April 1942.
- Banks, Sir Donald, Across the Channel - the Memoirs of Major-General Sir Donald Banks (Blue Ormer, 2020)

Government offices
Preceded by Sir Christopher Bullock	Permanent Secretary of the Air Ministry; 1936–1938	Succeeded by Sir Arthur Street
