= Marie Ozanne =

British major in The Salvation Army

Marie Ozanne (1906 – 25 February 1943) was a major in The Salvation Army, and publicly protested about the treatment of prisoners of war as slave labourers by the German army during the Second World War.

== Early life ==
Ozanne was born on Guernsey in 1906. In 1923, she went to London and received Salvation Army training. She was serving in France and Belgium just before the Second World War started, but then she returned to Guernsey in 1940. The German Army occupied the Channel Islands on 30 June 1940.

== German Occupation ==
Ozanne remained in Guernsey, even though the Germans banned the Salvation Army. She spoke out against the way the German occupiers abused both local workers and shipped-in POW labourers. She preached in St. Peter Port, cared for two children, taught music and studied German.

The Germans took her Salvation Army uniform. She wrote letters to the German Feldkommandant, protesting against the closing of the Salvation Army Halls, their treatment of Jews and other maltreatment of local people. In September 1942, the German authorities arrested her and had her placed under house imprisonment with a Guernsey police officer. Although she became very ill, she continued her protests until her death.

== Death ==
Ozanne died of peritonitis on 25 February 1943. She was 37.

== Legacy ==
Ozanne was posthumously awarded the Salvation Army's highest honour, the Order of the Founder, in 1947.

A blue plaque in her honour was unveiled at her former home in the Vale, which is near St Sampson, on 23 February 2013. She was the first woman and the first non-artist awarded a plaque. She features on the 'Notable Women of Guernsey' walking trail.
