= Jenny Kendall-Tobias =

Jenny Kendall-Tobias (born Guernsey 1967) is a presenter on BBC Guernsey, where she did present the mid-morning show (10:00 am to 2 pm) featuring local news, interviews and music.

== Life in media ==
After studying as a flautist and singer at London College of Music, Jenny worked as an actress, food writer and freelance journalist in London and Brussels before joining BBC Guernsey on 1 October 2001.

Guernsey's most interesting residents as subjects for telephone, ISDN or studio interviews during her regular programme, which she presented Monday to Thursday from ten in the morning to one in the afternoon, and was produced by Tom Girard from January 2005 until June 2006

After broadcasting an interview with two leading British BookCrossers on 7 November 2005, Kendall-Tobias rapidly gained an international following, with regular listeners in the U.S., Australia, New Zealand, Borneo and Vietnam.

On 17 November 2005 Kendall-Tobias established a new world record for the most people interviewed during a radio program - 60.

On 21 March 2006 Kendall-Tobias did the Tim Tam Slam live on air. Her inexperience showed when she left the withdrawal too long and revealed to listeners that the bottom of her cup was now "very gloopy".

As of 12 October 2020, Kendall-Tobias was off (on) sick (leave) indefinitely due to ill health and had not broadcast her morning show since 9 October 2020. She now no longer broadcasts for BBC Radio Guernsey.

== External activities ==
Jenny Kendall-Tobias was arrested by the Guernsey Special Constabulary on 9 December 2004, and charged with being a notorious public figure on the island's roads and detained until she could raise at least £750. After a few hours she had attracted £1,265 from supporters, the funds being donated to the Cancer and Leukaemia in Childhood (CLIC) charity.

Jenny poses for the audience

Over Easter 2006 she participated in an amateur dramatic production of Singin' in the Rain where she played multiple roles as a radio cinema critic and a scantily-dressed showgirl.

She is also on a number of charity committees and actively promotes Guernsey tourism whenever she can.

== External sources ==
- BBC Guernsey
