= John Le Patourel =

British medieval historian

John Le Patourel FBA
- Born: 29 July 1909; Guernsey
- Died: 22 July 1981 (aged 71)
- Spouse: Jean Le Patourel (m. 1939)
- Relatives: Herbert Le Patourel VC (brother)

Academic background
- Education: Elizabeth College, Guernsey
- Alma mater: Jesus College, Oxford

Academic work
- Discipline: Medieval history
- Institutions: University of Leeds
- Notable works: The Norman Empire

John Herbert Le Patourel (29 July 1909 – 22 July 1981) was a British medieval historian and professor at the University of Leeds.

== Biography ==
Le Patourel was born on 29 July 1909 in Guernsey, where his father, Herbert Augustus Le Patourel, was the procureur (Attorney General) from 1929 to 1934. He was educated at Elizabeth College, Guernsey and Jesus College, Oxford where he obtained a BA in Modern History in 1931 followed by a DPhil. In 1939 he married (Hilda Elizabeth) Jean Bird (1915–2011), who became an expert in medieval ceramics and was a Lecturer in Archaeology at the University of Leeds from 1967 to 1980. They had a daughter and three sons. His brother, Herbert Wallace Le Patourel, was awarded the Victoria Cross in World War II.

== Career ==
Le Patourel's academic career began at University College, London, where he was appointed Assistant Lecturer in 1933, Lecturer in 1936 and Reader in Medieval History in 1943. In 1945, he became Professor of Medieval History at the University of Leeds, a post he held until 1970. He was then a Research Professor at Leeds until 1974 when he retired with the title Emeritus Professor. He was also Director of the Graduate Centre for Medieval Studies from 1967 to 1970.

Le Patourel was elected a Fellow of the British Academy in 1972. He died on 22 July 1981.

== Work ==
Much of Le Patourel's academic writing concerned the history of Guernsey and the other Channel Islands. He was Archivist to the Royal Court of Guernsey from 1946 onwards. His first book, The Medieval Administration of the Channel Islands, was published in 1937, based on his Oxford doctoral thesis. Other works included The Manor and Borough of Leeds, 1066–1400 (1957), The Building of Castle Cornet, Guernsey (1958) and The Norman Empire (1976). His papers and personal collection of books and materials relating to the Channel Islands was donated to the University of Leeds by his widow. His archives are now held at Special Collections in the Brotherton Library.

Le Patourel was a founder member of the Guernsey Society, which was established in 1943 to represent the interests of the Nazi-occupied island to the British Authorities.

== Legacy ==
In 1979, the graduate student research office at the Institute for Medieval Studies was named the "Le Patourel Room" in Le Patourel's honour.

On 18 July 2015, a blue plaque was unveiled at Le Patourel's childhood home in Fosse André, St Peter Port, Guernsey, celebrating the lives of Le Patourel and his brother, Wallace.
