= Wallace Le Patourel =

British army officer & recipient of the Victoria Cross (1916-1979)

- Born: Herbert Wallace Le Patourel; 20 June 1916; Guernsey, Channel Islands
- Died: 4 September 1979 (aged 63); Chewton Mendip, Somerset, England
- Relatives: Professor John Le Patourel (brother); Sir William Ehrman (son-in-law)
- Military career
- Allegiance: United Kingdom
- Branch: British Army
- Service years: 1938–1962
- Rank: Brigadier
- Service number: 72117
- Units: Royal Hampshire Regiment
- Conflicts: World War II
- Awards: Victoria Cross; Mentioned in dispatches

Brigadier Herbert Wallace Le Patourel VC (20 June 1916 – 4 September 1979) was a British recipient of the Victoria Cross, the highest award for gallantry in the face of the enemy that can be awarded to British and Commonwealth forces.

== Early life ==
Le Patourel was born in Guernsey, Channel Islands on 20 June 1916. His father, Herbert Augustus Le Patourel, was procureur (Attorney General) of Guernsey from 1929 to 1934. He was educated at Elizabeth College, Guernsey, and represented the school at shooting and hockey. On leaving school he worked as a bank clerk from 1934 to 1937. He joined the British Army, being commissioned a second lieutenant into the Hampshire Regiment in 1938 and was promoted to captain in 1941, during the Second World War.

== VC details ==
Le Patourel was 26 years old, and a temporary major in the 2nd Battalion, Hampshire Regiment (later the Royal Hampshire Regiment), British Army during the Second World War when the following deed took place for which he was awarded the Victoria Cross.

On 3 December 1942 at Tebourba, Tunisia, enemy forces were holding high ground and resisting all efforts in dislodge them. Le Patourel called for four volunteers to go with him and they attacked and silenced several of the machine-gun posts. When all his men became casualties, he went on alone to engage the enemy, using his pistol and hurling hand grenades.

Initial reports from other wounded soldiers suggested that Le Patourel had been killed in action, and he was awarded the VC posthumously. He was later discovered to have survived, been taken prisoner and was in hospital in Italy. He was repatriated in 1943, and awarded his Victoria Cross at a ceremony in Cairo, Egypt.

== Later career ==
Shortly after his repatriation, Le Patourel returned to active service. He went on to serve as brigade major in north-western Europe 1944–45 where he was mentioned in dispatches. In November 1945, he was appointed an Instructor at the Staff College, Quetta, and was promoted to lieutenant colonel. He later achieved the rank of brigadier.

He paid an official visit to his native Guernsey at its Liberation in 1945, and was officially welcomed home by the States of Guernsey on the anniversary of the liberation in 1948.

Le Patourel was later appointed as a Deputy Lieutenant of the County of Avon, and was a director of Harveys of Bristol from 1969.

He married Babette Theresa Beattie in 1949, and had two daughters. One daughter, Penelope Ann Le Patourel, is the wife of Sir William Ehrman. His brother, John Le Patourel, FBA, was Professor of Medieval History at the University of Leeds from 1945 to 1974.

In 2002, a series of six postage stamps was issued by Guernsey Post depicting Le Patourel's life. On 18 July 2015, a blue plaque was unveiled on his childhood home, celebrating the lives of Le Patourel and his brother, John.

== The medal ==
Le Patourel's Victoria Cross is displayed in the Royal Hampshire Regiment Museum, Lower Barracks, Winchester, England.

== See also ==
- List of Channel Islands Victoria Cross recipients
