= Linda Martel =

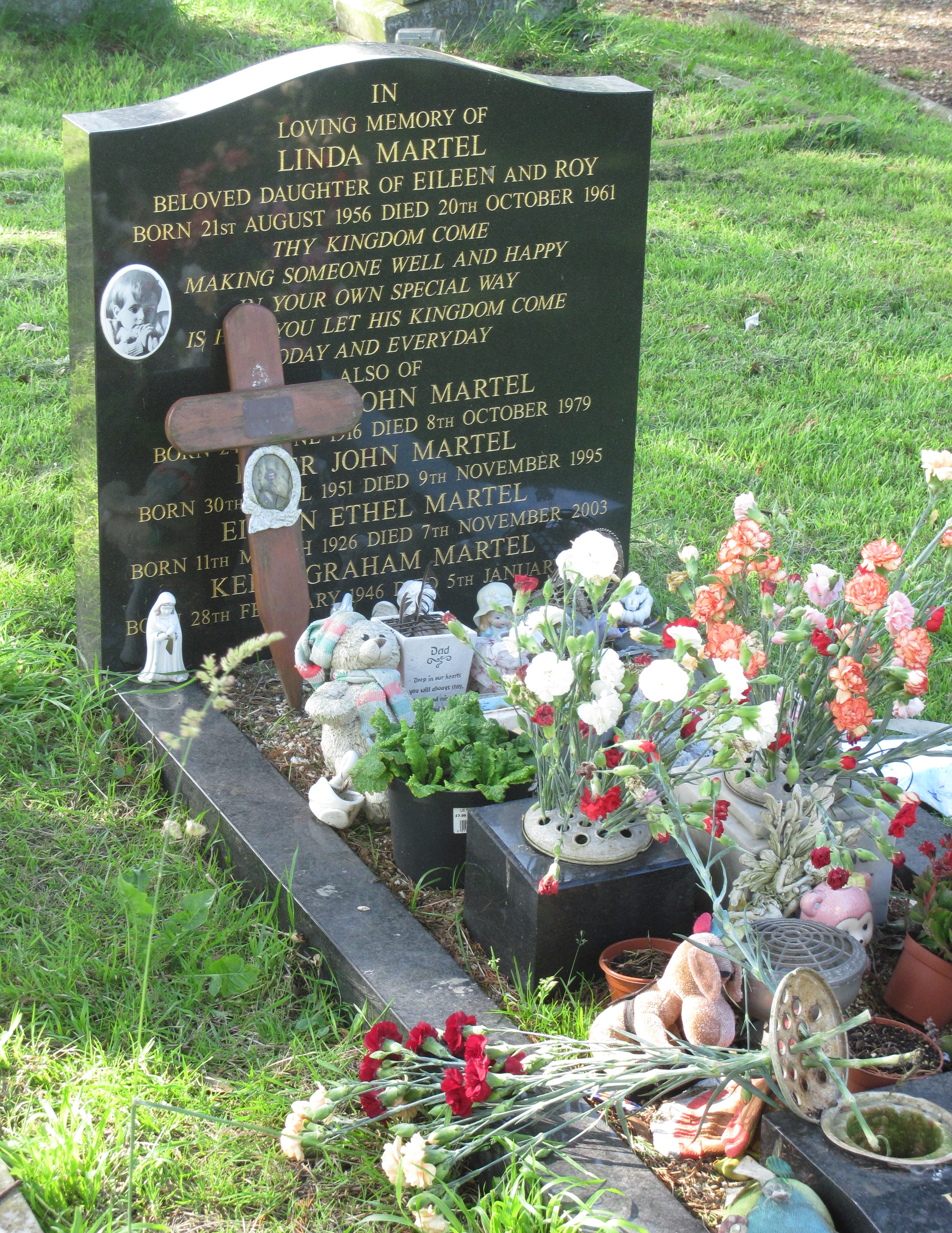
- her grave in 2012
- Born: 21 August 1956; Saint Peter Port
- Died: 20 October 1961 (aged 5); Saint Sampson
- Known for: Healing

Linda Martel (21 August 1956 – 20 October 1961) was known during her brief life in the Channel Islands as a healer. After her death, cures continued to be reported and books discuss the phenomena.

== Life ==
Martel was born in Saint Peter Port in 1956. Her parents were Eileen Ethel (born Allchin) and John Royston (Roy) Martel and she was the fifth of their six children. Martel was not well. She was born with paralysed legs, spina bifida, and hydrocephalus. Her doctor estimated that she might live for a year. After about ten days she was transferred to St Peter Port Hospital where she was baptised. Her head was getting larger and her imminent death was mistakenly predicted. Her symptoms were relieved in Liverpool when she was 15 months old where she was given a new treatment for hydrocephalus at Alder Hey Hospital. However, she was still in the hospital until she was two and three quarters.

Her parents believed that Linda could see other people's ailments and that some were cured by her touching the offending parts of their bodies. They would send out her handkerchiefs to enquirers who would use the cloth to relieve their symptoms. Linda hated church buildings but she would talk of Jesus and Mary even though her parents were very religious.

Martel died at her home in Saint Sampson on 20 October 1961. She had told her father the day before she died that Jesus Christ had visited her. Her father, knowing her fear of churches, made arrangements that her funeral service would be held in the churchyard of Saint Sampson's Church. After the service her parents allowed people to take scraps of material that had belonged to Linda in the hope that they may have healing powers. Some of the visitors took soil from the churchyard.

In 1968, Charles Graves wrote about his investigations of the cures and his conclusion was that the diseases that were cured were psychosomatic. In 1972, Linda Martel's father took his manuscript to James Stevens Cox who was a local publisher and ex-police detective. He checked the accounts and was surprised to find that several people had not believed that Linda's powers could cure them, but despite that, they felt cured and that she was responsible.

In 2010 a Northampton woman reported that she had been cured of bone cancer due to Linda Martel's intervention. A friend had given a piece of cloth that had been Martel's.

== Book ==
- Linda Martel: Little Healer, 1990
