= Ernest David Marquand =

English botanist (1848–1918)

Ernest David Marquand (1848–1918) was an English botanist, perhaps best known as the author of Flora of Guernsey. His son was the noted botanist Cecil Victor Boley Marquand.

Ernest Marquand was educated in New York, and worked mostly in herbaria, notably at the British Museum. He also collected in the Channel Islands and Germany, often with Herbert Airy Shaw.

== Selective publications ==
- 1897. Additional Guernsey fungi. 7 pp.
- 1891. The cryptogamic flora of Kelvedon and its neighbourhood, together with a few coast species
- 1891. The flora of Guernsey. 23 pp.
- 1897. The fungi of Guernsey. 19 pp.
- 1901. Flora of Guernsey and the Lesser Channel Islands; Namely Alderney, Sark, Herm, Jethou, and the Adjacent Islets. with Five Maps. Ed. General Books. 388 pp. Republished 2009 ISBN 1150215461
- 1904. The spiders of Guernsey. 17 pp.
- 1905. The Guernsey dialect and its plant names. 17 pp.
- 1908. The Guernsey dialect names of birds, fishes, insects, &c. 20 pp.
