= Ferdinand Brock Tupper =

British historian

Ferdinand Brock Tupper (1795–1874), was one of the leading historians of the Channel Islands.

== Life ==
Brock Tupper was born in Guernsey in 1795 to parents John Elisha Tupper (shipowner and merchant from Les Cotils and Carrefour in Guernsey) and Elizabeth Brock (1767–1847), sister of Sir Isaac Brock.

In 1845, Brock Tupper published The Life and Correspondence of Sir Isaac Brock, KB, which contains a wealth of information on General Brock and the War of 1812. After a near-mutiny at Fort George, Ontario, it was Tupper who reported by letter on the courts-martial (and subsequent executions of several) of the accused to Brock, and evidently corresponded with the General until the latter's death at the Battle of Queenston Heights.

Brock Tupper went on to publish Chronicles of Castle Cornet with details of its nine years siege during the civil wars, and frequent notices of the Channel Islands in 1851 and History of Guernsey and its Bailiwick; with occasional notices of Jersey in 1854. The latter remained the definitive reference work on the history of Guernsey until the publication of History of the Bailiwick of Guernsey by James Marr in 1982.

Brock Tupper married Mary Ann Herbert, and they had two daughters, Henrietta and Emily.

He died in 1874 leaving his elder daughter, Henrietta, as his literary executrix.

According to Henry Nicholas Paint, Point Tupper, Nova Scotia is named after Brock Tupper.
