= Cecil Victor Boley Marquand =

English botanist (1897–1943)

Cecil Victor Boley Marquand (1897–1943) was a prominent English botanist.

Cecil Marquand was born at Richmond, Surrey, on 7 June 1897. He was the only son of Ernest David Marquand, the author of a Flora of Guernsey.

Educated at Elizabeth College, Guernsey, from 1906 to 1910, he attended Lycée Henri-IV in Paris for a year before entering Bedford School (1911-1913). Marquand then went to Christ's College, Cambridge, where he took his B.A. in 1919, proceeding to M.A. in 1922.

Marquand's education was interrupted by service in the British Army during World War I. He first served in the Machine Gun Corps before gaining a commission in the Royal Tank Corps. Marquand's military service ended when he was invalided out from the Tank Corps.

== Career ==
On leaving Cambridge in 1919, Marquand was appointed research assistant, investigating Avena at the new Welsh Plant Breeding Station at Aberystwyth. In 1923, he moved to the Royal Botanic Gardens Kew, where he worked as an assistant in the Herbarium, initially continuing his work on grasses before taking charge of the Chinese section.

Marquand wrote numerous papers on the flora of East Asia, notably on Cyananthus, Buddleja and gentians. His private interest was Bryophytes, which he studied in the Alps and the highlands of Great Britain during his vacations.

== Death ==
His health permanently impaired from the war, Marquand took early retirement from Kew in 1939. He then moved to the isle of Skye in Scotland.

Marquand drowned there on 1 July 1943, while on a boating expedition in search of rare algae.
