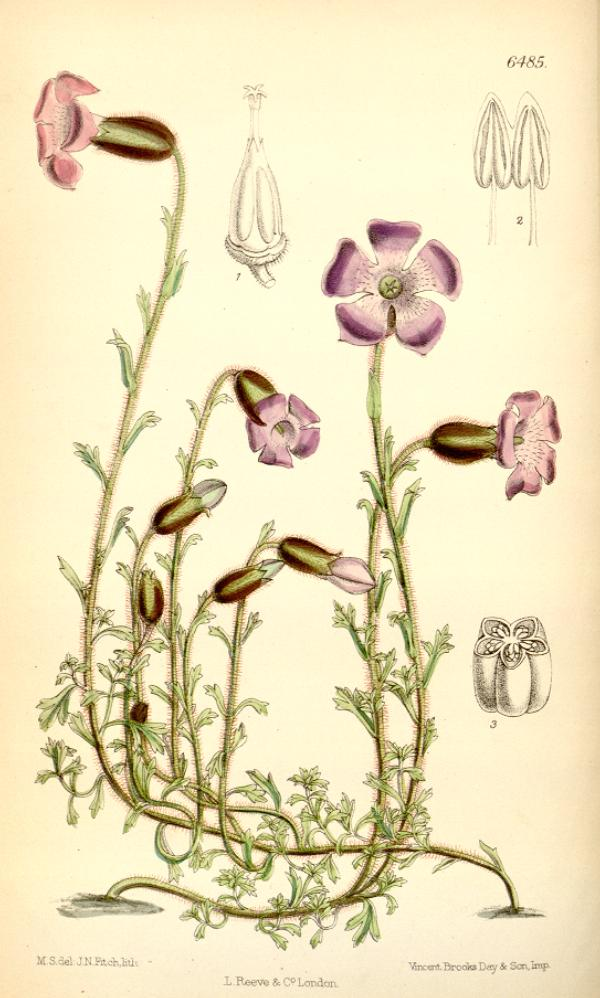
- Cyananthus lobatus

Scientific classification
- Kingdom: Plantae
- Clade: Tracheophytes
- Clade: Angiosperms
- Clade: Eudicots
- Clade: Asterids
- Order: Asterales
- Family: Campanulaceae
- Subfamily: Campanuloideae
- Genus: Cyananthus; Wall. ex Benth. (1836), nom. cons.

Species
- 21; see text

= Cyananthus =

Genus of flowering plants

Cyananthus is a genus of flowering plants that includes 21 species of annual or mostly perennial herbs from high mountains of Central and East Asia. They are little Himalayan plants no higher than 4 in. The name comes from the Greek word for blue flowers. Leaves are usually small and simple, sometimes narrowing to base, tooth-lobed at summit. In August to September, the plants bear showy of bright purplish-blue, yellow or white, funnel to bell-shaped, 5-lobed flowers 1 inch in diameter with stamens free from the corolla and hairy throat. The flowers are borne singly on stalks. They always lose the aerial parts during the coldest months, and as spring begins, stems and leaves quickly start to reproduce.

== Species ==
21 species are accepted.

- Cyananthus cordifolius Duthie
- Cyananthus delavayi Franch.
- Cyananthus fasciculatus C.Marquand
- Cyananthus flavus C.Marquand
- Cyananthus formosus Diels
- Cyananthus hayanus C.Marquand
- Cyananthus himalaicus K.K.Shrestha
- Cyananthus hookeri C.B.Clarke
- Cyananthus incanus Hook.f. & Thomson
- Cyananthus inflatus Hook.f. & Thomson
- Cyananthus integer Wall. ex Benth.
- Cyananthus lichiangensis W.W.Sm.
- Cyananthus integer Wall. ex Benth.
- Cyananthus lobatus Wall. ex Benth.
- Cyanantbus longiflorus Franch.
- Cyananthus macrocalyx Franch.
- Cyananthus microphyllus Edgew.
- Cyananthus pedunculatus C.B.Clarke
- Cyananthus sericeus Y.S.Lian
- Cyananthus sherriffii Cowan
- Cyananthus wardii C.Marquand
