= Marie de Garis =

Guernsey writer (1910–2010)

Marie de Garis MBE (née Le Messurier; 15 June 1910 – 10 August 2010) was a Guernsey author and lexicographer who wrote the Dictiounnaire Angllais-Guernésiais (English-Guernésiais dictionary), the first edition of which was published in 1967. This new work largely superseded George Métivier's Dictionnaire Franco-Normand.

== Biography ==
Born in 1910 in Saint Peter, Guernsey, she published Folklore of Guernsey (1975) and the Glossary of Guernsey place-names. She served as president of La Société Guernesiaise and of L'Assembllaïe d'Guernesiais.

De Garis died in the early hours of 10 August 2010 after being admitted to the Princess Elizabeth Hospital in Saint Andrew, Guernsey.

== Awards and honours ==
In 1999, de Garis received an MBE for her contributions to the preservation of Guernsey culture. She turned 100 in 2010.
