= Priaulx Library =

Coordinates: 49.459156°N 2.541938°W

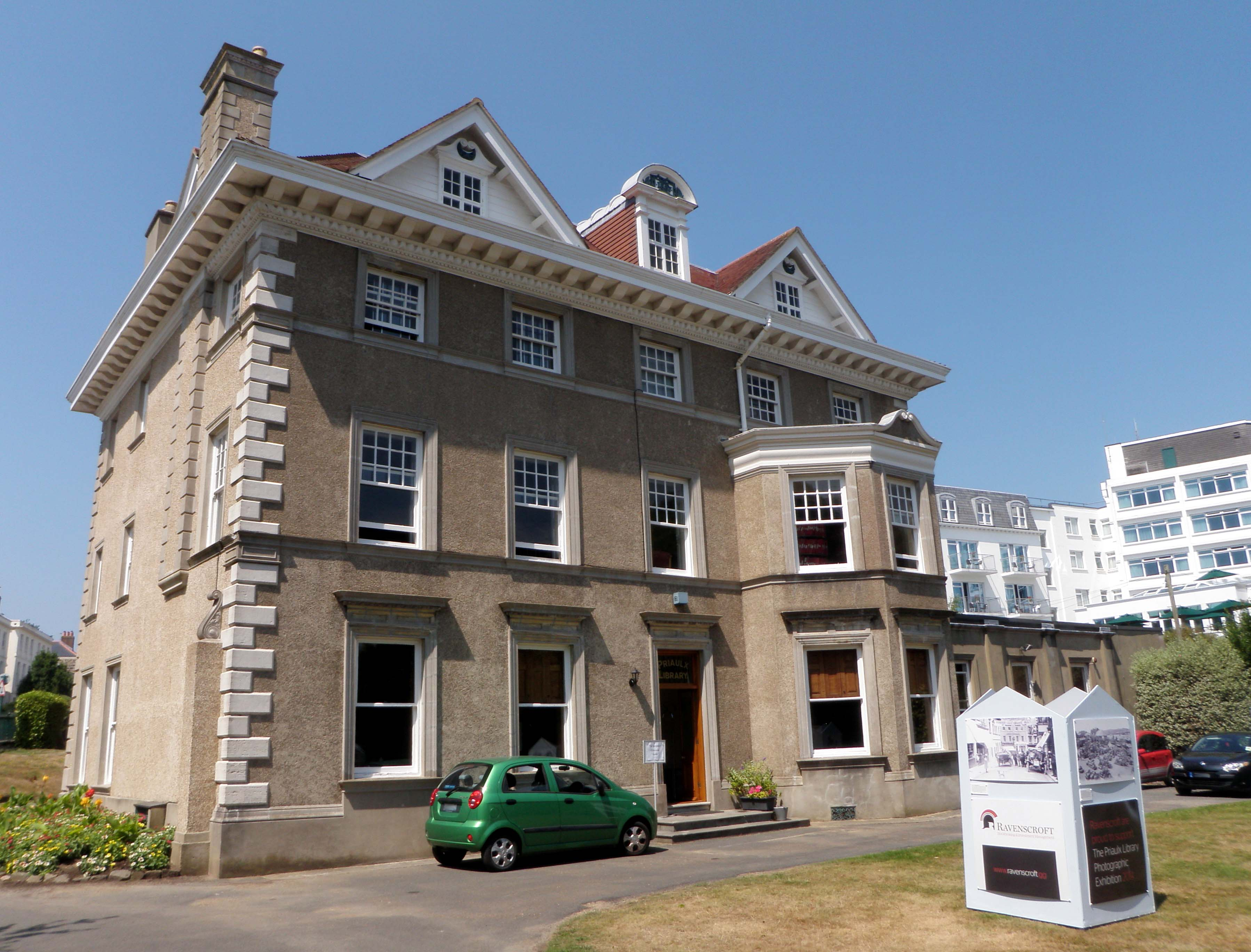
Priaulx Library (2014)

The Priaulx Library, located in St Peter Port, Guernsey, contains the island's principal collection of local and family history.

== History ==
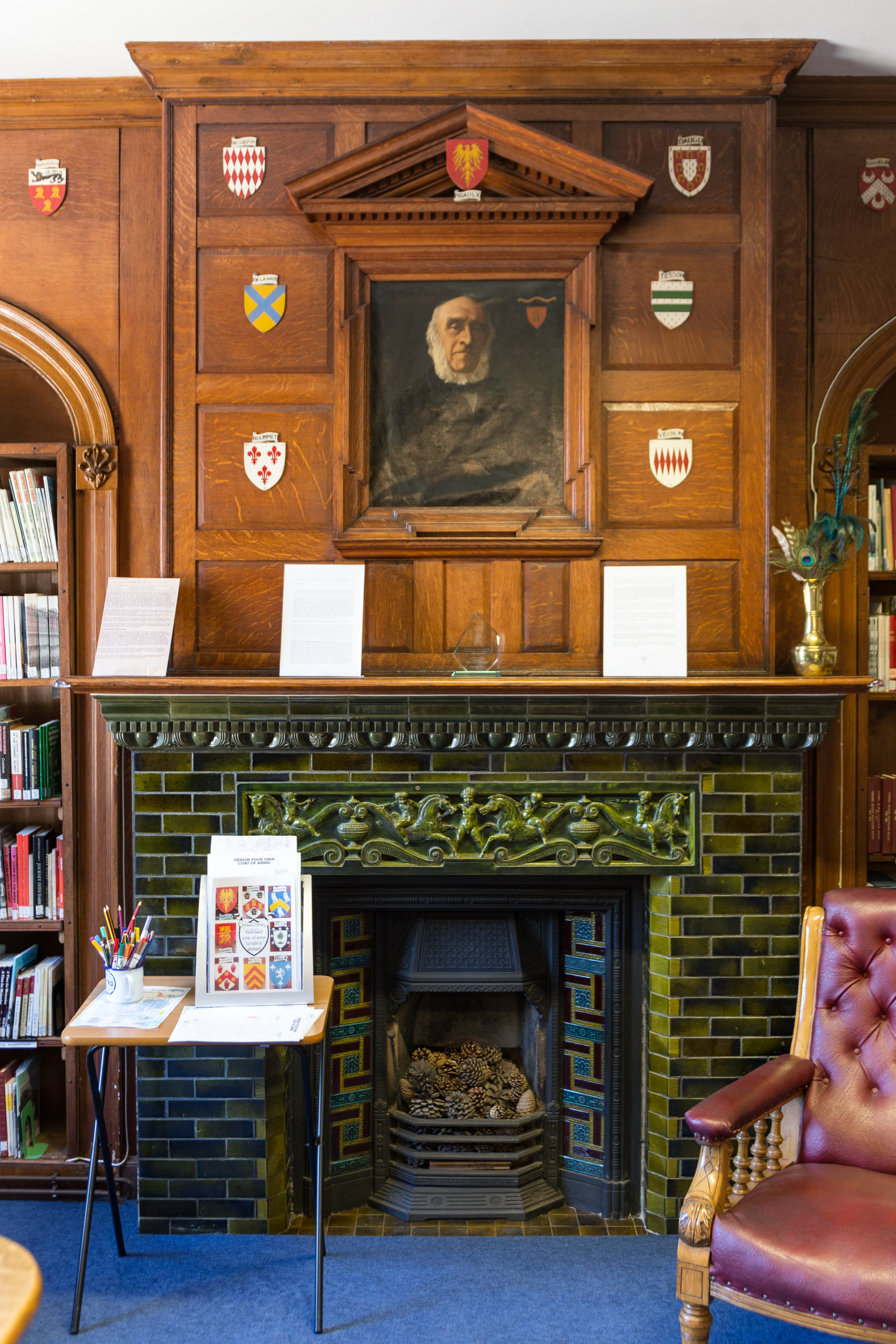
Portrait of Osmond de Beauvoir Priaulx

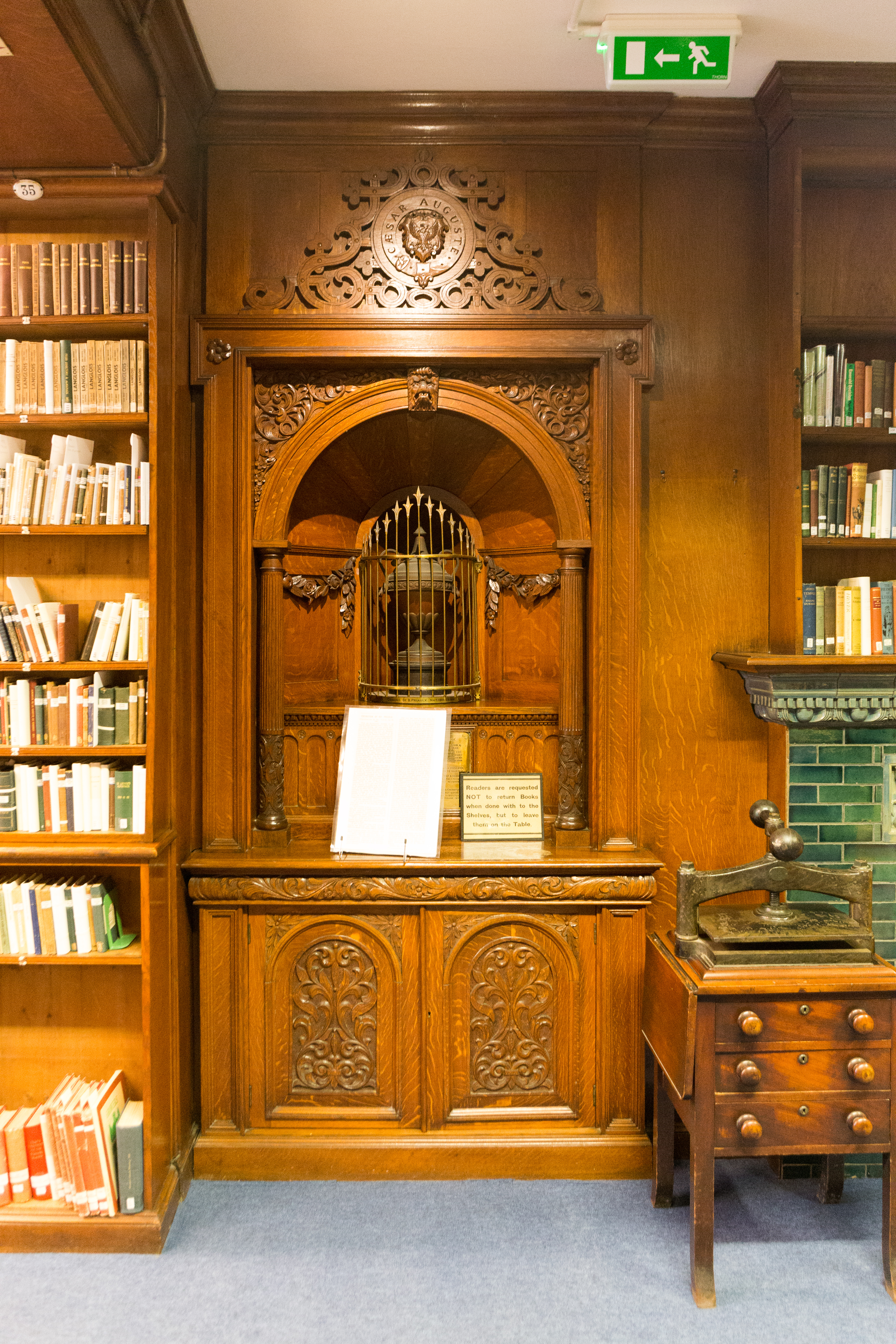
Urn of Osmond de Beauvoir Priaulx.

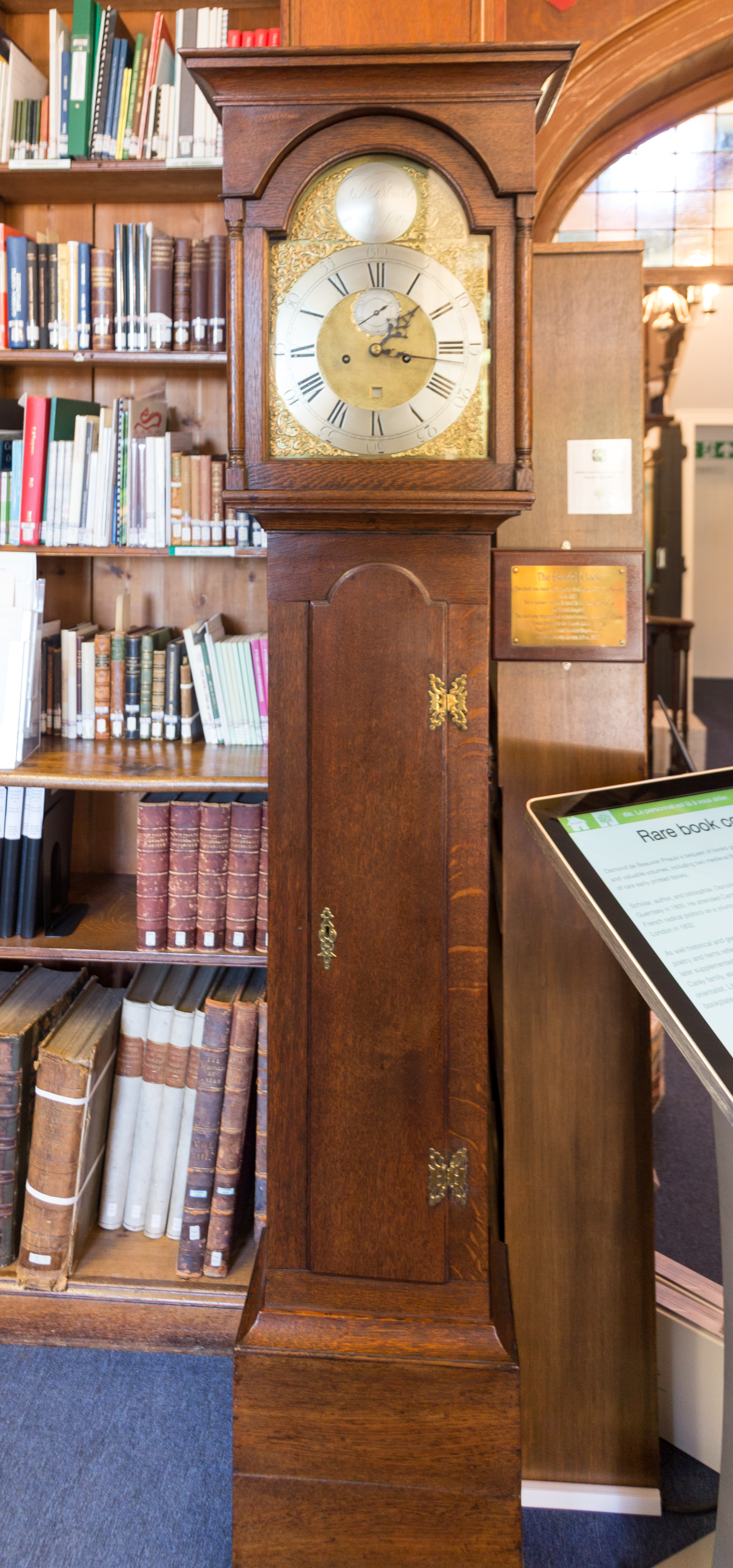
The Blondel Clock

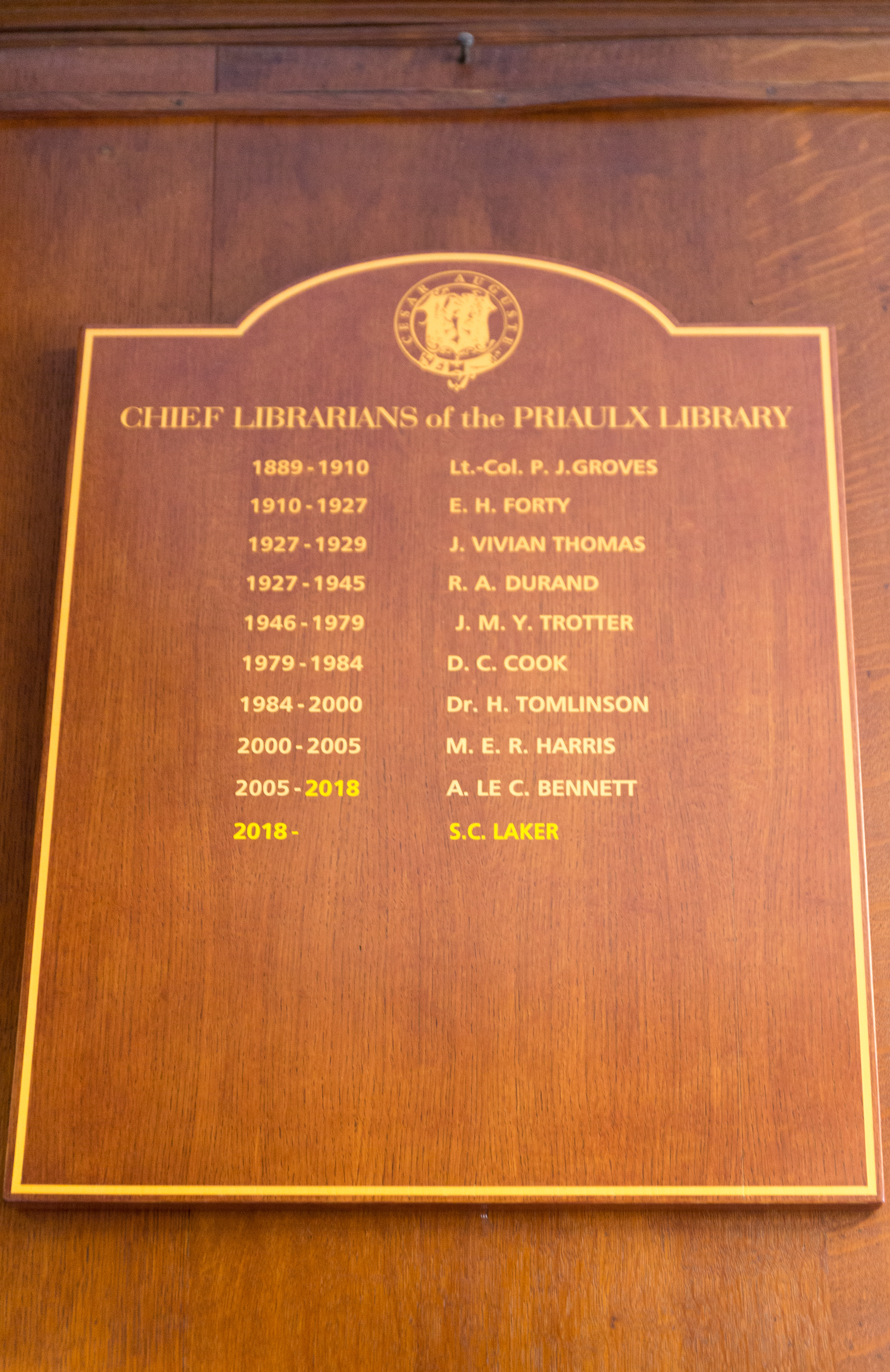
List of the chief librarians.

The library building, Candie House, and its initial collection of books were donated to the island by Osmond de Beauvoir Priaulx in 1889. The initial collection included references on European, Classical and Oriental literature, military history and local genealogy. The building was subsequently extended and the collection enlarged with material covering all aspects of Guernsey history.

== Today ==
The library's collection of local history and genealogy records makes it a primary resource for researchers in these areas. It also hosts exhibitions and lectures.
