= Culture of Guernsey =

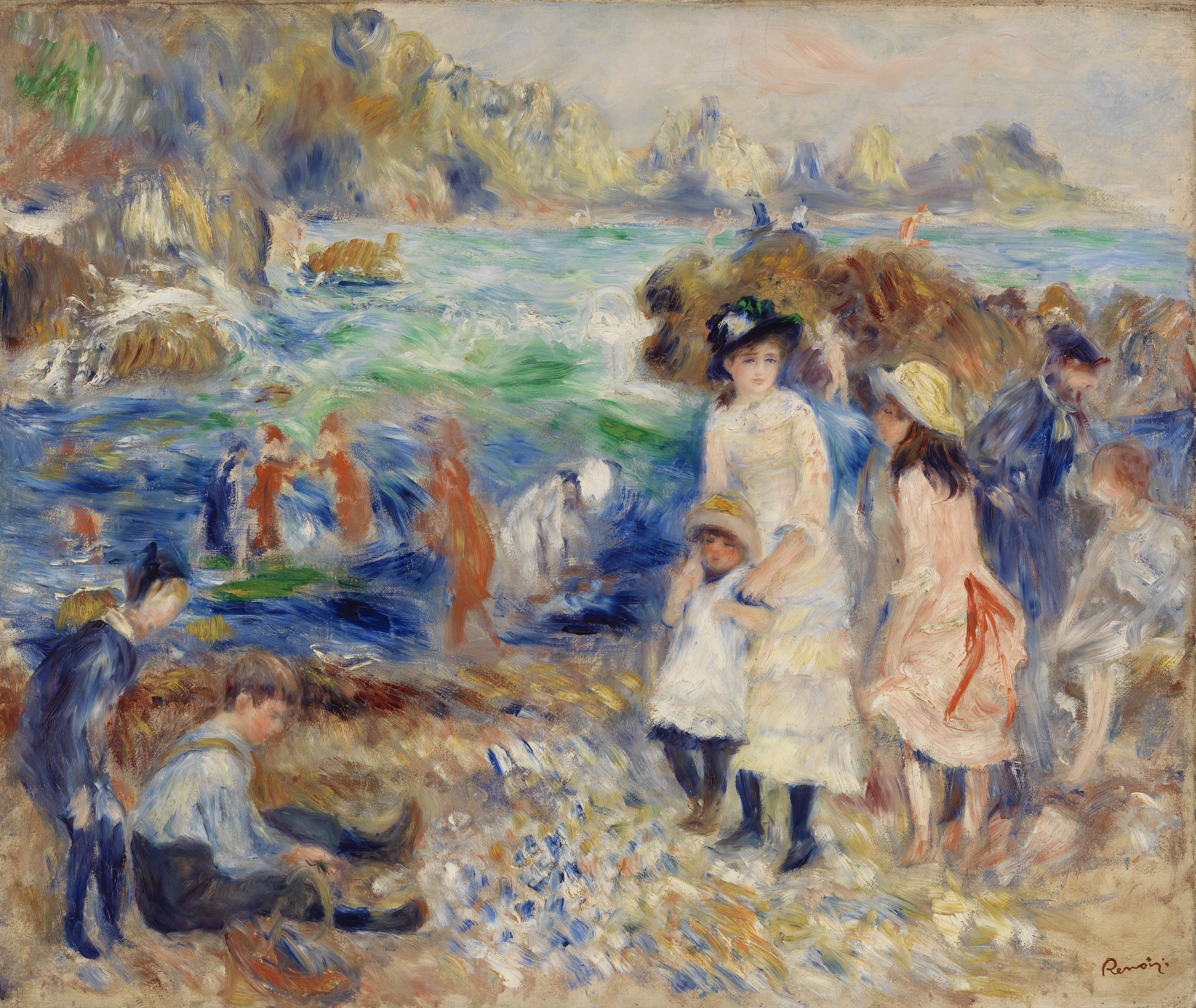
Children on the Beach of Guernsey, 1883, by Pierre-Auguste Renoir

The culture of Guernsey in the Bailiwick of Guernsey is a culture which has been shaped by its indigenous Norman language and traditions as well as French (especially Norman) and British (especially English) cultural influences. Cultural trends from immigrant communities such as the Portuguese and Latvian have also been added.

== Symbols ==
The national animals of the island of Guernsey are the donkey and the Guernsey cow. The traditional explanation for the donkey (âne in French and Guernésiais) is the steepness of St Peter Port streets that necessitated beasts of burden for transport (in contrast to the flat terrain of the rival capital of Saint Helier in Jersey), although it is also used in reference to Guernsey inhabitants' stubbornness who boast that they are "stubborn as a mule, with a kick like a horse!"

The Guernsey cow is a more internationally famous icon of the island. As well as being prized for its rich creamy milk, which is claimed by some to hold health benefits over milk from other breeds, Guernsey cattle are increasingly being raised for their beef, which has a distinctive flavour and rich yellow fat. Although the number of individual islanders raising these cattle for private supply has diminished significantly since the 1960s, Guernsey steers can still be occasionally seen grazing on L'Ancresse common.

There is also a breed of goat known as the Golden Guernsey, which is distinguished by its golden-coloured coat. At the end of World War II, the Golden Guernsey was almost extinct, due to interbreeding with other varieties on the island. The resurrection of this breed is largely credited to the work of a single woman, Miss Miriam Milbourne. Although no longer considered in a 'critical' status, the breed remains on the "Watch List" of the Rare Breeds Survival Trust.

Guernsey people are traditionally nicknamed donkeys or ânes, especially by Jersey people (who in turn are nicknamed crapauds - toads). Inhabitants of each of the parishes of Guernsey also have traditional nicknames, although these have generally dropped out of use among the English-speaking population.

The so-called Guernsey lily, Nerine sarniensis (Sarnia is the traditional name of the island of Guernsey in Latin), is also used as a symbol of the island.

"Sarnia Cherie" is used as the anthem of Guernsey when a distinguishing anthem is required.

Liberation Day on 9 May is the occasion of large celebrations every year to mark the end of the German occupation in 1945.

== Gastronomy ==
Dishes traditional in Guernsey cuisine are the Guernsey gâche, a rich fruit bread; gâche mêlaïe, apple pudding; "bean jar", a type of cassoulet of pork and beans; and conger soup.

A local delicacy is the ormer (Haliotis tuberculata), à ce variety of abalone harvested from the beach at low spring tides. Other seafood such as spider crabs, mussels, and lobster are popular.

== Language ==
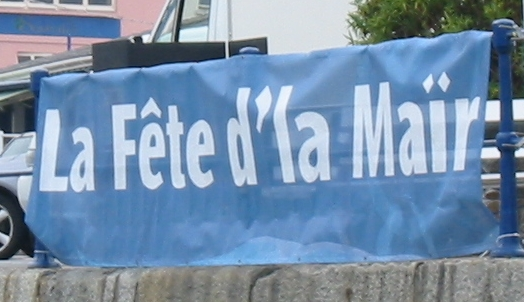
Festival of the Sea (in Guernésiais)

English is the only language spoken by a majority of the population, while Guernésiais, the Norman language of the island, is currently spoken fluently by 2% of the population (according to 2001 census). However, 14% of the population claim some understanding of the language and it is taught in a few Island schools. Until the early twentieth century French was the only official language. Family and place names reflect this linguistic heritage such as the word "hougue" from the Norse meaning hill and "vraic" being a type of seaweed. The island's loss of the language reflects a significant anglicisation of its culture and mindset, partly brought on by a large number of tax exiles from England. Portuguese is taught in a few schools and is spoken by around 2% of the population.

== Literature ==
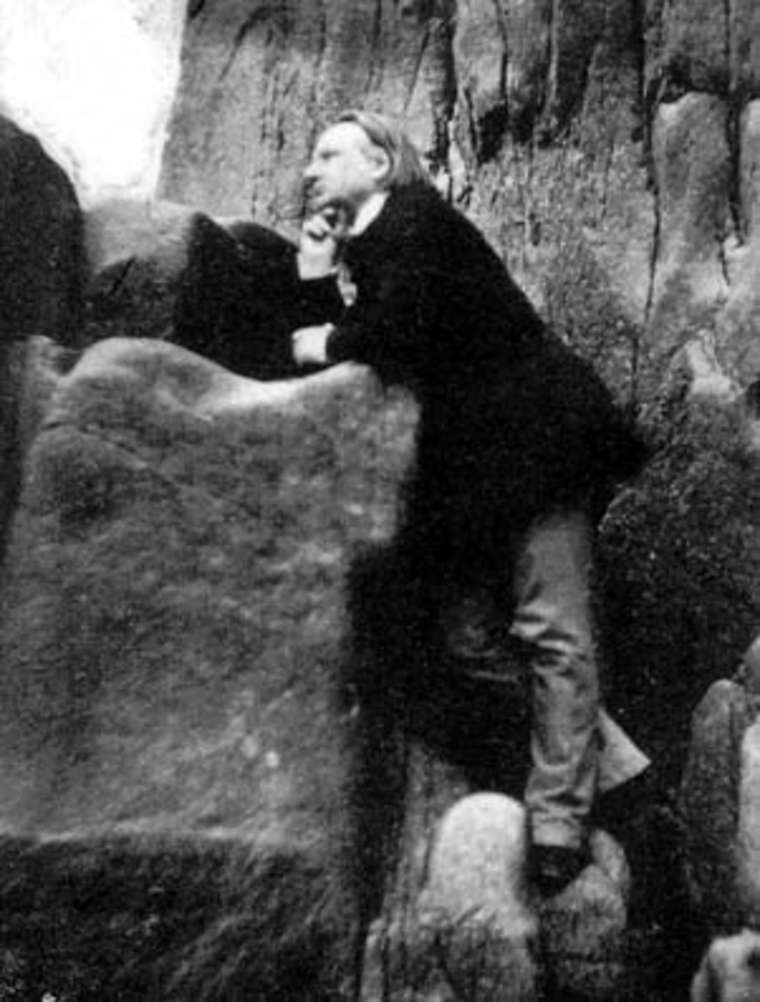
Victor Hugo was in exile in Jersey, and latterly Guernsey.

Victor Hugo wrote some of his best-known works while in exile in Guernsey, including Les Misérables. His home in St Peter Port, Hauteville House, is now a museum administered by the city of Paris. In 1866, he published a novel set in the island, Travailleurs de la Mer (Toilers of the Sea), which he dedicated to the island of Guernsey.

The best-known novel by a Guernseyman is The Book of Ebenezer Le Page, by GB Edwards which, in addition to being a critically acclaimed work of literature, contained insights into life in Guernsey during the twentieth century.

George Métivier, often considered the island's national poet, wrote in Guernésiais. Other important Guernésiais writers are Denys Corbet, Tam Lenfestey, T. H. Mahy and Marjorie Ozanne.

Elizabeth Goudge, the Twentieth century British writer was the daughter of a Guernsey woman. Goudge drew on some of her mother's stories of family and her childhood on the island in her first novel Island Magic (1934), and later Green Dolphin Country (1944: USA Green Dolphin Street, also an MGM Oscar winning movie), and Make-Believe (1949), a loose sequel of short stories about the du Frocq family of Island Magic.

== Local measurements ==
- Land area
  - In Guernsey is a vergée (Guernésiais: vergie) is 17,640 square feet (1,639 m^{2}). It is 40 (square) Guernsey perches.
  - A Guernsey perch (also spelt perque) is 21 feet by 21 feet.
- Money
  - Between 1830 and 1956, Guernsey's four coin denominations, 1, 2, 4 and 8 doubles. The double was worth 1/80 of a French franc. 8 double was a Guernsey penny.
  - 12 Guernsey Pennies made a Guernsey shilling (not the same as an English shilling)
  - 20 Guernsey Shillings made a Guernsey Pound (not the same as an English pound)
  - In 1848, an ordinance was passed that the pound sterling should be legal tender at a value of Guernsey £1 1s 3d (2040 doubles).
  - In 1870, British coins were made legal tender, with the British shilling circulating at 12½ Guernsey pence.
  - In 1914, new banknotes appeared, some of which carried denominations in Guernsey shillings and francs.
  - After 1921 it was decided to adopt 8 doubles=1 penny, 1 penny being the same as an English penny.
- Weights
  - The Guernsey Pound was 2 ounces heavier than an English Pound

== Media ==
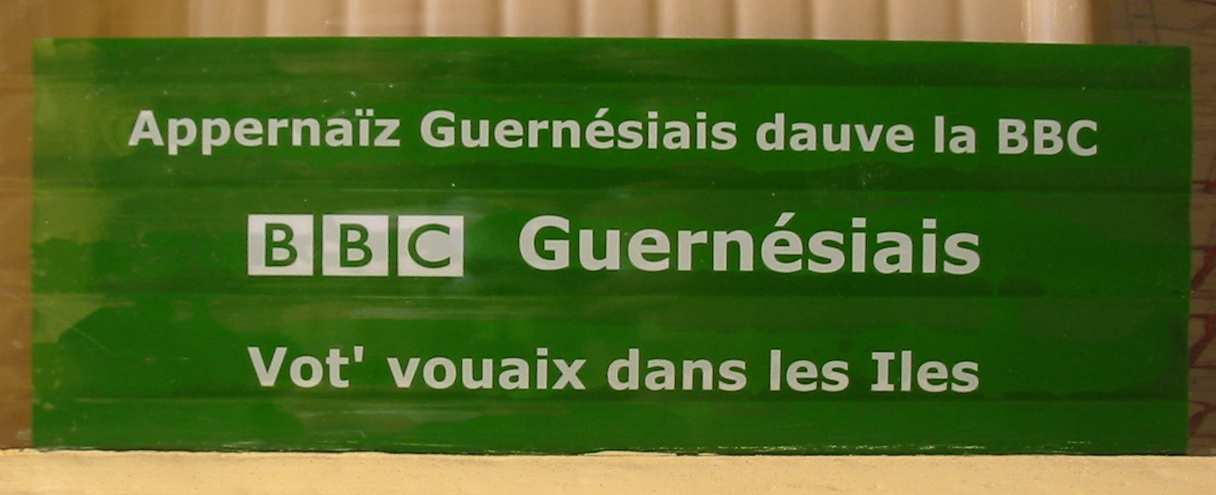
Guernésiais BBC sticker

Two radio stations, BBC Guernsey and Island FM, serve Guernsey.

Guernsey together with the other Channel Islands has ITV Channel Television, an ITV regional franchise. A lot of the content of ITV Channel TV is from/based on Jersey. It produces a daily news programme ITV News Channel TV. From the point of view of television coverage, the BBC has always treated the islands as an extension of their South West England region, relaying programmes from Plymouth to the islands. (The BBC does now broadcast an opt-out of the regional news bulletin, Spotlight, for the Channel Islands.) This posed a problem to the Independent Television Authority as, constitutionally, the Television Act 1954 did not apply to the islands, so the ITA's ability to operate there had to be permitted by means of extending the Act to the islands by means of an Order in Council. Due to a technicality that prevented the Channel Islands from receiving colour television, Channel could only broadcast in black and white until 1976. Due to the proximity to France, French television is fairly easily received as well.

The Guernsey Press and Star is the daily newspaper.

== Music ==
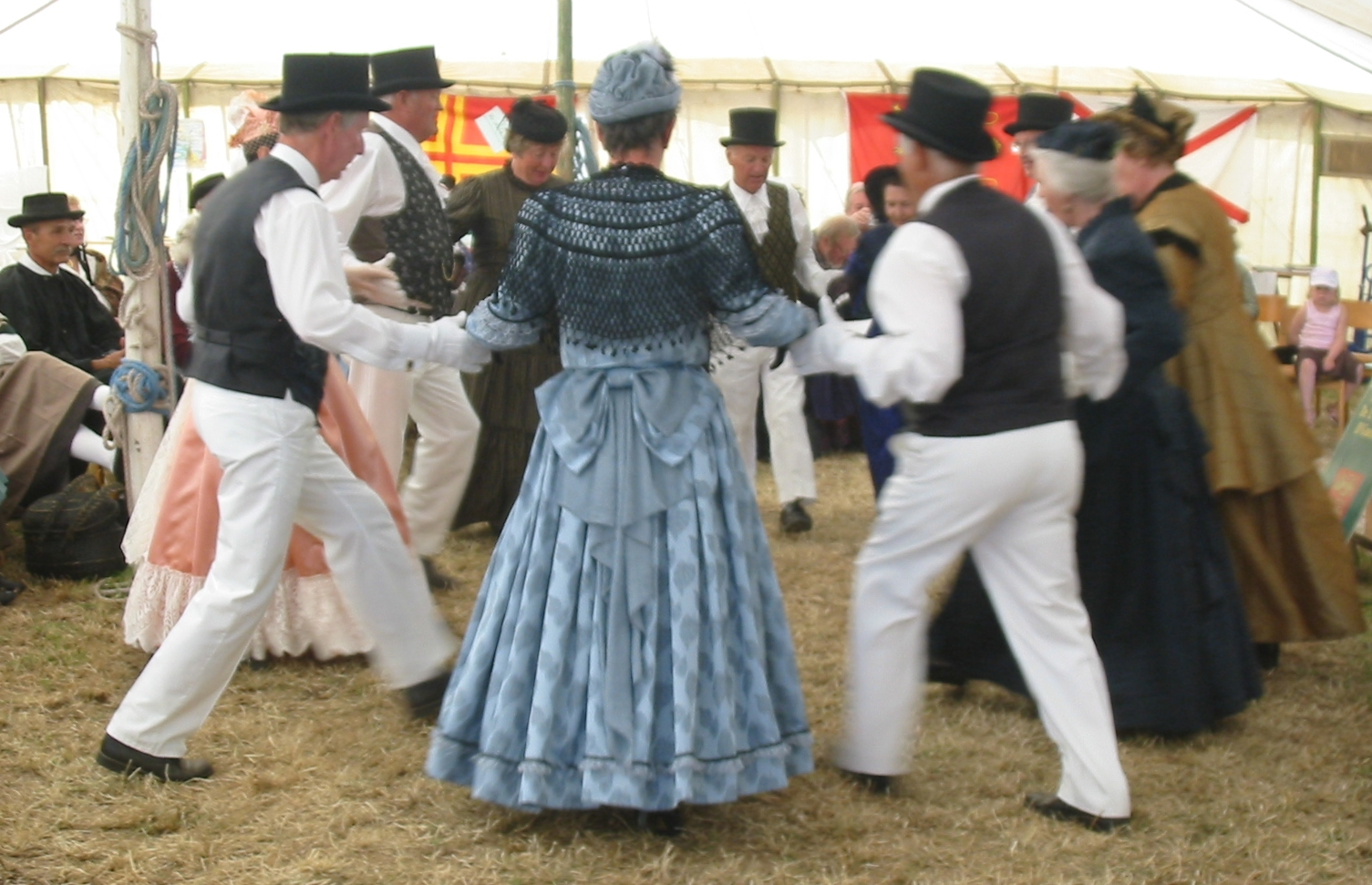
Guernsey folk dance

The Reformation brought Calvinism to the islands and the later strong influence of Methodism suppressed dancing and secular music. A number of traditional songs and dances have been recorded, and some gentrified dances were collected in the 19th century in Guernsey. "La Bébée" ("the Baby Polka" or "Klatschtanz") is a 19th-century novelty dance which also remains popular with costumed folklore groups in various parts of Europe. Some traditional folk songs such as Jean, Gros Jean and J'ai perdu ma faumme have survived. Groups such as La Guaine du Vouêt and Les Dànsaeurs dé L'Assembllaïe D'Guernésiais perform at events such as Lé Viaer Marchi.

According to Edith Carey (1903), the traditional chifournie had disappeared from Guernsey by the mid-nineteenth century.

John Ireland settled for a time in Guernsey.

Recently, Guernsey has hosted a live music event called Guernsey Live. This music festival has been one of the biggest events in the Channel Islands and sister festival of Jersey Live.

The Music Service in Guernsey is renowned for its high quality of teaching and the effects of this can be seen in the standard of performance of many young people in the island.

== Sport ==
Guernsey participates in its own right in the Commonwealth Games.

Guernsey participates in the Island Games, which it hosted in 2003 and 2023. In sporting events in which Guernsey does not have international representation, when the British Home Nations are competing separately, islanders that do have high athletic skill may choose to compete for any of the Home Nations - there are, however, restrictions on subsequent transfers to represent another Home Nation. The football player Matt Le Tissier for example, tried out for the Scotland national football team but ended up playing for England.

The island's traditional colour (e.g. for sporting events) is green. The Corbet Football Field donated by Jurat Wilfred Corbet OBE in 1932 has fostered the sport greatly over the years. The annual Muratti match, inaugurated in 1905, between the Channel Islands gives an airing to the traditional rivalry between the Guernsey national football team and Jersey. Similarly the Siam Cup has been fought over by Rugby teams since 1920.

Both Guernsey F.C. and Guernsey RFC compete in England leagues. Women's rugby and football also compete in English leagues.

The Guernsey Cricket Board is an affiliate member by the International Cricket Council (ICC). and the Guernsey cricket team competes in world cricket.

== Gallery ==
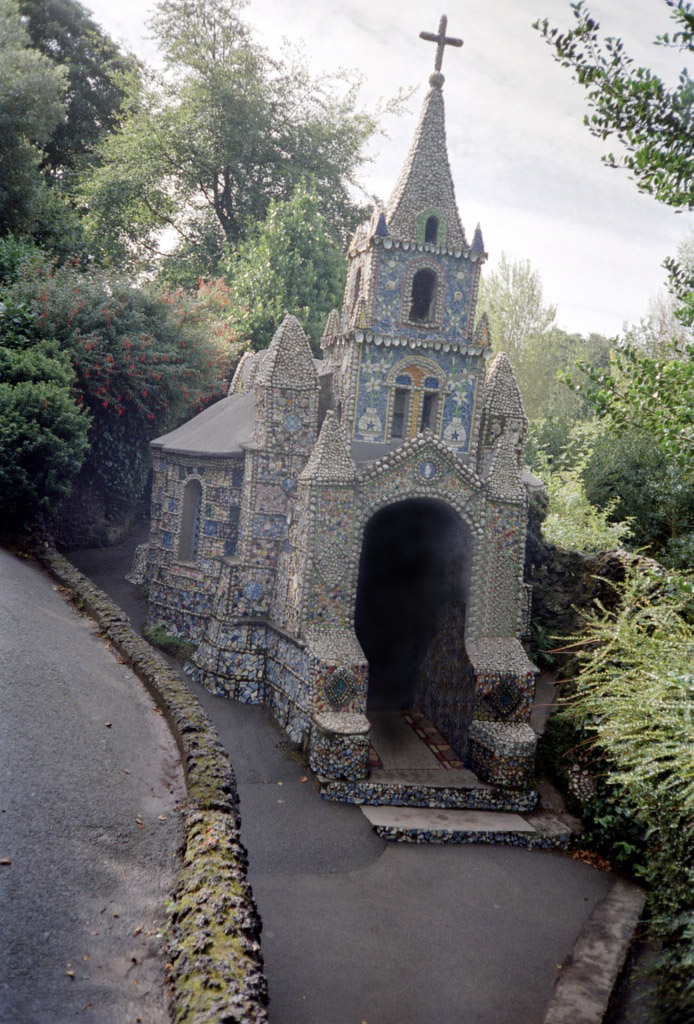
Little Chapel, Les Vauxbelets, Guernsey

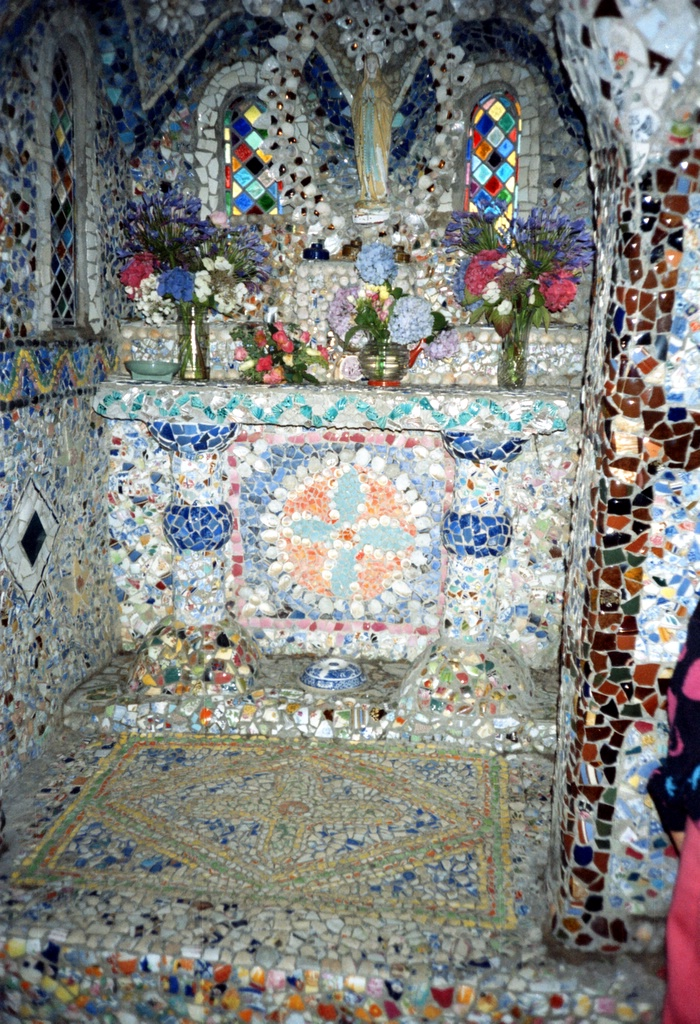
Little chapel interior

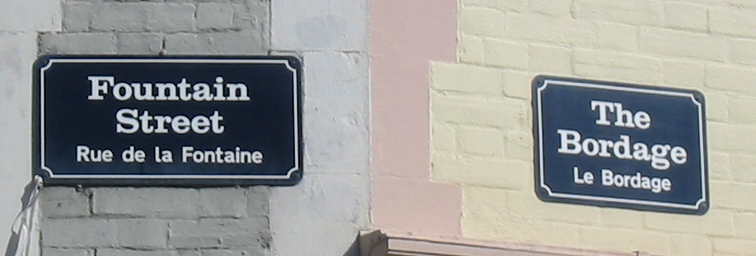
Fountain Bordage signs St Peter Port Guernsey

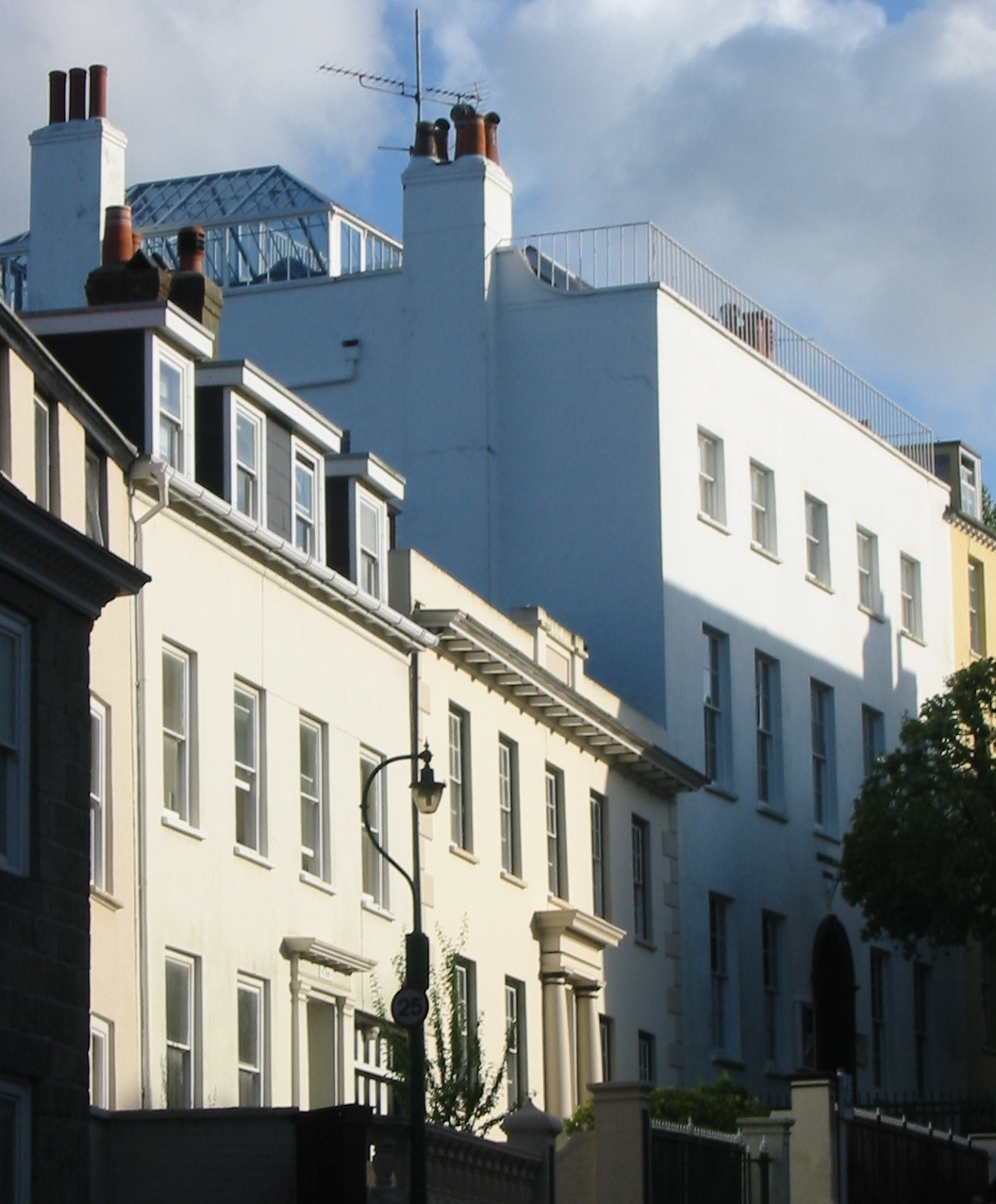
Hauteville-House
