= Mallon =

Mallon is a surname. An Irish variant is "Ó Mealláin". The name may refer to any of these well-known people:

== People ==
- Alexis Mallon (1875–1934), also Père Mallon, French Jesuit priest and archaeologist
- Alice Mallon (1900–1992), Australian soprano
- Andy Mallon (born 1983), Irish Gaelic football player
- Bill Mallon (born 1952), American historian
- Feardorcha Ó Mealláin, Irish poet
- Florencia Mallon (born 1951), Chilean historian
- George B. Mallon (1865–1928), American journalist
- George H. Mallon (1877–1934), American army captain and Medal of Honor recipient
- Gui Mallon (born 1953), Brazilian composer
- Henry Neil Mallon (1895–1983), American businessman
- Henry Ó Mealláin (1579–1642), Irish Franciscan friar
- James Joseph Mallon (1874–1961), British political activist
- Jean Mallon (1904–1982), French palaeographer
- Jim Mallon (born James Joseph Mallon, 1956), American television producer
- Mary Mallon (1869–1938), American typhoid carrier
- Mary Mallon (1957–2006), professor of human resource management
- Meg Mallon (born 1963), American golfer
- Nichola Mallon (born 1979), Irish politician
- Ray Mallon (born 1955), British politician
- Ryan Mallon (born 1983), British football player
- Seamus Mallon (1936–2020), Irish politician
- Seamus Mallon (rugby union) (born 1980), Irish rugby union player
- Tarlach Ó Mealláin, Irish writer
- Thomas Mallon (born 1951), American writer

== Fictional Characters ==
- Marian Mallon, main antagonist in Dead Rising 2: Case West and secondary antagonist in Dead Rising 3
- Michelle Mallon, main character in Derry Girls

== Other uses ==
- Mallon Building, Indiana
- Hail Mary Mallon, an American hip-hop group consisting of Aesop Rock, Rob Sonic, and DJ Big Wiz.
