= Thomas Alfred Grut =

Thomas Alfred Grut (1852–1933) was a Guernsey photographer and author. He published Des lures guernesiaises in 1927, a collection of newspaper columns in Guernésiais. He also translated some of the Jèrriais stories of Philippe Le Sueur Mourant into Guernésiais.

Grut was a notable Guernsey photographer in his day. He established his first studio at 2 Victoria Crescent, Victoria Road in St Peter Port in 1879 called the "Central Studio" and later moved his studio to 5 (Le) Pollet Street in St. Peter Port in 1894. During Grut's career, he captured the portraits of many citizens and notable persons both of the Channel Islands and other countries.
