= Marjorie Ozanne =

Guernésiais author and poet

Marjorie Edith Ozanne (1897–1973) wrote stories and poetry in Guernésiais, published in the Guernsey Evening Press between 1949 and 1965. Some earlier pieces can be found in La Gazette de Guernesey in the 1920s. She is remembered for her Guernsey-French stories and poems, and for starting the first bird hospital in the world, which she continued to run during the German occupation of the Channel Islands.

== Biography ==
Ozanne was born in 1897, the daughter of a verger at Vale Church. When he was ill she used to take on his responsibilities, including grave digging, and it was in the churchyard that she developed her lifelong love of birds. After World War I she trained as a teacher in England, returning after her parents' death to teach in Guernsey.

Her world-famous bird hospital was first established at Les Cordeliers in the Grange, where she lived with her companion Nell Littlefield. To pay for the birds' feed she used to make shell animals and sell them at the market. During the German occupation of the Channel Islands she carried on with the bird hospital and a German officer often helped with food. After the Occupation Marjorie Ozanne gave up teaching and moved to Bon Air, Les Adams, L'Eree, where she continued to run the bird hospital until her death in 1973. "The hospital became internationally known after the Occupation ended and it was perhaps the first of its kind in the world." Her work at the bird hospital was shown on British television.

Marjorie Ozanne had spoken Guernsey-French since her childhood and for many years wrote poems, sketches and humorous plays. Some of these were performed at the Eiseddford (Guernsey) and others published in the Guernsey Evening Press. She used the spoken bas pas lexical variation, but her spellings may seem unfamiliar or idiosyncratic, as she wrote prior to the publication of the Dictiounnaire Angllais–Guernesiais (English–Guernesiais Dictionary) in 1967. "Miss Ozanne is the most important Guernsey French writer of the last century and on a par with the two principle Guernsey-French writers, George Métiviere and Denys Corbet".

Kenneth William Hill, of Guernsey, translated her works and put the Guernsey-French alongside the English translations. He commented that it was important to retain the original language as, in the 20th Century onwards, the puns and double entendres that she used do not work.

Ozanne died at the Town Hall hospital, where she had been a patient for some time. She had no close relations so she was buried in an unmarked grave at the Vale church next to her parents and sister. Her grave was discovered in 1988 and La Société Guernesiaise organised a headstone. An unveiling ceremony in 1989 was held which was attended by friends, former students, the GSPCA, RSPB and various sections of La Société Guernesiaise.
