= George Mallon =

George Mallon may refer to:

- George B. Mallon (1865–1928), American journalist
- George H. Mallon (1877–1934), U.S. Army officer and Medal of Honor recipient
