= Guernésiais =

Variety of Norman spoken in Guernsey

- Dgèrnésiais, Guernsey French
- guernésiais, dgèrnésiais
- Native to: Guernsey
- Native speakers: 200 (2014)https://www.ethnologue.com/language/nrf/
- Language family: Indo-European: Italic; Latino-Faliscan; Latinic; Romance; Italo-Western; Western; Gallo-Romance; Oïl; Norman; Guernésiais
- Early forms: Old Latin: Vulgar Latin; Proto-Romance; Old Gallo-Romance; Old French; Old Norman
- Writing system: Latin (French orthography)

Official status
- Official language in: Guernsey

Language codes
- ISO 639-3: nrf
- Glottolog: dger1238
- ELP: Guernésiais
- Linguasphere: 51-AAA-hc
- IETF: nrf-GG

A page from Guernsey Proverbs and Sayings (1905) with text in Guernésiais and English. Text in brackets are French glosses.

Guernésiais (French pronunciation: [ɡɛʁnezjɛ]), also known as Guerneseyese, Dgèrnésiais, Guernsey French, and Guernsey Norman French, is the variety of the Norman language spoken in Guernsey. It is sometimes known on the island simply as "patois". As one of the langues d'oïl, it has its roots in Latin, but has had strong influence from both Old Norse and English at different points in its history.

There is mutual intelligibility (with some difficulty) with Jèrriais speakers from Jersey and Continental Norman speakers from Normandy. Guernésiais most closely resembles the Norman dialect of Cotentinais spoken in La Hague in the Cotentin Peninsula of France.

Guernésiais has been influenced less by Standard French than Jèrriais, but conversely more so by English. New words have been imported for modern phenomena: e.g. le bike and le gas-cooker.

There is a rich tradition of poetry in the Guernsey language. Guernsey songs were inspired by the sea, by colourful figures of speech, by traditional folk-lore, as well as by the natural environment of the island. The island's greatest poet was George Métivier (1790–1881), a contemporary of Victor Hugo, who influenced and inspired local poets to print and publish their traditional poetry. Métivier blended local place-names, bird and animal names, traditional sayings and orally transmitted fragments of medieval poetry to create his Rimes Guernesiaises (1831). Denys Corbet (1826–1910) was considered the "Last Poet" of Guernsey French and published many poems in his day in his native tongue, both in the island newspaper and privately.

The most recent dictionary of Guernésiais, Dictiounnaire Angllais–guernesiais by Marie de Garis, was published in 1967 and revised in 1982.

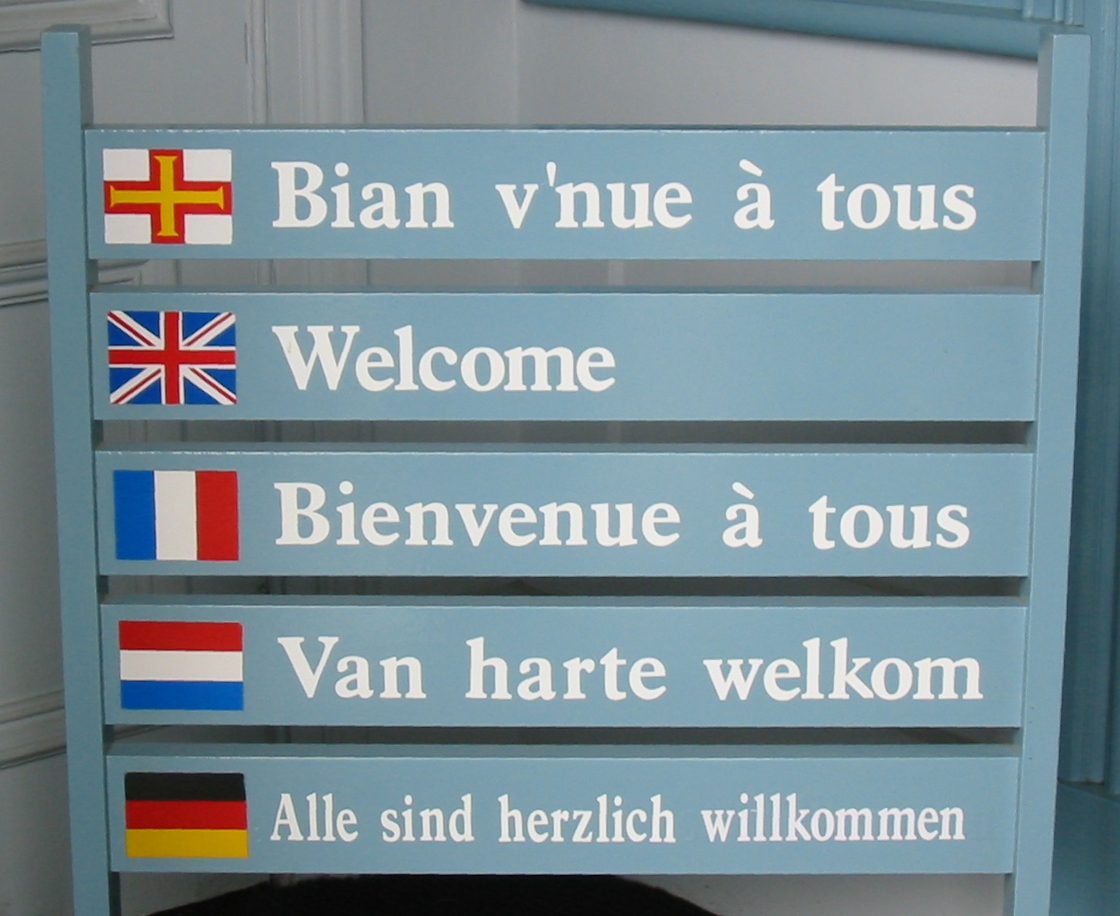
Guernésiais tops this list of welcome messages at Guernsey's tourism office in Saint Peter Port.

== History ==
Guernsey was a part of Normandy until the latter was conquered by French kings; a form of the Norman language developed in the Channel Islands and survived for hundreds of years. Guernésiais is considered to be one of the langues d'oïl, which includes French and its closest relatives. Later, after the separation of Guernsey and Normandy, French Protestant refugees escaped to the island from fear of persecution in mainland France; they quickly gained influence and positions of power in education, religion, and government. This accounts for the long tradition of a diglossic relationship between French and Guernesiais whereby French had prestige while Guernesiais did not.

The English language began to spread in Guernsey in the era of the Napoleonic Wars, during which there was a significant outposting of English soldiers on the island as well as an increase of English tourism and immigration. With the German occupation of Guernsey from 1940 to 1945, Guernesiais suffered more of a decline because children were evacuated off the island, which resulted in Guernesiais not being transmitted to much of their generation. It is from this point onwards that Guernesiais continued to decline in use and so, according to the 2001 census conducted in Guernsey, only 2.2% of the population at the time reported being fluent in Guernesiais.

- Guernsey poet George Métivier (1790–1881) – nicknamed the Guernsey Burns, was the first to produce a dictionary of the Norman language in the Channel Islands, the Dictionnaire Franco-Normand (1870). This established the first standard orthography – later modified and modernised. Among his poetical works are Rimes Guernesiaises published in 1831.
- Prince Louis Lucien Bonaparte published the Gospel of Matthew by George Métivier in Dgèrnésiais in London in 1863 as part of his philological research.
- Like Métivier, Tam Lenfestey (1818–1885) published poetry in Guernsey newspapers and in book form.
- Denys Corbet (1826–1909) described himself as the Draïn Rimeux (last poet), but literary production continued. Corbet is best known for his poems, especially the epic L'Touar de Guernesy, a picaresque tour of the parishes of Guernsey. As editor of the French-language newspaper Le Bailliage, he also wrote feuilletons in Dgèrnésiais under the pen name Badlagoule ("chatterbox"). In 2009 the island held a special exhibition in the Forest Parish on Corbet and his work acknowledging the centenary of his death and unveiling a contemporary portrait painting of the artist by Christian Corbet a cousin to Denys Corbet.
- Thomas Martin (1839–1921) translated into Guernésiais the Bible, the plays of William Shakespeare, twelve plays by Pierre Corneille, three plays by Thomas Corneille, twenty seven plays by Molière, twenty plays by Voltaire and The Spanish Student by Henry Wadsworth Longfellow.
- Thomas Henry Mahy (1862 – 21 April 1936) wrote Dires et Pensées du Courtil Poussin, a regular column in La Gazette Officielle de Guernesey, from 1916. A collection was published in booklet form in 1922. He was still publishing occasional pieces of poetry and prose by the start of the 1930s.
- Thomas Alfred Grut (1852–1933) published Des lures guernesiaises in 1927, once again a collection of newspaper columns. He also translated some of the Jèrriais stories of Philippe Le Sueur Mourant into Dgèrnésiais.
- Marjorie Ozanne (1897–1973) wrote stories, published in the Guernsey Evening Press between 1949 and 1965. Some earlier pieces can be found in La Gazette de Guernesey in the 1920s.
- Ken Hill translated many of Marjorie Ozanne's short stories and poems into English with the Guernsey accent of the early 20th century. The work was published by the Guernsey society.
- Métivier's dictionary was superseded by Marie de Garis' (1910–2010) Dictiounnaire Angllais-Guernésiais; first edition published in 1967, supplements 1969 and 1973, third edition 1982.
- When the Channel Islands were invaded by Germany in World War II, Dgèrnésiais experienced a minor revival. Many Guernsey people did not always wish the occupying forces to understand what they were saying, especially as some of the soldiers had knowledge of English.
- Victor Hugo includes the odd word of Dgèrnésiais in some of his Channel Island novels. Hugo's novel Toilers of the Sea (French: Les Travailleurs de la mer), is credited with introducing the Guernesiais word for octopus, pieuvre, into the French language (standard French for octopus is poulpe).
- A collection of short stories P'tites Lures Guernésiaises (in Guernésiais with parallel English translation) by various writers was published in 2006.

== Current status ==
The 2001 census showed that 1327 (1262 Guernsey-born) or 2% of the population speak the language fluently while 3% fully understand the language. However most of these, 70% or 934 of the 1327 fluent speakers, are over 64 years old. Among the young only 0.1% or one in a thousand are fluent speakers. However, 14% of the population claim some understanding of the language.

- L'Assembllaïe d'Guernesiais, an association for speakers of the language founded in 1957, has published a periodical. Les Ravigoteurs, another association, has published a storybook and cassette for children.
- Forest School hosts an annual speaking contest of the island's primary school children (Year 6).
- The annual Eisteddfod provides an opportunity for performances in the language, and radio and newspaper outlets furnish regular media output.
- There is some teaching of the language in voluntary classes in schools in Guernsey.
- Evening classes are available, as of 2013.
- Lunchtime classes are offered at the Guernsey Museum, as of 2013.
- Along with Jèrriais, Irish, Scottish Gaelic, Welsh, Manx and Scots (in Scotland as well as the Ulster Scots dialects), Guernésiais is recognised as a regional language by the British and Irish governments within the framework of the British–Irish Council.
- BBC Radio Guernsey and the Guernsey Press both feature occasional lessons.
- A Guernésiais language development officer was appointed (with effect from January 2008).

There is little broadcasting in the language, with ITV Channel Television more or less ignoring the language, and only the occasional short feature on BBC Radio Guernsey, usually for learners. In 2021 BBC Radio Guernsey broadcast a 10 minute news bulletin once a week in Guernésiais.

In 2022 a documentary on the future of Guernsey French was produced for BBC radio.

The creation of a Guernsey Language Commission was announced on 7 February 2013 as an initiative by government to preserve the linguistic culture. The Commission has operated since Liberation Day, 9 May 2013.

== Revitalization ==
While Guernesiais does not have status as an official language of the island, revitalization efforts are still being undertaken on a small scale. One group, Le Coumité d'la Culture Guernesiaise, organizes activities and events that celebrate Guernesiais. The Eisteddfod cultural festival is a public event where attendees can enjoy plays, poems, and music performed in Guernesiais. There is also a local choir on Guernsey called La Guaine du Vouest who conduct musical performances in Guernesiais to further promote the language and the cultural and linguistic heritage of Guernsey.

In 2007, efforts to revitalize Guernesiais were undertaken at an official level, when the government appointed a Language Support Officer (LSO), albeit with ambiguous direction. The position was only held until 2011; after that, there was no replacement and instead a Language Commission was formed in order to support efforts to revitalize Guernesiais by smaller groups.

== Bible translations ==
- George Métivier translated the Gospel of Matthew into Guernésiais, which was published in London in 1863.
- Thomas Martin translated the whole Bible into Guernésiais, although this has never been published.

== Phonology ==
Guernésiais consonants
		Labial	Alveolar	Post- alveolar	Palatal	Velar/ glottal
Nasal		m	n		ɲ	
Plosive/ affricate	voiceless	p	t	tʃ	(kʲ)	k
Plosive/ affricate	voiced	b	d	dʒ	(ɡʲ)	ɡ
Fricative	voiceless	f	s	ʃ		h
Fricative	voiced	v	z	ʒ		
Rhotic			r			
Approximant	plain		l		j	
Approximant	labial				ɥ	w

- /r/ may also be heard as a tap sound [ɾ].
- /tʃ, dʒ/ are heard by different dialects as well as older speakers as palatalized plosives [kʲ, ɡʲ].

Guernésiais oral vowels
	Front		Back
	unrounded	rounded	Back
Close	i iː	y yː	u uː
Close-mid	e eː	ø øː	o oː
Open-mid	ɛ ɛː	œ œː	ɔ ɔː
Open	a aː		ɑ ɑː

Nasal vowels
	Front		Back
	unrounded	rounded	Back
Close-mid	ẽ ẽː		õ õː
Open-mid	ɛ̃ ɛ̃ː	œ̃ œ̃ː	ɔ̃ ɔ̃ː
Open	ã ãː		ɑ̃ ɑ̃ː

- Vowel sounds /a, ã/; /aː, ãː/ may also be heard as near open [æ, æ̃]; [æː, æ̃ː].

Metathesis of /r/ is common in Guernésiais, by comparison with Sercquiais and Jèrriais.

Guernésiais	Sercquiais	Jèrriais	French	English
kérouaïe	krwee	crouaix	croix	cross
méquerdi	mekrëdi	Mêcrédi	mercredi	Wednesday

Other examples are pourmenade (promenade), persentaïr (present), terpid (tripod).

== Verbs ==
aver, have (auxiliary verb)

	present	preterite	imperfect	future	conditional
1 sg.	j'ai	j'aëus	j'avais	j'érai	j'érais
2 sg.	t'as	t'aëus	t'avais	t'éras	t'érais
3 sg. (m)	il a	il aëut	il avait	il éra	il érait
3 sg. (f)	all' a	all' aeut	all' avait	all' éra	all' érait
1 pl.	j'avaöns	j'eûnmes	j'avaëmes	j'éraöns	j'éraëmes
2 pl.	vous avaïz	vous aeutes	vous avaites	vous éraïz	vous éraites
3 pl.	il' aönt	il' aëurent	il' avaient	il' éraönt	il' éraient

oimaïr, to love (regular conjugation)

	present	preterite	imperfect	future	conditional
1 sg.	j'oime	j'oimis	j'oimais	j'oim'rai	j' oim'rais
2 sg.	t'oimes	t'oimis	t'oimais	t'oim'ras	t'oim'rais
3 sg. (m)	il oime	il oimit	il oimait	il oim'ra	il oim'rait
3 sg. (f)	all' oime	all' oimit	all' oimait	all' oim'ra	all' oim'rait
1 pl.	j'oimaöns	j'oimaëmes	j'oimaëmes	j'oim'rons	j' oim'raëmes
2 pl.	vous oimaïz	vous oimites	vous oimaites	vous oim'raïz	vous oim'raites
3 pl.	il' oiment	il' oimirent	il' oimaient	il' oim'raönt	il' oim'raient

== Examples ==
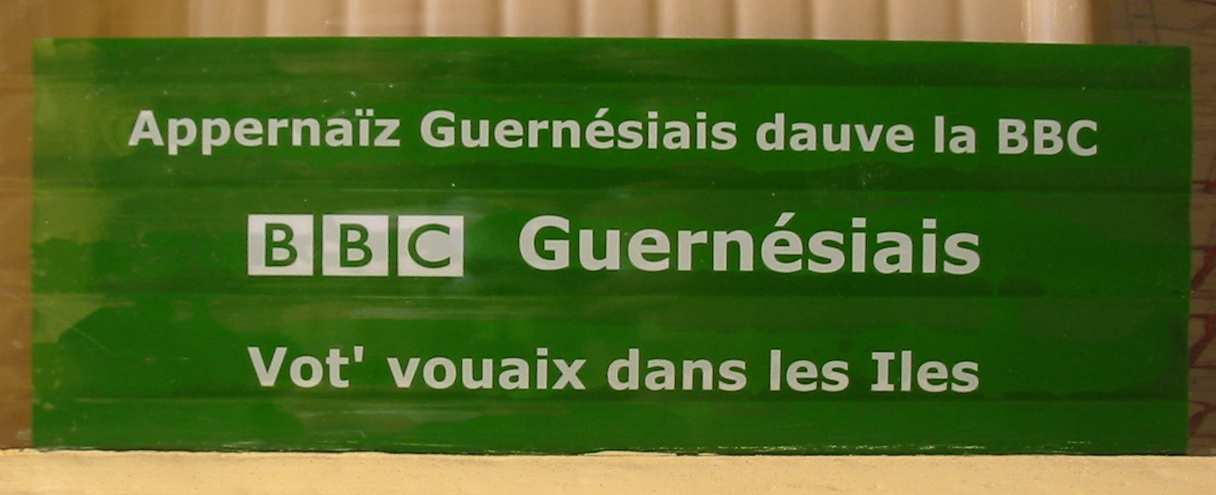
"Learn Guernésiais with the BBC BBC Guernsey Your voice in the Islands"

Guernésiais (Pronunciation)	English	French
Quaï temps qu’i fait?	What's the weather like?	Quel temps fait-il ?
I' fait caoud ogniet	It's warm today	Il fait chaud aujourd'hui
Tchi qu’est vote naom?	What's your name?	Formal: Comment vous appellez-vous ? Colloquial: Comment t'appelles-tu ? / Comment tu t'appelles ? Quel est votre nom ?
Coume tchi que l’affaire va? (kum chik la-fehr va)	How are you? Lit. How's business going?	Comment vont les affaires ?
Quaï haeure qu'il est?	What's the time?	Quelle heure est-il ?
À la perchoine (a la per-shoy-n)	See you next time	Au revoir À la prochaine
Mercie bian	Thank you very much	Merci beaucoup Coll: Merci bien
chén-chin	this	ceci
ch'techin	this one	celui-ci
Lâtchiz-mé	Leave me	Laissez-moi

== See also ==
- Auregnais dialect
- Literature in the other languages of Britain
- Sarnia Cherie
- Sercquiais

== Sources ==
- De Garis, Marie (5 November 1982). Dictiounnaire Angllais-Guernésiais. Phillimore & Co Ltd. ISBN 978-0-85033-462-3.
