= Ó Maoláin =

Ó Maoláin is a Gaelic-Irish surname usually anglicised as Mullin, Mullins, Mullan, Mullane, Mallon, Moylan, Mullen and Mellon, any of which may have an "'O'" prefix.

== Overview ==
There are at least three unrelated families of the name native to Ulster, with at least one further family, again unrelated, found in Munster in the County Cork-County Kerry region. The Ulster Ó Maoláin's were as follows:

- Ó Maoláin of Cianachta Glenn Geimin, a district of Tír Eoghain. Nowadays Mullin or Mullins.
- Ó Maoláin of Clones, County Monaghan. Nowadays anglicised as Mullin or Mellon.
- Ó Mealláin, anglicised as Mallon.

== See also ==
- Mac Maoláin
