= Fiona Edgar =

New Zealand professor of management

- Awards: Early Career Award for Distinction in Research

Academic background
- Education: University of Otago, University of Otago
- Thesis: Regulating for best practice in human resource management: The impact of the good employer obligation (2002)
- Doctoral advisor: Mary Mallon, Ian McAndrew, Alan J. Geare

Fiona Jacqueline Edgar (née McCullough) is a New Zealand management academic, and is a full professor at the University of Otago, specialising in human resource management and employment relations. As of 2024 she is head of the Department of Management at Otago.

== Academic career ==
Edgar was the first business school recipient of a Bright Futures Top Achiever Doctoral Scholarship. She completed a PhD titled Regulating for best practice in human resource management: The impact of the good employer obligation at the University of Otago in 2002. Her research was supervised by Mary Mallon, Ian McAndrew and Alan Geare. Edgar then joined the faculty of the Department of Management at the University of Otago, rising to associate professor in 2018 and full professor in 2023. As of 2024 she is head of Otago's Department of Management.

Egar's research focuses on the connection between human resource management and performance. She is concerned that employee views were considered in human resource management research. Edgar also researches how human resource management is linked to sustainability and organisational performance. In 2019, Edgar co-authored research that showed the cost to organisations of lost productivity due to employee alcohol use could be up to $1.65 billion annually.

Edgar is on the editorial boards of the journals Labour and Industry and The International Journal of Human Resource Management.

In 2008, Edgar was awarded an Early Career Researcher Award for Distinction in Research by the university. Edgar's 2009 paper with Alan Geare and Ian McAndrew, "Workplace Values and Beliefs: An Empirical Study of Ideology, High Commitment Management and Unionization", was chosen as one of the 50 best articles out of 15,000 published in the field in 2009.

== Selected works ==
- Alan Geare; Fiona Edgar; McAndrew, Ian (2009). "Workplace values and beliefs: an empirical study of ideology, high commitment management and unionisation". International Journal of Human Resource Management. 20 (5): 1146–1171. doi:10.1080/09585190902850331. Wikidata Q125797288.
- Fiona Edgar; Alan J. Geare (2005). "HRM practice and employee attitudes: different measures – different results". Personnel Review. 34 (5): 534–549. doi:10.1108/00483480510612503. Wikidata Q125797272.
- Alan Geare; Fiona Edgar; McAndrew, Ian (2006). "Employment relationships: ideology and HRM practice". International Journal of Human Resource Management. 17 (7): 1190–1208. doi:10.1080/09585190600756442. Wikidata Q125798388.
- Fiona Edgar; Alan Geare (2013). "Factors influencing university research performance". Studies in Higher Education. 38 (5): 774–792. doi:10.1080/03075079.2011.601811. Wikidata Q125797286.
- Jing A. Zhang; Fiona Edgar; Alan Geare; Conor O'Kane (2016). "The interactive effects of entrepreneurial orientation and capability-based HRM on firm performance: The mediating role of innovation ambidexterity". Industrial Marketing Management. 59: 131–143. doi:10.1016/j.indmarman.2016.02.018. Wikidata Q125797279.
- Nataliya Podgorodnichenko; Fiona Edgar; McAndrew, Ian (2020). "The role of HRM in developing sustainable organizations: Contemporary challenges and contradictions". Human Resource Management Review. 30 (3): 100685. doi:10.1016/j.hrmr.2019.04.001. Wikidata Q125797275.
- Vicky Browning; Fiona Edgar; Gray, Brendan James; Tony Garrett (2009). "Realising competitive advantage through HRM in New Zealand service industries". Service Industries Journal. 29 (6): 741–760. doi:10.1080/02642060902749237. Wikidata Q125797284.
- Fiona Edgar; Alan Geare (2009). "Inside the "black box" and "HRM"". International Journal of Manpower. 30 (3): 220–236. doi:10.1108/01437720910956736. Wikidata Q125797297.
