= Mary Mallon (academic) =

Professor of human resource management in New Zealand

- Born: 1957
- Died: March 19, 2006 (aged 48–49)

Academic background
- Education: Sheffield Hallam University
- Thesis: From managerial career to portfolio career: making sense of the transition (1988)

Academic work
- Institutions: Massey University, University of Otago
- Doctoral students: Fiona Edgar

Mary Mallon (1957 – 19 March 2006) was a British–New Zealand management academic, and was a full professor at Massey University, specialising in human resources, and different types of employment and career path.

== Academic career ==
Mallon completed a PhD titled From managerial career to portfolio career: making sense of the transition at Sheffield Hallam University in 1988. Her research was supervised by Cathy Cassell, Joanne Duberley and Phil Johnson. Mallon moved to New Zealand with her husband economics academic John Howells in 1998, and joined the faculty of the Business School at University of Otago as a senior lecturer. She joined the faculty of Massey University in 2002, being appointed as full professor. She also served as Acting Assistant Vice-Chancellor (Academic). Notable doctoral students of Mallon include Fiona Edgar, professor of management at the University of Otago.

Mallon's research focused on different types of employment, such as contract and permanent employment, and 'portfolio careers' and 'odyssey careers'. She was commissioned to research on perceptions of teachers and teaching careers by the Ministry of Education and the New Zealand Teachers Council. Mallon was involved with a number of societies, including the European Group for Organization Studies, the Academy of Management, and the Australian and New Zealand Academy of Management.

Mallon died on 19 March 2006 after an illness. Massey offers a memorial scholarship in her memory, for postgraduate research in human resources.

== Selected works ==
- Mallon, Mary; Joanne Duberley (2000). "Managers and professionals in the contingent workforce". Human Resource Management Journal. 10 (1): 33–47. doi:10.1111/j.1748-8583.2000.tb00012.x. Wikidata Q125659003.
- Bruce Small; Mallon, Mary (2007). "Science, Society, Ethics, and Trust: Scientists' Reflections on the Commercialization and Democratization of Science". International Studies of Management and Organization. 37 (1): 103–124. doi:10.2753/imo0020-8825370105. Wikidata Q125659004.
- Joanne Duberley; Cohen, Laurie; Mallon, Mary (2006). "Constructing Scientific Careers: Change, Continuity and Context". Organization Studies. 27 (8): 1131–1151. doi:10.1177/0170840606064105. Wikidata Q57781589.
- Jane Bryson; Karl Pajo; Robyn Ward; Mallon, Mary (2006). "Learning at work: organisational affordances and individual engagement". Journal of Workplace Learning. 18 (5): 279–297. doi:10.1108/13665620610674962. Wikidata Q125659038.
- Joanne Duberley; Mallon, Mary; Cohen, Laurie (2006). "Exploring career transitions: accounting for structure and agency". Personnel Review. 35 (3): 281–296. doi:10.1108/00483480610656694. Wikidata Q57781595.
- Mallon, Mary; Joanne Duberley; Cohen, Laurie (2005). "Careers in public sector science: orientations and implications". R and D Management. 35 (4): 395–407. doi:10.1111/j.1467-9310.2005.00397.x. Wikidata Q57781604.
- Julia Richardson; Mallon, Mary (2005). "Career interrupted? The case of the self-directed expatriate". Journal of World Business. 40 (4): 409–420. doi:10.1016/j.jwb.2005.08.008. Wikidata Q125659039.
- Mallon, Mary; Sara Walton (2005). "Career and learning: the ins and the outs of it". Personnel Review. 34 (4): 468–487. doi:10.1108/00483480510599789. Wikidata Q125659040.
- Mallon, Mary; Joanne Duberley (2000). "Managers and professionals in the contingent workforce". Human Resource Management Journal. 10 (1): 33–47. doi:10.1111/j.1748-8583.2000.tb00012.x. Wikidata Q125659003.
