= Cín Lae Uí Mhealláin =

Cín Lae Uí Mhealláin is an account of the Irish Confederate Wars written by Tarlach Ó Mealláin, OFM.

Described as "an account of the progress of the Confederate war from the outbreak of rebellion in 1641 until February 1647" its text "reflected the Ulster Catholic point of view."

== Description ==
The text was first described as Cín Lae Uí Mhealláin by Professor Tadhg Ó Donnchadha in 1931, Cín Lae being the Irish term for 'diary.' It is written on both sides of twenty-two small sheets of paper (approximately 18.5 cm by 14 cm). The narrative comes to an abrupt end on the 28th line of page forty-four; "Tanic trí mile saigdeor ón Pharlemeint i nÁth C. i n-aghaidh Laighneach agus each...."

It is housed at the Boole Library at University College, Cork, as MS 3.

== Facets ==
In his introduction to the text, Charles Dillon points out that:

Tarlach had a detailed knowledge of the Ulster leaders. As he was familiar too with many of the places in which they fought, he is an invaluable source for the general historian, toponomyst and genealogist and, because of his language, he is an invaluable source for the linguist and the historian of Irish as well.

== Reasons for composition ==
Ó Doibhlin opines that

[It] might have been more accurately named a Commonplace Book kept by Ó Mealláin, possibly at the instigation of the leader of the rebellion, Sir Pheilim O'Neill of Caledon. It looks very much like a notebook the writer had with him in the field and he may have hoped that the notes taken down would at some stage in the future act as an aide memoire for a fuller, more extensive account.

Charles Dillon concurs, stating that

The Cín Lae was written in abbreviated form, apparently as a memory aid to the author who may have intended to produce a fuller history of the period at a later date. Sadly, no such history appears to have been written ... [although] ... he ... had the opportunity of revising at least part of the script.

== Extracts ==
The text begins thus:

One the eve of the Feast of Saint John Capistranus the lords of Ulster planned to seize in one night, unknown to the English and the Scots, all their walled towns, castles and bawns. The date chosen was 22nd October, Friday to be precise, and the last day of the moon. [Saturday 23 October 1641, Old Style]

On one occasion Ó Mealláin describes O'Neill rousing the troops:

Do bhí an General ag teagasc imeasc an tsloigh. Iseadh adubhairt 'Ag sud chuagaibh escairde Dé agus naimhde bhur n-anma; agus denaidh calmacht 'na n-aghadh aniu; oir is iad do ben dibh ar (leg. bhur) dtigheranaidh, bhur gclann agus bhur mbeatha spiordalta agus temporalta, do bhen bhur nduthaigh dibh, is do chuir ar deoruigheach sibh etc."/"The General was in the midst of his men exorting them. 'Here before you are the enemies of God, and your souls enemies; and be courageous against them today for it is they who took away your lordships, your families, your spiritual and temporal lives, and sent you into exile.

Elsewhere, he describes the terrible effect of the war on the general population (daoine san tír):

Atá, daoine san tír, Cathanaigh, Duibhlinigh, muinter Ara, Ibh Eathach agus clann Aodh Bui uile an Ruta ag ithe capall, each: deireadh earraigh; a ghoid; fuadach cat, madraidh; ag ithe daoine, leathar carbaidhi, agus leathar fo na aol." "There are people in the country, O'Kanes, O'Devlins, the people of Ara and Iveagh, inhabitants of Clandeboy and the Route eating horsemeat; the end of spring; thieving and the stealing of dogs and cats; cannibalism, eating the leather of carriages and leather treated with lime.

Other occasions described include a number of combats and battles, such as Benburb.

== See also ==
- Irish Rebellion of 1641
- Irish Confederate Wars
- Henry Ó Mealláin
- Feardorcha Ó Mealláin
