= An Díbirt go Connachta =

Poem in Irish

An Díbirt go Connachta is a lament attributed to Feardorcha Ó Mealláin who is claimed as staraí Éirí amach 1641/the historian of the 1641 Rising, Tarlach Ó Mealláin.

It is a lament in Irish inspired by the proposed scheme of the early 1650s to transplant the 'delinquent' Irish to Connacht.
