= Feardorcha Ó Mealláin =

Irish poet

Feardorcha Ó Mealláin was an Irish poet the reputed author of An Díbirt go Connachta. He is said to have been a Franciscan, possibly from County Down, but both of these claims are in doubt. It is suggested that his name may be a 'pet-name' for two of his kinsmen, Henry Ó Mealláin or Tarlach Ó Mealláin, who may also be its author.

== See also ==
- Aodh Buidhe Mac an Bhaird
- Michael Shiell
- Luke Wadding
- Henry Ó Mealláin
