= Laurie Cohen =

Laurie Cohen is a British academic. She is a professor of work and organisation at the Nottingham University Business School. Cohen is the editor-in-chief of Work, Employment & Society.

She completed a B.A. at Colgate University. Cohen earned a postgraduate certificate and M.A. at Sheffield City Polytechnic and a PhD at Sheffield Hallam University.

== Selected works ==
- Tietze, Susanne; Cohen, Laurie; Musson, Gill (2003). Understanding Organizations through Language. SAGE. ISBN 978-1-4129-3365-0.
