= Tam Lenfestey =

Guernsey poet

Thomas "Tam" Lenfestey (1818–1885), was a farmer and poet based in Guernsey. He published poetry in Guernsey newspapers and in book form.

His "Chanson de la ribotresse", referring to a peasant woman making butter who celebrates the arrival of spring, became a popular folksong in Guernsey.

== Works ==
- Le Chant des Fontaines (1875)
