= Thomas Henry Mahy =

Thomas Henry Mahy (5 October 1862 – 21 April 1936) wrote Dires et Pensées du Courtil Poussin, a regular column in Guernésiais in La Gazette Officielle de Guernesey, from 1916 to 1921. A collection was published in booklet form in 1922. He was still publishing occasional pieces of poetry and prose by the start of the 1930s.

Mahy was also the 1st cousin once removed of Norman-French poet Denys Corbet. Mahy is the third cousin five times removed of noted Canadian artist Christian Corbet.
