= Tarlach Ó Mealláin =

Irish writer

Tarlach Ó Mealláin (fl. 1641–1650) was an Irish Franciscan, author of Cín Lae Uí Mhealláin.

== Origins and background ==
Ó Mealláin was of a Tír Eoghain ecclesiastical family who were the hereditary keepers of the Bell of Saint Patrick (Clog na hUachta). They ruled an area known as An Mheallánacht, located between Slieve Gallon and Lough Neagh. They expanded southwards, one branch settling in Donaghmore, a second in Clonfeacle. Their lands between the Moy and Dungannon were known as Grange O Mellan. Churchland near Armagh was called Lurga Uí Mhealláin (Lurgyvallen). It is not known to which branch he belonged.

Tarlach joined a community of Franciscans who had been expelled from their convent in Armagh in the 16th century and settled in Tyrone under the protection of the Ó Neills of Cashlan. They built a friary in the townland of Gort Tamlach na Muc on the south side of Friary Loch. It was attacked and burned by the Scots on the morning of 15 June 1643.

He has been described as one "who reflected the Ulster Catholic view of events. He was one of a generation of ardent Franciscans who were tireless in their efforts to record the Irish past for coming generations."

== Cín Lae Uí Mhealláin and the Irish Confederate Wars ==
Tarlach was the chaplain to Felim O'Neill of Kinard during the war, and thus was present at many of the events he describes in the Cín Lae. Examples include the battle of Clones (13 June 1643) and the Battle of Benburb in 1646, of which he says Do bhenadar na sloite da cheile ar Dhruim Fhliuch ("The armies met on Drum Flugh"), thereby precisely identifying the battlefield.

"Tarlach had a detailed knowledge of the Ulster leaders. As he was familiar too with many of the places in which they fought, he is an invaluable source for the general historian, toponomyst and genealogist and, because of his language, he is an invaluable source for the linguist and the historian of Irish as well."

"The Cín Lae was written in abbreviated form, apparently as a memory aid to the author who may have intended to produce a fuller history of the period at a later date. Sadly, no such history appears to have been written ... [although] ... he ... had the opportunity of revising at least part of the script."

It is written on both sides of twenty-two small sheets of paper (approximately 18.5 cm by 14 cm). The narrative comes to an abrupt end on the 28th line of page forty-four: "Tanic trí mile saigdeor ón Pharlemeint i nÁth C. i n-aghaidh Laighneach agus each ..."

== Extracts ==
Page one:

"On the eve of the Feast of Saint John Capistranus the lords of Ulster planned to seize in one night, unknown to the English and the Scots, all their walled towns, castles and bawns. The date chosen was 22nd October, Friday to be precise, and the last day of the moon." (Saturday 23 October 1641, Old Style)

== After 1647 ==
A reference to the Battle of Scarrifholis (June 1650) within the Cín Lae indicates that he was still alive at that date, though his diary ends in 1647. He has been proposed as the attributed author of An Díbirt go Connachta which refers to the transplantations of the mid-1650s, but this is uncertain.

== See also ==
- Irish Confederate Wars
- Henry Ó Mealláin
- Feardorcha Ó Mealláin
