= George B. Mallon =

American journalist (1865–1928)

George Barry Mallon (May 20, 1865 – January 13, 1928) was an editor for The Sun (New York) from Malone, New York. He was active in New York City literary circles for forty years as both a writer and an editor.

== Early life ==
Mallon was the son of Michael S. and Martha Elizabeth Barry Mallon, who resided at 50 Washington St., Malone, NY. He graduated from Amherst College in 1887 and studied at Franklin Academy prior to this.

== Career as a journalist ==
He came to New York City in the fall of 1887, working as a reporter for the Commercial Advertiser. In 1888 Mallon joined Charles A. Dana's The Sun, being promoted to assistant city editor in 1895 and city editor in 1903. He continued in this position for a decade, training a number of young newspaper writers. He resigned from The Sun in 1912 and took a job with the Butterick Publishing Company, which printed the Delineator, one of the largest circulating women's magazines. On the occasion of his leaving the newspaper, The Sun Alumni Association gave a luncheon in his honor at the Hotel Brevoort. Charles S. Whitman, district attorney of New York and later the state's governor, was among those in attendance.

When the United States entered World War I Mallon started a weekly newspaper in New Jersey called War Thrift. He employed it effectively as a tool for raising thrift stamps. During his association with Bankers Trust Company he presided over their publication which pertained to economic and financial subjects. It concentrated particularly on the financial situations of England, France, and Canada.

Mallon was a popular after dinner speaker during the ten years (1919-1928) he was president of the Dutch Treat Club and as an associate of the Amherst Alumni Association.

== Private life ==
He married Irene Stuyvesant Black in 1895, and they first resided in the Fort Slocum district in New Rochelle, before moving to New Jersey. She was the daughter of Josephine Appleby Black and William T. Black, a former city surveyor of New York and treasurer of the Republican Club. Her grandfather was Job Lippincott Black, superintendent of public works in New York in 1848. Irene died in 1923; their married daughter Frances 'Pat' Lippincott French died in 1969. Mallon's death was attributed to leucocythemia. He died in Baltimore, Maryland at Howard Kelly Hospital.
