= Henry Ó Mealláin =

17th-century Irish friar

Henry Ó Mealláin, O.F.M. (c. 1579 – after 1642) was an Irish Franciscan friar, and sometime Guardian of the Franciscan Friars of Armagh.

Ó Mealláin was born in Dromiskin, County Louth, and educated at the Irish College of Salamanca. He returned to Ireland in 1605 as a priest. In 1625 he was nominated for the see of Armagh, but Aodh Mac Aingil was chosen instead.

He has been mistaken as the author of Cín Lae Uí Mhealláin, which was written by his kinsman, Tarlach Ó Mealláin. Tarlach attended a sermon preached by Henry at Carnteel on the first Sunday of Lent in 1642, and mentioned it in his Cín Lae, demonstrating that he and Henry were two different people.

== Sources ==
- Charles Dillon: Cín Lae Uí Mhealláin, pp. 337–95 Tyrone:History and Society. ISBN 0-906602-71-8
- Diarmaid Ó Doibhlin (2000): Tyrone's Gaelic Literary Legacy, pp. 414–17, op.cit.
