= Philippe Le Sueur Mourant =

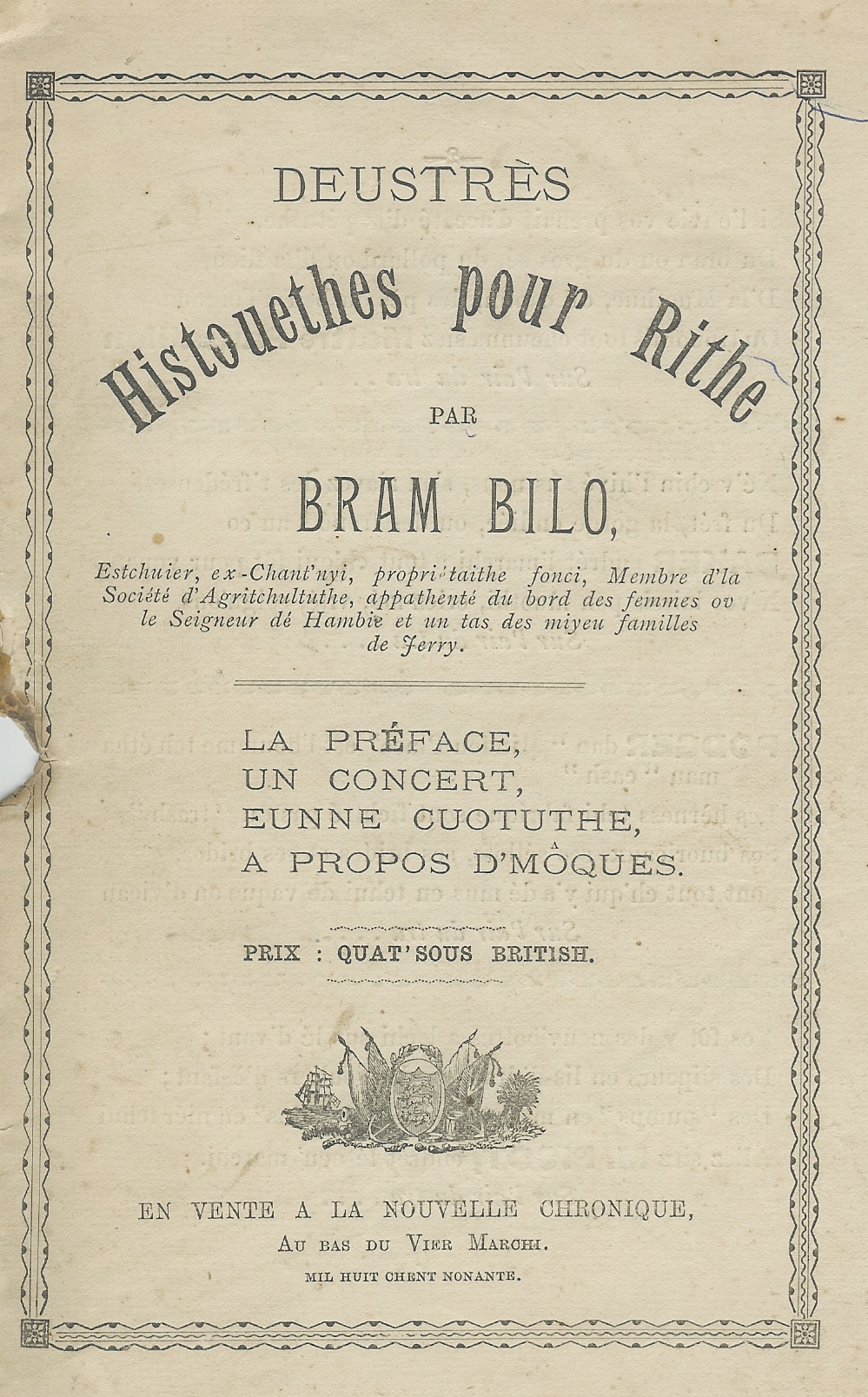
A collection of Bram Bilo stories published in 1890

Philippe Le Sueur Mourant (1848 – 21 August 1918) was a Jersey writer who wrote in Jèrriais and French.

He was born in St Saviour in 1848 and spent most of his early life working in agriculture in Newfoundland and Lorient. He returned to Jersey in 1880 and launched a series of stories in La Nouvelle Chronique de Jersey which took the form of letters supposedly written by Bram Bilo, a naïve and self-important ex-Centenier from St Ouen. These stories achieved great popularity (some remain classics, such as "Bram Bilo à la vendue" (Bram Bilo at the auction)) and a selection were republished in book form.

Besides writing in Jèrriais in La Nouvelle Chronique de Jersey, he also wrote in French under the pen name Samuel in La Chronique de Jersey.

He killed off his Bram Bilo character, and in 1911 he launched a new set of comical characters, the Pain family, in a series of Jèrriais stories in the English language newspaper Morning News. In contrast to the countryside character of Bram Bilo, the Pains (Peter and Laizé and their hapless daughter Lonore) represented a family moved from the country to the bustling capital of Saint Helier with its anglicised society and entertainments. Some of the Pain stories were reprinted in La Chronique de Jersey, but the series subsequently transferred to the Evening Post.
