= Denys Corbet =

Guernsey poet and painter (1826–1909)

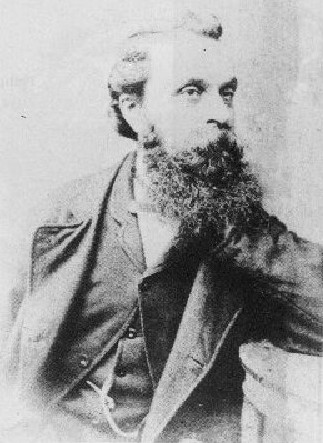
Denys Corbet

Denys Corbet (22 May 1826 – 21 April 1909) was a Guernsey poet, naïve painter, and schoolmaster, the second son of Pierre Corbet (1793–1886), a seafarer, and Susanne (née de Beaucamp)whom he married in 1813. He was born at La Turquie, Vale, Guernsey, Channel Islands and is thought to have lost his parents in childhood. He married, probably in 1852, Mary "Elizabeth" Wellington (1833–1909) and had six children. Corbet wrote, for the most part, in the Dgèrnésiais or Guernsey French language.

== "Last Poet" ==
Corbet described himself as the Le Draïn Rimeux (The Last Poet). He is best known for his poems, notably the epic L'Touar de Guernesy, a picaresque tour of the parishes of Guernsey, Les Feuilles de la Fôret (The Leaves of the Forest, 1871), and Les Chànts du drain rimeux, ou Pièces de poësie originale en guernesiais et en français (Songs of the Last Rhymer, or Original Pieces of Poetry in Dgèrnésiais and French, 1884). As editor of the French-language newspaper Le Bailliage, he also wrote prose columns in Dgèrnésiais under the pen name Badlagoule (Chatterbox).

The French scholar R. J. Lebarbenchon, in a 1988 tribute, described Corbet as "philanthrope, pacifiste, partisan du progrès, apôtre de l'instruction publique, il se classe aussi parmi les modernes et a foi en l'avenir" (philanthropist, pacifist, supporter of progress, apostle of public education, he ranks also among the moderns and has faith in the future).

== Centenary ==
Today Denys Corbet is largely remembered as a naïve painter of rural life. The Canadian artist Christian Corbet is a collateral descendant. A special exhibition to mark the centenary of Corbet's death was held on 30–31 May 2009 at the Forest Douzaine, Forest, Guernsey, where a portrait of Denys Corbet painted by Christian Corbet was unveiled by Hazel Cotgrove, a great-granddaughter of Denys's.

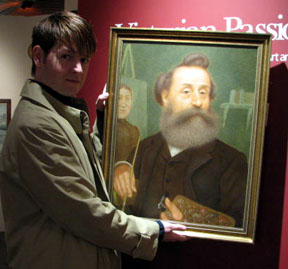
Christian Corbet holding a self-portrait of Denys Corbet Coll. Guernsey Museum and Gallery, 2006
