= Index of Guernsey-related articles =

This page list topics related to the Bailiwick of Guernsey, including Guernsey, Alderney, Sark and smaller islands.

== 0-9 ==
- .gg
- 1987 Island Games
- 2-REG aircraft registration
- 2003 Island Games
- 2023 Island Games
- 2007 Alderney UFO sighting
- -hou

== A ==
- Air Alderney
- Alderney
- Alderney Airport
- Alderney camps
- Alderney Lighthouse
- Alderney pound
- Alderney Race
- Alderney Railway
- Alderney Society Museum
- Alderney referendum
- Archaeology of the Channel Islands
- Arsenal Ground (Mount Hale)
- Artparks Sculpture Park
- Auregnais dialect
- Aurigny

== B ==
- Bailiff (Channel Islands)
- Bailiff of Guernsey
- Bailiwick
- Bailiwick of Guernsey
- Baron de Saumarez
- Batterie Mirus
- BBC Radio Guernsey
- Bibliography of Guernsey
- Blanchelande College
- Blue Islands
- Bordeaux Harbour
- Braye Beach Hotel
- Braye du Valle, Guernsey
- Braye Harbour
- Braye Road railway station
- Brecqhou
- Bréhon Tower
- British Channel Island Ferries
- British–Irish Council
- Burhou

== C ==
- Casquets lighthouses
- Castel, Guernsey
- Castle Cornet
- Catholic Church in Guernsey
- Channel Islands
- Channel Islands Co-operative Society
- Channel Islands Electricity Grid
- Channel Islands in the Wars of the Three Kingdoms
- Channel Islands Occupation Society
- Channel Islands Stock Exchange
- Channel Islands Witch Trials
- Chapel of St Apolline, Guernsey
- Chief Minister of Guernsey
- Channel Islands Competition and Regulatory Authorities
- Civilian life under the German occupation of the Channel Islands
- Clameur de haro
- Coat of arms of Guernsey
- Condor Ferries
- Connétable (Jersey and Guernsey)
- Courts of Guernsey
- COVID-19 pandemic in Guernsey
- Crevichon
- Crown dependencies
- Culture of Guernsey

== D ==
- Daniel de Lisle Brock
- Deportations from the German-occupied Channel Islands
- Dexion Absolute
- Doyle Monument
- Duchy of Normandy

== E ==
- Ebenezer Le Page
- Elections in Alderney
  - 2006 Alderney general election
  - 2008 Alderney general election
  - 2010 Alderney general election
  - 2012 Alderney general election
  - 2014 Alderney general election
  - 2016 Alderney general election
  - 2018 Alderney general election
  - 2020 Alderney general election
  - 2022 Alderney general election
- Elections in Guernsey
  - 2004 Guernsey general election
  - 2008 Guernsey general election
  - 2012 Guernsey general election
  - 2016 Guernsey general election
  - 2020 Guernsey general election
- Electoral firsts in Guernsey
- Elizabeth College, Guernsey
- Enemy at the Door
- Evacuation of civilians from the Channel Islands in 1940
- External relations of Guernsey

== F ==
- FAB Link
- Fishing in Guernsey
- Flag of Guernsey
- Footes Lane
- Forest, Guernsey
- Fort Clonque
- Fort George, Guernsey
- Fort Grey
- Fort Hommet
- Fort Hommet 10.5 cm Coastal Defence Gun Casement Bunker
- Fort Saumarez
- Fort Tourgis

== G ==
- Geology of Guernsey
- George Torode
- German fortification of Guernsey
- German occupation of the Channel Islands
- GFCTV
- Golden Guernsey
- Greffier
- Guernésiais
- Guernsey
- Guernsey Airport
- Guernsey Ambulance and Rescue Service
- Guernsey at the Commonwealth Games

Guernsey at the 2006 Commonwealth Games
Guernsey at the 2010 Commonwealth Games
Guernsey at the 2014 Commonwealth Games
Guernsey at the 2018 Commonwealth Games
Guernsey at the 2022 Commonwealth Games

- Guernsey Bean Jar
- Guernsey Border Agency
- Guernsey cattle
- Guernsey (clothing)
- Guernsey Cricket Board
- Guernsey cricket team
- Guernsey Electricity
- Guernsey F.C.
- Guernsey Festival of Performing Arts
- Guernsey Financial Services Commission
- Guernsey Football Association
- Guernsey Gâche
- Guernsey Grammar School and Sixth Form Centre
- Guernsey lily
- Guernsey loophole towers
- Guernsey Martyrs
- Guernsey national netball team
- Guernsey official football team
- Guernsey Post
- Guernsey pound
- Guernsey Press and Star
- Guernsey Railway
- Guernsey Rangers F.A.C.
- Guernsey RFC
- Guernsey Rovers A.C.
- Guernsey-variant British passport
- Guernsey women's cricket team
- GY postcode area

== H ==
- Hauteville House
- HD Ferries
- Health in Guernsey
- Healthspan
- Herm
- History of Guernsey
- HMS Charybdis (88)
- Houmets
- HUGO (cable system)

== I ==
- Icart Point
- Inter-insular match
- International Island Games Association
- Islam in Guernsey
- Island FM
- Island Games
  - 1987 Island Games
  - 2003 Island Games
  - 2023 Island Games
- ISO 3166-2:GG
- ITV Channel Television

== J ==
- Jackson League
- James Saumarez, 1st Baron de Saumarez
- Jerbourg Point
- Jethou

== L ==
- La Fregate Hotel (Guernsey)
- La Grande Mare
- La Mare de Carteret School
- La Sablonnerie
- Ladies' College
- Lager Borkum
- Lager Helgoland
- Lager Norderney
- Lager Sylt
- Languages of the Bailiwick of Guernsey
- Law of Guernsey
- Leader of Alderney
- Les Casquets
- Les Hanois Lighthouse
- LGBT rights in Guernsey
- Liberation of the German-occupied Channel Islands
- Lieutenant Governor of Guernsey
- Lihou
- List of artists from Guernsey
- List of aviation accidents and incidents in the Channel Islands
- List of bailiffs of Guernsey
- List of banks in Guernsey
- List of churches, chapels and meeting halls in the Channel Islands
- List of diplomatic missions in Guernsey
- List of governors of Guernsey
- List of hoards in the Channel Islands
- List of islands of the Bailiwick of Guernsey
- List of laws of Guernsey
- List of lighthouses in the Channel Islands
- List of newspapers in Guernsey
- List of people from Guernsey
- List of postage stamps of Alderney
- List of postage stamps of Guernsey
- List of schools in Guernsey
- List of shipwrecks in the Channel Islands
- List of supermarket chains in Guernsey
- List of windmills in Guernsey
- Little Chapel
- Little Roussel
- Little Sark
- Living with the enemy in the German-occupied Channel Islands
- Longis

== M ==
- Mannez Quarry railway station
- Maritime history of the Channel Islands
- Mignot Memorial Hospital
- Muratti Vase
- Music of the Channel Islands

== N ==
- National Trust of Guernsey
- Nerine sarniensis
- No. 201 Squadron RAF

== O ==
- Operation Ambassador
- Operation Basalt
- Operation Dryad
- Operation Hardtack (commando raid)
- Operation Huckaback
- Our Lady of the Rosary Church, Saint Peter Port
- Outline of Guernsey

== P ==
- Parishes of Guernsey
- Peter de Havilland
- Pleinmont-Torteval
- Policy Council of Guernsey
- Politics of Guernsey
- Postage stamps and postal history of Guernsey
- President of the States of Alderney
- Priaulx League
- Priaulx Library

== R ==
- Rail transport in Guernsey
- Randalls Brewery
- Resistance to German occupation of the Channel Islands
- Royal charters applying to the Channel Islands
- Royal Commission on the Constitution (United Kingdom)
- Royal Guernsey Light Infantry
- Royal Guernsey Militia
- Rugby union in the Bailiwick of Guernsey

== S ==
- Saint Andrew, Guernsey
- Saint Anne, Alderney
- Saint Martin, Guernsey
- Saint Peter, Guernsey
- Saint Peter Port
- Saint Peter Port Harbour
- Saint Peter Port Lifeboat Station
- Saint Peter Port North
- Saint Peter Port South
- Saint Sampson, Guernsey
- Saint Saviour, Guernsey
- Sandpiper CI
- Sark
- Sark during the German occupation of the Channel Islands
- Sark football team
- Sarnia: An Island Sequence
- Sarnia Cherie
- Sausmarez Manor
- Scouting in Guernsey
- Sercquiais
- Siam Cup
- Specsavers
- Sport in Guernsey
- SS Vega (1913)
- St James, Guernsey
- St Martin’s Parish Church, Guernsey
- St Sampson's High School
- St. Malo & Binic Steam Ship Company
- St. Martins A.C.
- States of Alderney
- States of Alderney Member
- States of Guernsey
- States of Guernsey Police Service
- Sure (company)
- Sylvans S.C.

== T ==
- The Blockhouse
- The Book of Ebenezer Le Page
- The Corbet Field
- The Crown
- The Guernsey Literary and Potato Peel Pie Society
- The International Stock Exchange
- The Swinge
- The Track
- The Vale Church, Guernsey
- Torteval, Guernsey
- Town Church, Guernsey
- Transport in Guernsey
- Trident Charter Company

== V ==
- Val des Terres Hill Climb
- Vale, Guernsey
- Vale Recreation F.C.
- VAT-free imports from the Channel Islands
- Vehicle registration plates of the Bailiwick of Guernsey
- Vergée
- Viaer Marchi
- Victor Hugo
- Victoria Tower, Guernsey
- Visite du branchage

== W ==
- White House (Herm)
- William Caparne
- Windmills in Guernsey

== See also ==
- Lists of country-related topics - similar lists for other countries
