= Outline of the Bailiwick of Guernsey =

Overview of and topical guide to the Bailiwick of Guernsey

The Flag of the Bailiwick of Guernsey

The Coat of arms of the Bailiwick of Guernsey

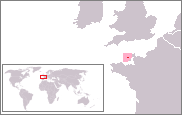
The location of the Bailiwick of Guernsey

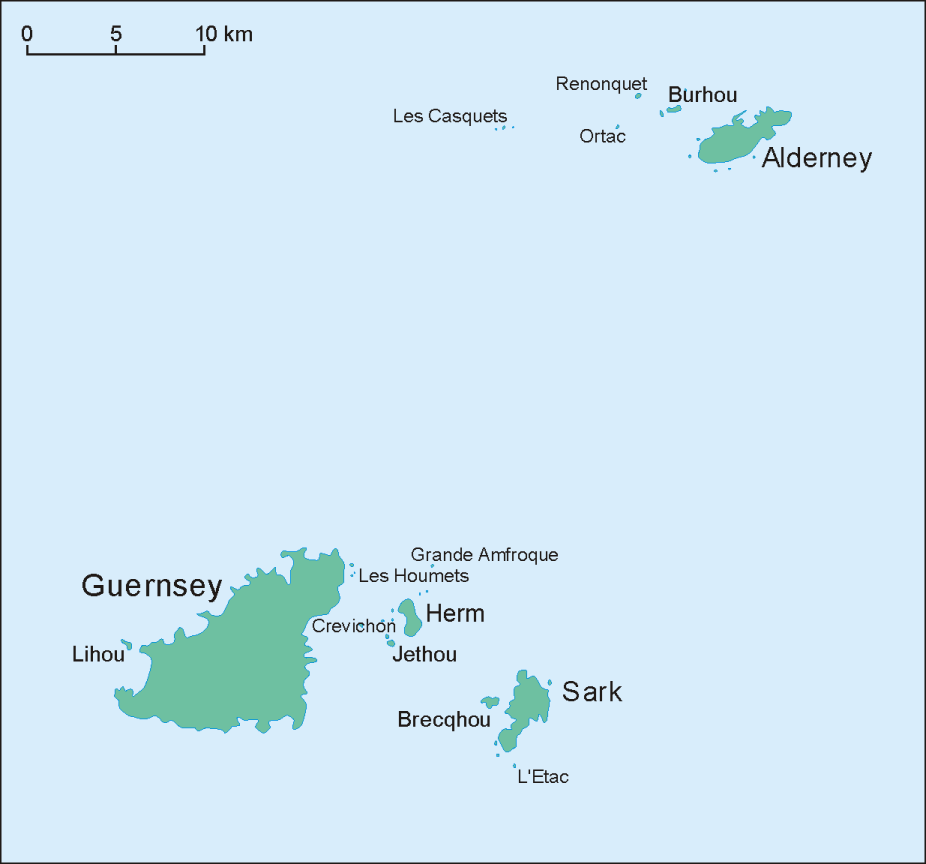
An enlargeable map of the Bailiwick of Guernsey

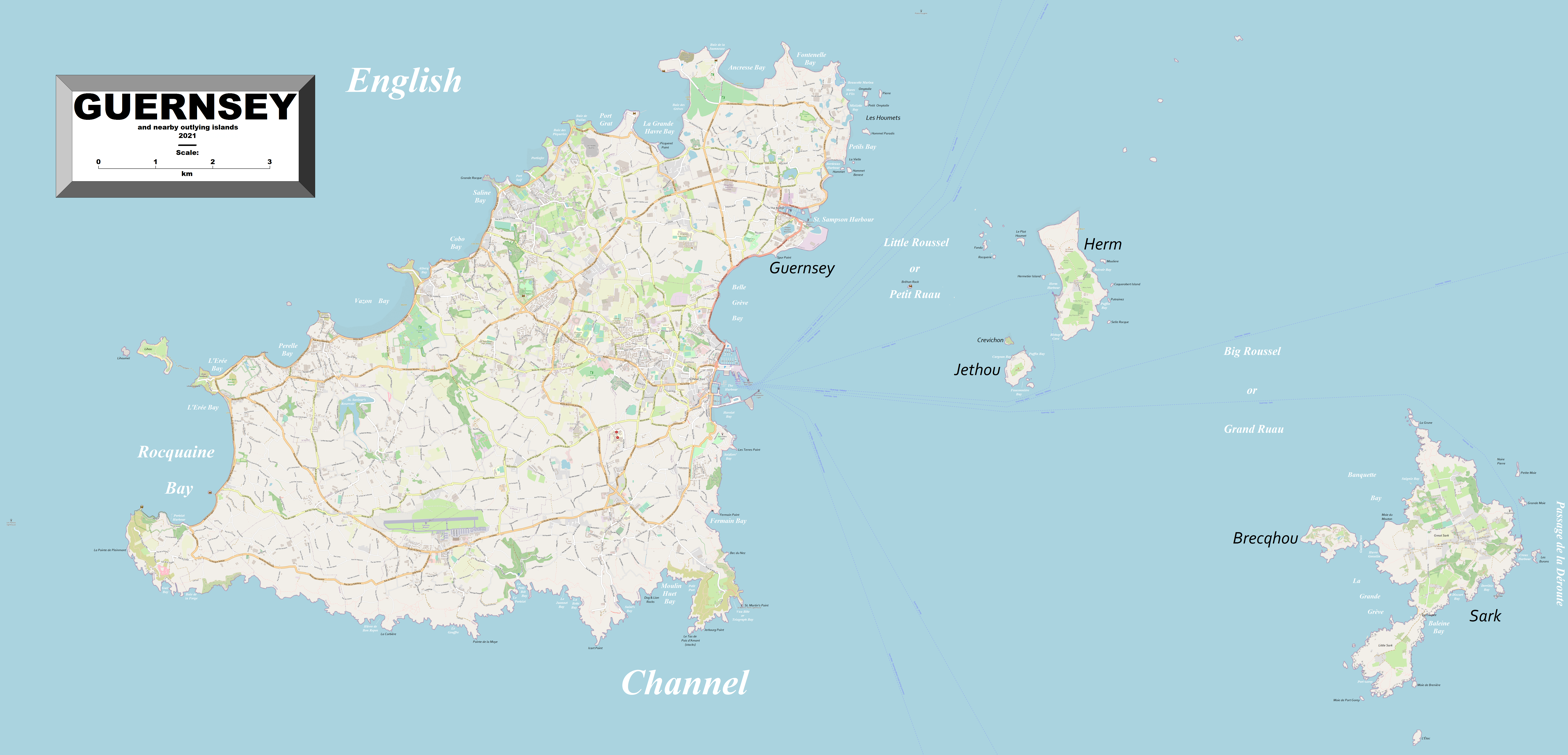
Enlargeable, detailed map of Guernsey and nearby islands

The following outline is provided as an overview of and topical guide to the Bailiwick of Guernsey:

The Bailiwick of Guernsey – British Crown dependency located in the Channel Islands off the coast of Normandy.

As well as the Isle of Guernsey, the bailiwick also comprises Alderney, Sark, Herm, Jethou, Brecqhou, Burhou, Lihou and other islets. Although the defence of all these islands is the responsibility of the United Kingdom, the Bailiwick of Guernsey is not part of the UK but rather a separate possession of the Crown, comparable to the Isle of Man. The Bailiwick of Guernsey is also not part of the European Union. The island of Guernsey is divided into ten parishes. Together with the Bailiwick of Jersey, it is included in the collective grouping known as the Channel Islands. The Bailiwick of Guernsey belongs to the Common Travel Area.

== General reference ==
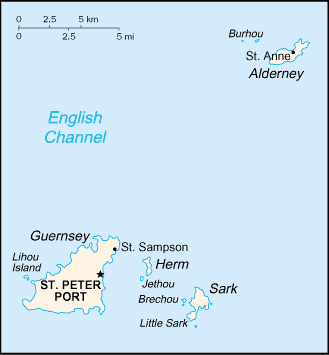
An enlargeable basic map of the Bailiwick of Guernsey

- Pronunciation: /ˈɡɜːrnzi/
- Common English country name: Guernsey
- Official English country name: The Bailiwick of Guernsey
- Common endonym(s):
- Official endonym(s):
- Adjectival(s):
- Demonym(s):
- Etymology: Name of Guernsey
- ISO country codes: GG, GGY, 831
- ISO region codes: See ISO 3166-2:GG
- Internet country code top-level domain: .gg

== Geography of Guernsey ==
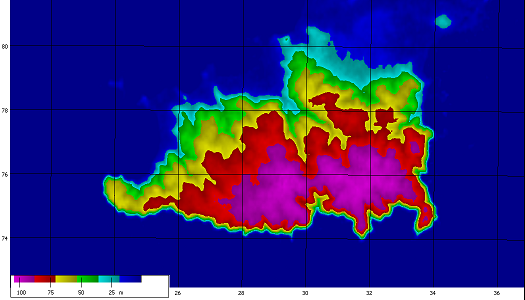
An enlargeable topographic map of the island of Guernsey

Geography of Guernsey

- Guernsey is: A British Crown dependency
- Location:
  - Northern Hemisphere and Western Hemisphere
    - Europe
      - Northern Europe
  - Atlantic Ocean
    - English Channel
  - Time zone: Western European Time or Greenwich Mean Time (UTC+00), Western European Summer Time or British Summer Time (UTC+01)
  - Extreme points of Guernsey
    - High: Le Moulin on Sark 114 m (374 ft)
    - Low: English Channel 0 m
  - Land boundaries: none
  - Coastline: 50 km
- Population of Guernsey: 65,150 (March 2014) - 189th most populous country
- Area of Guernsey: 78 km^{2}
- Atlas of Guernsey

=== Environment of Guernsey ===
- Climate of Guernsey
- Geology of Guernsey
- Protected areas of Guernsey
  - Dark Sky Community, Sark from 2011
  - Ramsar sites

==== Natural geographic features of Guernsey ====
- World Heritage Sites in Guernsey: None

=== Regions of Guernsey ===
==== Administrative divisions of Guernsey ====
- Parishes of Guernsey

===== Municipalities of Guernsey =====
- Capital of Guernsey: St Peter Port

=== Demography of Guernsey ===
Demographics of Guernsey

== Government and politics of Guernsey ==
Politics of Guernsey

- Form of government: parliamentary representative democratic British Crown dependency
- Capital of Guernsey: St Peter Port
- Elections in Guernsey
- Political parties in Guernsey

=== Branches of the government of Guernsey ===
Government of Guernsey

==== Executive branch of the government of Guernsey ====
- Head of state: Bailiff of Guernsey,
- Head of government: Chief Minister,
- Cabinet of Guernsey: Policy Council of Guernsey

==== Legislative branch of the government of Guernsey ====
- Parliament of Guernsey (Unicameral)

==== Judicial branch of the government of Guernsey ====
Courts of Guernsey

- Royal Court

=== Foreign relations of Guernsey ===
Foreign relations of Guernsey

- Diplomatic missions in Guernsey

==== International organization membership ====
The Bailiwick of Guernsey is a member of:

- British-Irish Council (BIC)
- Universal Postal Union (UPU)

=== Law and order in Guernsey ===
Law of Guernsey

- Constitution of Guernsey
- Crime in Guernsey
- Human rights in Guernsey
  - LGBT rights in Guernsey
  - Freedom of religion in Guernsey
- Law enforcement in Guernsey

=== Military of Guernsey ===
Military of Guernsey

- Command
  - Commander-in-chief:
    - Lieutenant Governor
- Military history of Guernsey
  - Channel Islands Occupation Society
  - German occupation of the Channel Islands
  - Royal Guernsey Militia
  - Royal Guernsey Light Infantry
  - Fortifications of Guernsey
  - Fortifications of Alderney

=== Local government in Guernsey ===
  - States of Guernsey
  - States of Alderney
  - Chief Pleas Sark

== History of Guernsey ==
History of Guernsey

- Timeline of the history of Guernsey
- Current events of Guernsey
- German occupation of the Channel Islands
- German fortification of Guernsey
- Maritime history of the Channel Islands

== Culture of Guernsey ==
Culture of Guernsey

- Architecture of Guernsey
- Cuisine of Guernsey
  - Guernsey Bean Jar
  - Guernsey Gâche
- Festivals in Guernsey
  - Viaer Marchi
  - Guernsey Festival of Performing Arts
- Languages of Guernsey
- Media in Guernsey
  - Guernsey Press and Star
  - BBC Radio Guernsey
  - Island FM
  - ITV Channel Television
- National symbols of Guernsey
  - Coat of arms of Guernsey
  - Flag of Guernsey
  - National anthem of Guernsey
- People of Guernsey
- Public holidays in Guernsey
- Records of Guernsey
- Religion in Guernsey
  - List of churches, chapels and meeting halls in the Channel Islands
  - Islam in Guernsey
- World Heritage Sites in Guernsey: None

=== Art in Guernsey ===
- Art in Guernsey
- Cinema of Guernsey
- Literature of Guernsey
  - Victor Hugo
    - Toilers of the Sea
    - Les Misérables
    - Hauteville House
  - Ebenezer Le Page
    - The Book of Ebenezer Le Page
- Music of Guernsey
- Television in Guernsey
- Theatre in Guernsey

=== Sports in Guernsey ===
Sports in Guernsey

- Football in Guernsey
  - Guernsey F.C.
  - Jackson League
  - Priaulx League
  - Guernsey Rovers A.C.
  - Vale Recreation F.C.
  - Sark football team
  - Muratti Vase
- Cricket in Guernsey
  - Guernsey cricket team
  - Inter-insular match
- Guernsey at the Olympics
- Guernsey at the Island Games
- Motor Racing in Guernsey
  - Val des Terres Hill Climb
- Rugby in Guernsey
  - Guernsey RFC
  - Siam Cup
- Sport Facilities in Guernsey
  - Footes Lane
  - The Track
  - The Corbet Field

== Economy and infrastructure of Guernsey ==
Economy of Guernsey

- Economic rank, by nominal GDP: 2007 151st (one hundred and fifty first)
- Agriculture in Guernsey
  - Golden Guernsey
  - Guernsey cattle
- Banking in Guernsey
  - National Bank of Guernsey
- Communications in Guernsey
  - Internet in Guernsey
- Companies of Guernsey
- Currency of Guernsey: Pound
  - ISO 4217: n/a (informally GGP)
- Energy in Guernsey
  - Energy policy of Guernsey
  - Guernsey Electricity
  - Channel Islands Electricity Grid
  - Oil industry in Guernsey
- Health care in Guernsey
- Mining in Guernsey
- Regulators in Guernsey
  - Guernsey Financial Services Commission
- Stock Exchange
- Tourism in Guernsey
- Transport in Guernsey
  - Airports in Guernsey
  - Saint Peter Port Harbour
  - Braye Harbour, Alderney
  - Rail transport in Guernsey
  - Alderney Railway
  - Roads in Guernsey

== Education in Guernsey ==
Education in Guernsey

- List of schools in Guernsey

== See also ==
- Bailiwick of Guernsey
  - Alderney
  - Guernsey
  - Herm
  - Sark
- Index of Guernsey-related articles
- List of Guernsey-related topics
- Bibliography of Guernsey
- List of international rankings
- Outline of Europe
- Outline of geography
- Outline of the United Kingdom
