= List of aircraft registration prefixes =

This is a list of aircraft registration prefixes used by civil aircraft.

== Post-1928 allocations ==
=== Current allocations ===
The 1928 prefixes have been amended and added to over the years, with the current markings being:

Country or region	Registration prefix	Presentation and notes	
Afghanistan	YA	YA-AAA to YA-ZZZ	
Albania	ZA	ZA-AAA to ZA-ZZZ	
Algeria	7T	7T-VAA to 7T-VZZ (civilian); 7T-WAA to 7T-WZZ (military)	
Andorra	C3	C3-AAA to C3-ZZZ	
Angola	D2	D2-AAA to D2-ZZZ	
Anguilla	VP-A	VP-AAA to VP-AZZ	
Antigua and Barbuda	V2	V2-AAA to V2-ZZZ	
Argentina	LV	LV-AAA to LV-ZZZ (civilian type certified aircraft); LV-DAA to LV-EZZ (gliders); LV-DMA to LV-DMZ (demonstrator aircraft); LV-PAA to LV-PZZ (temporary import registrations); LV-F001 to LV-F999 (temporary manufacturer registrations, no longer used); LV-X001 to LV-X999 (experimental); LV-S001 to LV-S999 (LSA); LV-U001 to LV-U999 (ultralight); LV-UX001 to LV-UX999 (ultralight)	
Argentina	LQ	LQ-AAA to LQ-ZZZ (government-owned aircraft)	
Armenia	EK	23 aircraft registered as of July 2017. Formats include "EK" followed by three or five numbers (e.g. EK-225 and EK-65072).	
Aruba	P4	P4-AAA to P4-ZZZ	
Australia	VH	VH-AAA to VH-ZZZ; VH-22A to VH-ZZ9 (Note: Since 2022 the registration suffix may contain the numbers 2 to 9, so long as the combination contains at least one letter.)	
Austria	OE	OE-AAA to OE-ZZZ (Note: OE-AAA to OE-AZZ (single-engine aircraft up to 2,000 kg (4,400 lb) MTOW); OE-BAA to OE-BZZ (government aircraft); OE-CAA to OE-CZZ (single-engine aircraft up to 2,000 kg (4,400 lb) MTOW); OE-DAA to OE-DZZ (single-engine aircraft up to 2,000 kg (4,400 lb) MTOW, more than 3 seats); OE-EAA to OE-EZZ (single-engine aircraft 2,000–5,700 kg (4,400–12,600 lb) MTOW); OE-FAA to OE-FZZ (multi-engine aircraft up to 5,700 kg (12,600 lb) MTOW); OE-GAA to OE-GZZ (single/multi-engine aircraft 5,700–14,000 kg (12,600–30,900 lb) MTOW); OE-HAA to OE-HZZ (multi-engine aircraft 14,000–20,000 kg (31,000–44,000 lb) MTOW); OE-IAA to OE-IZZ (multi-engine aircraft above 20,000 kg (44,000 lb) MTOW); OE-KAA to OE-KZZ (single-engine aircraft up to 2,000 kg (4,400 lb) MTOW, more than 3 seats); OE-LAA to OE-LZZ (multi-engine aircraft above 20,000 kg (44,000 lb) MTOW); OE-RAA to OE-SZZ (lighter-than-air); OE-UAA to OE-UZZ (interim registrations); OE-VAA to OE-VZZ (experimental/test registrations); OE-WAA to OE-WZZ (amphibian and sea planes); OE-XAA to OE-XZZ (Rotary wings and helicopters); OE-YAA to OE-YZZ (unmanned aerial vehicles); OE-ZAA to OE-ZZZ (lighter-than-air)); OE-0001 to OE-9999 (Note: OE-0001 to OE-0999 (gliders/ultralights); OE-5000 to OE-5999 (gliders/ultralights); OE-6000 to OE-6989 (motorized hang/paragliders); OE-6990 to OE-6999 (motorized hang/paragliders, test registrations); OE-7000 to OE-7989 (aerodynamically-controlled ultralights); OE-7990 to OE-7999 (aerodynamically-controlled ultralights, test registrations); OE-8000 to OE-8989 (weight-controlled ultralights); OE-8990 to OE-8999 (weight-controlled ultralights, test registrations); OE-9000 to OE-9989 (motor gliders/ultralights); OE-9990 to OE-9999 (motor gliders/ultralights, test registrations))	
Azerbaijan	4K	4K-AZ1 to 4K-AZ999; 4K-10000 to 4K-99999	
Bahamas	C6	C6-AAA to C6-ZZZ	
Bahrain	A9C	A9C-AA to A9C-ZZ; A9C-AAA to A9C-ZZZ; A9C-AAAA to A9C-ZZZZ	
Bangladesh	S2	S2-AAA to S2-ZZZ	
Barbados	8P	8P-AAA to 8P-ZZZ	
Belarus	EW	EW-10000 to EW-99999 (ex-Soviet Union registrations); EW-100AA to EW-999ZZ (aircraft in general, except those listed below); EW-200PA to EW-299PA (reserved for Boeing 737 aircraft); EW-100PJ to EW-299PJ (reserved for CRJ aircraft); EW-001DA, EW-001PA, EW-001PB, EW-85815 (reserved for official use); EW-0001L to EW-9999L (reserved for balloons)	
Belgium	OO	OO-AAA to OO-PZZ; OO-RAA to OO-SZZ; OO-BAA to OO-BZZ (preferred for balloons); OO-YAA to OO-ZAA (preferred for gliders); OO-01 to OO-499 (home-built aircraft); OO-501 to OO-999 & OO-A01 to OO-Z99 (microlights)	
Belize	V3	V3-AAA to V3-ZZZ	
Benin	TY	TY-AAA to TY-ZZZ	
Bermuda	VP-B	VP-BAA to VP-BZZ	
Bermuda	VQ-B	VQ-BAA to VQ-BZZ	
Bhutan	A5	A5-AAA to A5-ZZZ	
Bolivia	CP	CP-1000 to CP-9999	
Bosnia and Herzegovina	E7	E7-AAA to E7-ZZZ	
Botswana	A2	A2-AAA to A2-ZZZ	
Brazil	PP	PP-AAA to PP-ZZZ (prior to the 1970s, reserved for public and parapublic aircraft)	Until the 1990s, helicopters were preferentially registered with an H after the prefix (example: PT-HNY)
Brazil	PT	PT-AAA to PT-ZZZ; PT-ZAA to PT-ZZZ (experimental non-LSA aircraft)	Until the 1990s, helicopters were preferentially registered with an H after the prefix (example: PT-HNY)
Brazil	PR	PR-AAA to PR-ZZZ; PR-ZAA to PR-ZZZ (experimental non-LSA aircraft)	Until the 1990s, helicopters were preferentially registered with an H after the prefix (example: PT-HNY)
Brazil	PU	PU-AAA to PU-ZZZ (microlights and experimental LSA aircraft)	Until the 1990s, helicopters were preferentially registered with an H after the prefix (example: PT-HNY)
Brazil	PS	PS-AAA to PS-ZZZ (available around 2018 onwards)	Until the 1990s, helicopters were preferentially registered with an H after the prefix (example: PT-HNY)
British Virgin Islands	VP-L	VP-LAA to VP-LZZ	
Brunei	V8	V8-AAA to V8-ZZZ; V8-AA1 to V8-ZZ9; V8-001 to V8-999	
Bulgaria	LZ	LZ-AAA to LZ-ZZZ	
Burkina Faso	XT	XT-AAA to XT-ZZZ	
Burundi	9U	9U-AAA to 9U-ZZZ	
Cambodia	XU	XU-AAA to XU-ZZZ	
Cameroon	TJ	TJ-AAA to TJ-ZZZ	
Canada	C (Note: Only C-F, C-G, C-I & CF- are allocated in Canada.)	C-FAAA to C-FZZZ; CF-AAA to CF-ZZZ (pre-1957 vintage aircraft may be registered CF- instead of C-F); C-GAAA to C-GZZZ; C-IAAA to C-IZZZ (ultralight aeroplanes only)	
Cape Verde	D4	D4-AAA to D4-ZZZ	
Cayman Islands	VP-C	VP-CAA to VP-CZZ	
Cayman Islands	VQ-C	VQ-CAA to VQ-CZZ	
Central African Republic	TL	TL-AAA to TL-ZZZ	
Chad	TT	TT-AAA to TT-ZZZ	
Chile	CC	CC-AAA to CC-ZZZ from July 1, 2009 onwards.; Gliders had numbers in between registrations (e.g., CC-K14W) and some balloons too (e.g., CC-P1).; Ultralights are registered with the markings ULM-number.	
China	B	B-0000 to B-9999; B-000A to B-99ZZ (general) (Note: Since 2018 the suffix may contain letters in last 2 positions. In this scheme the digit immediately after the dash indicates the type of aircraft. e.g. 2 for Boeing and 3 for Airbus.)	
Colombia	HJ	HJ-1000A to HJ-9999Z (microlights)	
Colombia	HK	HK-1000A to HK-9999Z	
Comoros	D6	D6-AAA to D6-ZZZ	
Congo, Republic of	TN	TN-AAA to TN-ZZZ	
Congo, Democratic Republic of	9S (Note: Does not figure in the ICAO document "AIRCRAFT NATIONALITY MARKS, NATIONAL EMBLEMS AND COMMON MARKS".)	9S-AAA to 9S-ZZZ	
Congo, Democratic Republic of	9T	9T-AAA to 9T-ZZZ (military)	
Cook Islands	E5	E5-AAA to E5-ZZZ	
Costa Rica	TI	TI-AAA to TI-ZZZ; TI-000 to TI-999 (ultralight aircraft)	
Croatia	9A	9A-AAA to 9A-ZZZ; 9A-GAA to 9A-GZZ (gliders); 9A-HAA to 9A-HZZ (helicopters); 9A-OAA to 9A-OZZ (balloons); 9A-UAA to 9A-UZZ (ultralights)	
Cuba	CU	CU-A1000 to CU-A1999 (agricultural Aircraft); CU-C1000 to CU-C1999 (airlines, cargo operations); CU-H1000 to CU-H1999 (helicopters); CU-N1000 to CU-N1999 (private Aircraft); CU-T1000 to CU-T1999 (airlines, passenger flights); CU-U1000 to CU-U1999 (ultralights)	
Cyprus	5B	5B-AAA to 5B-ZZZ	
Czech Republic	OK	OK-AAA to OK-ZZZ; OK-AAA 00 to OK-ZZZ 99 (microlights); OK-0000 to OK-9999 (gliders & balloons); OK-A000 to OK-A999 (ultralight gliders); OK-X000A to OK-X999Z (unmanned aircraft)	
Denmark	OY	OY-AAA to OY-ZZZ; OY-HAA to OY-HZZ (helicopters); Any registration containing X (gliders including Touring Motor Glider); OY-BAA to OY-BZZ (preferred for hot-air balloons); OY-81 to OY-8999 (ultralight trikes with weight shift control); OY-91 to OY-9999 (ultralight 3-axis); OY-1001 to OY-1999 (ultralight gyro)	
Djibouti	J2	J2-AAA to J2-ZZZ	
Dominica	J7	J7-AAA to J7-ZZZ	
Dominican Republic	HI	HI100AA to HI999ZZ; HI100 to HI1999	
East Timor	4W	4W-AAA to 4W-ZZZ	
Ecuador	HC	HC-AAA to HC-ZZZ	
Egypt	SU	SU-AAA to SU-XXZ; SU-ZAA to SU-ZZZ; SU-001 to SU-999 (gliders and balloons)	
El Salvador	YS	YS-AAA to YS-ZZZ	
Equatorial Guinea	3C	3C-AAA to 3C-ZZZ	
Eritrea	E3	E3-AAAA to E3-ZZZZ	
Estonia	ES	ES-AAA to ES-ZZZ; ES-0001 to ES-9999 (gliders and motor gliders)	
Eswatini	3D, 3DC	3DC-AAA to 3DC-ZZZ	
Ethiopia	ET	ET-AAA to ET-ZZZ	
Falkland Islands	VP-F	VP-FAA to VP-FZZ	
Fiji	DQ	DQ-AAA to DQ-ZZZ	
Finland	OH	OH-AAA to OH-ZZZ; OH-HAA to OH-HZZ (helicopters); OH-XAA to OH-XZZ (experimental aircraft); OH-LAA to OH-LZZ (Finnair aircraft); OH-001 to OH-999 (gliders and motor gliders); OH-1000 to OH-9999 (gliders and motor gliders); OH-G001 to OH-G999 (autogyros); OH-U001 to OH-U999 (ultralights)	
France	F	F-AAAA to F-ZZZZ; F-AYAA to F-AZZZ (historic aircraft); F-BAAA to F-BZZZ; F-GAAA to F-HZZZ (based in mainland France and Corsica); F-CAAA to F-CZZZ (gliders); F-OAAA to F-OZZZ (based outside mainland France and Corsica); F-PAAA to F-PZZZ (homebuilt); F-WAAA to F-WZZZ (test and delivery); F-DAAA to F-DZZZ (radio controlled model aircraft); F-JAAA to F-JZZZ (ultralight radio call signs); F-ZAAA to F-ZZZZ (state owned)	
France	INSEE code	"department number" -AA to -ZZ & -AAA to -ZZZ (ultralights) (e.g.: 59-ABC for the Nord département)	
French Guiana	F-O	F-OAAA to F-OZZZ for aircraft based outside of mainland France (Note: F-O is for aircraft based outside mainland France, but aircraft may also retain mainland F-B, F-G or F-H series.)	
French Polynesia	F-O	F-OAAA to F-OZZZ for aircraft based outside of mainland France	
French West Indies	F-O	F-OAAA to F-OZZZ for aircraft based outside of mainland France	
Gabon	TR	TR-AAA to TR-ZZZ; TR-KAA to TR-KZZ (military)	
Gambia	C5	C5-AAA to C5-ZZZ	
Georgia	4L	4L-AAA to 4L-ZZZ; 4L-10000 to 4L-99999	
Germany	D	D-AAAA to D-AZZZ (aircraft with more than 20 t MTOW); D-AUAA to D-AZZZ (test registrations for aircraft manufactured by Airbus at Finkenwerder); D-BAAA to D-BZZZ (aircraft with 14–20 t MTOW); D-CAAA to D-CZZZ (aircraft with 5.7–14 t MTOW); D-EAAA to D-EZZZ (single-engine aircraft up to 2 t MTOW); D-FAAA to D-FZZZ (single-engine aircraft with 2–5.7 t MTOW); D-GAAA to D-GZZZ (multi-engine aircraft up to 2 t MTOW); D-HAAA to D-HZZZ (rotorcraft); D-IAAA to D-IZZZ (multi-engine aircraft with 2–5.7 t MTOW); D-KAAA to D-KZZZ (powered gliders); D-LAAA to D-LZZZ (airships); D-MAAA to D-MZZZ (powered ultralight aircraft); D-NAAA to D-NZZZ (non-powered ultralight aircraft); D-OAAA to D-OZZZ (manned free balloons); D-0001 to D-9999 (gliders)	
Ghana	9G	9G-AAA to 9G-ZZZ	
Ghana	9GR	9GR-0AAA to 9GR-9ZZZ (remotely piloted aircraft)	
Gibraltar	VP-G	VP-GAA to VP-GZZ	
Greece	SX	SX-AAA to SX-ZZZ for powered airplanes; SX-H reserved for helicopters; SX-U reserved for ultralights; SX-101 to SX-999 for gliders	
Grenada	J3	J3-AAA to J3-ZZZ	
Guatemala	TG	TG-AAA to TG-ZZZ	
Guernsey	2	2-AAAA to 2-ZZZZ 2-AA to 2-ZZ	
Guinea	3X	3X-AAA to 3X-ZZZ	
Guinea-Bissau	J5	J5-AAA to J5-ZZZ	
Guyana	8R	8R-AAA to 8R-ZZZ	
Haiti	HH	HH-AAA to HH-ZZZ	
Honduras	HR	HR-AAA to HR-ZZZ	
Hong Kong	B-H	B-HAA to B-HZZ	
Hong Kong	B-K	B-KAA to B-KZZ	
Hong Kong	B-L	B-LAA to B-LZZ	
Hungary	HA	HA-AAA to HA-ZZZ; HA-1111 to HA-9999 (gliders, ultralights, and motor-gliders)	
Iceland	TF	TF-AAA to TF-ZZZ; TF-100 to TF-999 (microlights)	
India	VT	VT-AAA to VT-ZZZ	
Indonesia	PK	PK-AAA to PK-ZZZ; PK-S001 to PK-S999 (microlights)	
Iran	EP	EP-AAA to EP-ZZZ	
Iraq	YI	YI-AAA to YI-ZZZ	
Ireland	EI, EJ	EI-AAA to EI-ZZZ for normal allocation.; EJ-AAAA to EJ-ZZZZ for VIP or business aircraft.	
Isle of Man	M	M-AAAA to M-ZZZZ	
Israel	4X	4X-AAA to 4X-ZZZ	
Israel	4Z		
Italy	I	I-AAAA to I-ZZZZ; I-PDVA to I-PDVZ (test registrations of Costruzioni Aeronautiche Tecnam); I-EASA to I-EASZ (test registrations of various manufacturers including Pipistrel, Tecnam and Agusta Westland); I-0001 to I-Z999 (ultralights and advanced ultralights)	
Ivory Coast	TU	TU-AAA to TU-ZZZ; TU-VAA to TU-VZZ (military)	
Jamaica	6Y	6Y-AAA to 6Y-ZZZ	
Japan	JA	JA0001 to JA9999; JA001A to JA999Z; JA01AA to JA99ZZ; JA-AAAA to JA-ZZZZ; JAA001 to JAA999 (balloons)	
Japan	JR	JR0201 to JR6ZZZ (ultralight aviation, control surface control type); JR7001 to JR7ZZZ (ultralight aviation, weight transfer control type); JR8001 to JR9ZZZ (ultralight aviation, parachute type); JR9001 to JR9ZZZ (gyroplane); JR0001 to JR0200 (other homebuilt aircraft)	
Jordan	JY	JY-AAA to JY-ZZZ	
Jordan and Iraq	4YB	International operating agency: Arab Air Cargo	
Kazakhstan	UP	UP-AAA01 to UP-ZZZ99 (Suffix letters refer to aircraft type). Changed from UN to avoid confusion with the United Nations.	
Kenya	5Y	5Y-AAA to 5Y-ZZZ	
Kiribati	T3	T3-AAA to T3-ZZZ	
Kosovo	Z6 plus national emblem	Z6-AAA to Z6-ZZZ	
Kuwait	9K	9K-AAA to 9K-ZZZ	
Kyrgyzstan	EX	EX-100 to EX-999; EX-10000 to EX-99999	
Laos	RDPL	RDPL-10000 to RDPL-99999	
Latvia	YL	YL-AAA to YL-ZZZ	
Latvia	LV	LV-001 to LV-Z99 (balloons and gliders)	
Lebanon	OD	OD-AAA to OD-ZZZ	
Lesotho	7P	7P-AAA to 7P-ZZZ	
Liberia	A8	A8-AAA to A8-ZZZ. Previously EL was cancelled by the United Nations due to illegal use.	
Libya	5A	5A-AAA to 5A-ZZZ	
Liechtenstein	HB plus national emblem	HB-AAA to HB-ZZZ. Shares allocation with Switzerland.	
Lithuania	LY	LY-AAA to LY-ZZZ	
Luxembourg	LX	LX-AAA to LX-ZZZ; LX-BAA to LX-BZZ (balloons); LX-CAA to LX-CZZ (glider and motorglider); LX-HAA to LX-HZZ (helicopters); LX-XAA to LX-XZZ (ultralights)	
Macau	B-M	B-MAA to B-MZZ	
Madagascar	5R	5R-AAA to 5R-ZZZ	
Malawi	7Q	7Q-AAA to 7Q-ZZZ	
Malaysia	9M	9M-AAA to 9M-ZZZ; 9M-EAA to 9M-EZZ (amateur-built); 9M-UAA to 9M-UZZ (microlight)	
Maldives	8Q	8Q-AAA to 8Q-ZZZ	
Mali	TZ	TZ-AAA to TZ-ZZZ	
Malta	9H	9H-AAA to 9H-ZZZZZ; 9H-111 to 9H-99999	
Marshall Islands	V7	V7-0001 to V7-9999	
Martinique	F-O	F-OAAA to F-OZZZ for aircraft based outside of mainland France	
Mauritania	5T	5T-AAA to 5T-ZZZ	
Mauritius	3B	3B-AAA to 3B-ZZZ	
Mexico	XA plus national emblem	XA-AAA to XA-ZZZ (commercial)	
Mexico	XB plus national emblem	XB-AAA to XB-ZZZ (private)	
Mexico	XC plus national emblem	XC-AAA to XC-ZZZ (government)	
Micronesia	V6	V6-AAA to V6-ZZZ	
Moldova	ER	ER-AAA to ER-ZZZ; ER-10000 to ER-99999	
Monaco	3A-M	3A-MAA to 3A-MZZ	
Mongolia	JU	JU-1000 to JU-9999	
Montenegro	4O	4O-AAA to 4O-ZZZ	
Montserrat	VP-M	VP-MAA to VP-MZZ	
Morocco	CN	CN-AAA to CN-ZZZ; CNA-AA to CNA-ZZ (government and military)	
Mozambique	C9	C9-AAA to C9-ZZZ	
Myanmar	XY	XY-AAA to XY-ZZZ	
Myanmar	XZ	XZ-AAA to XZ-ZZZ (not used)	
Namibia	V5	V5-AAA to V5-ZZZ	
Nauru	C2	C2-AAA to C2-ZZZ	
Nepal	9N	9N-AAA to 9N-ZZZ (commercial aircraft); 9N-RAA to 9N-RZZ (government aircraft)	
Netherlands	PH	PH-AAA to PH-ZZZ; PH-1AA to PH-1ZZ (drones); PH-1A1 to PH-9Z9 (microlights); PH-100 to PH-9999 (gliders)	
Netherlands Antilles (currently used by Curaçao and Sint Maarten)	PJ	PJ-AAA to PJ-ZZZ	
New Caledonia	F-O	F-OAAA to F-OZZZ for aircraft based outside of mainland France	
New Zealand	ZK	ZK-AAA to ZK-ZZZ; ZK-AAA to ZK-BZZ (restored historical aircraft); ZK-FAA to ZK-FBZ (balloons); ZK-GAA to ZK-GAZ (restored historical aircraft); ZK-GBA to ZK-GZZ (gliders); ZK-HAA to ZK-HAZ (restored historical aircraft); ZK-HBA to ZK-IZZ (helicopters); ZK-RAA to ZK-RDZ (gyrocopters); The remainder for fixed-wing aircraft.	
New Zealand	ZL	ZL-AAA to ZL-ZZZ	
New Zealand	ZM	ZM-AAA to ZM-ZZZ	
Nicaragua	YN	YN-AAA to YN-ZZZ	
Niger	5U	5U-AAA to 5U-ZZZ	
Nigeria	5N	5N-AAA to 5N-ZZZ	
North Korea	P	P-500 to P-999	
North Macedonia	Z3	Z3-AAA to Z3-ZZZ; Z3-HAA to Z3-HZZ (helicopters); Z3-UA-001 to Z3-UA-999 (ultralight); Z3-OAA to Z3-OZZ (hot air balloons)	
Norway	LN	LN-AAA to LN-ZZZ; LN-CAA to LN-CZZ (balloons); LN-GAA to LN-GZZ (gliders); LN-OAA to LN-OZZ (helicopters); LN-YAA to LN-YZZ (sports aircraft)	
Oman	A4O	A4O-AA to A4O-ZZ; A4O-AAA to A4O-ZZZ	
Pakistan	AP	AP-AAA to AP-ZZZ	
Panama	HP	HP-1000AAA to HP-9999ZZZ. The three letters (AAA–ZZZ) stand for the ICAO code of the airline, such as CMP for Copa Airlines and PST for Air Panama.	
Papua New Guinea	P2	P2-AAA to P2-ZZZ	
Paraguay	ZP	ZP-AAA to ZP-ZZZ	
Peru	OB	OB-1000 to OB-9999; Previously OB-initial-number, e.g. OB-M-1114, OB-M-1245, OB-T-1274.	
Philippines	RP	RP-0001 to RP-9999 (government-owned aircraft); RP-C0001 to RP-C9999 (aircraft with complete registrations); RP-G0001 to RP-G9999 (gliders); RP-R0001 to RP-R9999 (limited registrations); RP-U001A to RP-U999Z (unmanned Aerial Vehicles); RP-X0001 to RP-X9999 (experimental certificate); RP-S0001 to RP-S9999 (non-type certificated aircraft)	
Poland	SP	SP-AAA to SP-ZZZ; SP-0*** (motor-gliders); SP-1*** to SP-3***, SP-8*** (gliders); SP-B** (balloons); SP-L** (reserved for LOT Polish Airlines); SP-S*** (ultralights); SP-X*** (autogyros); SP-Y** (experimental)	
Poland	SN	SN-00AA to SN-99ZZ (state-owned aircraft (public order services); Last two digits indicate type and owner); X - Helicopter, Y - Aeroplane, A - Other; A - Central Institutions**, G (H, D, U*) - Border Guard, P (N, K, W*) - Police, S (F) - Fire Dept**, T - Civil Protection**, R - Govt Rescue Service**, Z (C, E, B) Customs**, M, L - other government services**, Q - trial flights**; * will be used if primary letters are exhausted; ** currently unused/unseen	
Portugal	CR	CR-AAA to CR-ZZZ (aircraft registered in the overseas provinces, used until 1975)	
Portugal	CS	CS-AAA to CS-ZZZ; CS-BAA to CS-BZZ (balloons); CS-HAA to CS-HZZ (helicopters); CS-PAA to CS-PZZ (gliders); CS-TAA to CS-TZZ (airliners; used by most commercial airlines); CS-UAA to CS-UZZ (ultralight aircraft); CS-XAA to CS-XZZ (experimental)	
Qatar	A7	A7-AAA to A7-ZZZ; A7-AAA to A7-AZZ: (Qatar Airways, Airbus only); A7-BAA to A7-BZZ: (Qatar Airways, Boeing only); A7-HAA to A7-HZZ & A7-MAA to A7-MZZ (official use)	
Réunion	F-O	F-OAAA to F-OZZZ for aircraft based outside of mainland France	
Romania	YR	YR-AAA to YR-ZZZ; YR-1000 to YR-9999 (gliders and ultralights); YR-D0000 to YR-D9999 (UAVs, drones)	
Russia	RA	RA-00001 to RA-99999; FLA RF-00001 to FLA RF-99999 or ФЛА РФ-00001 to ФЛА РФ-99999 (private - no longer valid); RA-0001K to RA-9999K (ultralight - no longer valid); RA-0001G to RA-9999G (private - aircraft without type certificate); RA-0001A to RA-9999A (ultralight)	
Russia	RF	RF-00001 to RF-99999 (state-owned aircraft; first two digits indicate owner)	
Rwanda	9XR	9XR-AA to 9XR-ZZ	
Saint Helena/Ascension	VQ-H	VQ-HAA to VQ-HZZ	
Saint Kitts and Nevis	V4	V4-AAA to V4-ZZZ	
Saint Lucia	J6	J6-AAA to J6-ZZZ	
Saint Vincent and the Grenadines	J8	J8-AAA to J8-ZZZ	
Samoa	5W	5W-AAA to 5W-ZZZ	
San Marino	T7	T7-AAA to T7-ZZZZZ; T7-001 to T7-99999. (Note: Any combination of 3 to 5 letters and numbers permitted (except the letters "I" or "O" are not permitted when the suffix contains numbers).)	
São Tomé and Príncipe	S9	S9-AAA to S9-ZZZ	
Saudi Arabia	HZ	HZ-AAA to HZ-ZZZ; HZ-AA1 to HZ-ZZ99; HZ-AAA1 to HZ-ZZZ99; HZ-AAAA to HZ-ZZZZ	
Senegal	6V	6V-AAA to 6V-ZZZ	
Senegal	6W		
Serbia	YU	YU-AAA to YU-ZZZ; YU-0000 to YU-9999 (Gliders); YU-A000 to YU-Z999 (Ultralight).; YU-D0000 to YU-D9999 (Drone/Unmanned Aircraft).	
Seychelles	S7	S7-AAA to S7-ZZZ	
Sierra Leone	9L	9L-AAA to 9L-ZZZ	
Singapore	9V	9V-AAA to 9V-ZZZ	
Slovakia	OM	OM-AAA to OM-ZZZ; OM-AAAA to OM-ZZZZ (ultralight); OM-M000 to OM-M999 (microlights); OM-0000 to OM-9999 (gliders)	
Slovenia	S5	S5-AAA to S5-9999; S5-DAA to S5-DZZ (general); S5-HAA to S5-HZZ (helicopters); S5-JAA to S5-JZZ (gyrocopters); S5-KAA to S5-KZZ (motorgliders/sustainers); S5-OAA to S5-OZZ (hot air balloons); S5-PAA to S5-PZZ (ultralights); S5-MAA to S5-MZZ (amateur builds); S5-1000 to S5-1999 (vintage gliders); S5-3000 to S5-3999 (single-seater gliders); S5-7000 to S5-7999 (two-seater gliders)	
Solomon Islands	H4	H4-AAA to H4-ZZZ	
Somalia	6O	6O-AAA to 6O-ZZZ	
South Africa	ZS	ZS-AAA to ZS-ZZZ (type certified aircraft)	
South Africa	ZT	ZT-RAA to ZT-RZZ (type certified rotorcraft); ZT-TAA to ZT-TZZ (civil RPAS)	
South Africa	ZU	ZU-AAA to ZU-ZZZ (non-type certified aircraft)	
South Korea	HL	HL0000 to HL0599 (glider); HL0600 to HL0799 (airship); HL1000 to HL1799 (piston engine); HL2000 to HL2099 (piston engine); HL5100 to HL5499 (turboprop); HL6100 to HL6199 (piston engine helicopter); HL7100 to HL7199 (single turbojet); HL7200 to HL7299, HL7500 to HL7599, HL7700 to HL7799, HL8000 to HL8099, HL8200 to HL8399, HL8500 to HL8599, HL8700 to HL8799 (twin-jet aircraft); HL7300 to HL7399 (tri-jet aircraft); HL7400 to HL7499, HL7600 to HL7699, HL8400 to HL8499, HL8600 to HL8699 (quad-jet aircraft); HL9100 to HL9699 (turboshaft helicopter); HL-C000 to HL-C999 (ultralight)	
South Sudan	Z8	Z8-AAA to Z8-ZZZ	
Spain	EC plus national emblem	EC-AAA to EC-WZZ (civil Aircraft); EC-YAA to EC-ZZZ (homebuilt aircraft); EC-AA0 to EC-ZZ9 (ultralight); EC-001 to EC-999 (test and delivery)	
Spain	EM	EM-AAA to EM-ZZZ (military)	
Sri Lanka	4R	4R-AAA to 4R-ZZZ	
Sudan	ST	ST-AAA to ST-ZZZ	
Suriname	PZ	PZ-AAA to PZ-ZZZ; PZ-HAA to PZ-HZZ (helicopters); PZ-TAA to PZ-TZZ (commercial transport); PZ-UAA to PZ-UZZ (agriculture crop-dusters)	
Sweden	SE	SE-AAA to SE-ZZZ; SE-AAA to SE-CZZ (prop aircraft, general use); SE-DAA to SE-DZZ (jets); SE-EAA to SE-GZZ (prop aircraft, general use); SE-HAA to SE-HZZ (helicopters); SE-IAA to SE-IZZ (prop aircraft, general use); SE-JAA to SE-JZZ (helicopters); SE-KAA to SE-MZZ (prop aircraft, general use); SE-RAA to SE-RZZ (jets); SE-SAA to SE-UZZ (sailplanes and gliders); SE-VAA to SE-VZZ (ultralights); SE-XAA to SE-XZZ (homebuilts); SE-YAA to SE-YZZ (ultralights); SE-ZAA to SE-ZZZ (lighter than air); SE-A01 to SE-Z99 (test and delivery)	
Switzerland	HB plus national emblem	General pattern: HB-AAA to HB-ZZZ, with HB-1 to HB-9999 for Gliders and Motorgliders. The registration often denotes the aircraft type and maker. Some examples: HB-Axx two-engined aircraft from 5.7 to 15 tons, Aircraft over 15 tons due to shortage of Jxx.; HB-Bxx balloons; HB-Cxx single-engined Cessnas under 5.7 tons; HB-Dxx and HB-Kxx other single-engined aircraft under 5.7 tons; HB-Fxx Swiss-produced aircraft like PC-6 and PC-12; HB-Hxx Swiss-produced aircraft like AF-22 and AF-23 Bravo; HB-Ixx and HB-Jxx aircraft over 15 tons, including DC-3; HB-Nxx and HB-Pxx single-engined Pipers under 5.7 tons; HB-Vxx business jets under 15 tons; HB-Xxx helicopters; HB-Yxx experimental aircraft; HB-Zxx helicopters; Also used by Liechtenstein	
Syria	YK	YK-AAA to YK-ZZZ	
Taiwan	B	B-00000 to B-99999	
Tajikistan	EY	EY-10000 to EY-99999	
Tanzania	5H	5H-AAA to 5H-ZZZ	
Thailand	HS	HS-AAA to HS-ZZZ	
Thailand	U	U-A00 to U-Z99 (ultralight aircraft)	
Togo	5V	5V-AAA to 5V-ZZZ	
Tonga	A3	A3-AAA to A3-ZZZ	
Trinidad and Tobago	9Y	9Y-AAA to 9Y-ZZZ	
Tunisia	TS	TS-AAA to TS-ZZZ	
Turkey	TC	TC-AAA to TC-ZZZ; TC-BAA to TC-BZZ (hot air balloons); TC-HAA to TC-HZZ (helicopters); TC-PAA to TC-PZZ (gliders); TC-UAA to TC-UZZ (ultralights and microlights); TC-ZAA to TC-ZZZ (agricultural aircraft)	
Turkmenistan	EZ	EZ-A100 to EZ-Z999	
Turks and Caicos	VQ-T	VQ-TAA to VQ-TZZ	
Tuvalu	T2	T2-AAA to T2-ZZZ	
Uganda	5X	5X-AAA to 5X-ZZZ	
Ukraine	UR	UR-AAA to UR-ZZZ; UR10000 to UR99999; UR-AAAA to UR-ZZZZ (private aircraft)	
United Arab Emirates	A6	A6-AAA to A6-ZZZ; A6-GY1 to A6-GY9 (reserved for SkyDive Dubai / Gyrocopters); A6-SD1 to A6-SD9 (reserved for SkyDive Dubai)	
United Arab Emirates	DU	DU-001 to DU-999 (Dubai Police aircraft)	
United Kingdom	G	G-AAAA to G-ZZZZ; G-1-1 to G-99-99 (UK aircraft test serials for test & delivery purposes)	
United States	N	N1 to N99999; N1A to N9999Z; N1AA to N999ZZ; Prior to 1948 the letter 'N' was usually suffixed by one of the six following; 'C' for Commercial, 'L' for Limited, 'R' for Restricted, or 'X' for Experimental. The registration must not contain the letters "I" or "O" to avoid confusion with 1 or 0.	
United States	FA	FA3####### (UAVs under 55 lb (25 kg))	
Uruguay	CX	CX-AAA to CX-ZZZ	
Uzbekistan	UK	UK10000 to UK99999	
Vanuatu	YJ	YJ-AA1 to YJ-ZZ99	
Venezuela	YV	YV1000 to YV9999; YV100T to YV999T; YV100E to YV999E (training); YVO100 to YVO999 (official use)	
Vietnam	VN	VN-1000 to VN-9999 (largely helicopters); VN-A100 to VN-A999 (jetliners); VN-B100 to VN-B999 (turboprops); VN-C100 to VN-C999 (internal combustion engine)	
Yemen	7O	7O-AAA to 7O-ZZZ	
Zambia	9J	9J-AAA to 9J-ZZZ	
Zimbabwe	Z	Z-AAA to Z-ZZZ	

=== Retired allocations ===
Some post-1928 prefixes have been retired due to various reasons, including decolonization and the dissolution of sovereign states.

Country/territory or region	Registration prefix	Adopted	Retired	Replaced with	Presentation and notes
Aden	VR-A	1939	1939		British colonial allocation
Algeria	F-O (Note: Colonial allocation F-O was shared between Algeria, Cameroon, Chad, Congo, Dahomey/Benin, Gabon, Guinea, Cote D'Ivoire, Madagascar, Mali, Mauritania, Niger, Senegal, Tunisia, Ubangi-Shari, and Upper Volta.)	1929	1962	7T	French colonial allocation
Angola	CR-L	1929	1975	D2	Portuguese colonial allocation
Argentina	R (Note: The prefix R was shared between Argentina and Panama. Registrations from the two countries were differentiated by the number of digits, with Panama using two digits while Argentina used three.)	1929	1932	LV	
Austria	A	1929	1939	OE	
Bahamas	VP-B	1929	1975	C6	British colonial allocation
Barbados	VQ-B	1952	1968	8P	British colonial allocation
Basutoland	VQ-ZA, VQ-ZD	1929	1967	7P	British colonial allocation
Bechuanaland	VQ-ZE, VQ-ZH	1929	1968	A2	British protectorate allocation
Bermuda	VR-B	1931		VP-B	British colonial allocation
Bosnia and Herzegovina	T9			E7	
Brunei	VR-U	1929		V8	British colonial allocation
Burundi	BR	1962	1965	9U	
Cambodia	F-KH	1945	1954	KW	French colonial allocation
Cambodia	KW	1954		XU	
Cameroon	F-O	1929	1960	TJ	French colonial allocation
Cameroon	VR-N	1929	1958	TJ, 5N	British colonial allocation
Canada	CF	1929	1974	C	
Cape Verde	CR-C	1929		D4	Portuguese colonial allocation
Cayman Islands	VR-C	1968		VP-C	British colonial allocation
Ceylon	VP-C	1929	1948	CY	British colonial allocation
Ceylon	CY	1948	1954	4R	
Chad	F-O	1929	1960	TT	French colonial allocation
China	XT	1929	1949	B	
Colombia	C	1929	1946	HK	C was reallocated to Canada in 1974
Congo	F-O	1929	1960	TN	French colonial allocation
Congo	OO-C	1929	1960	9O	Belgian colonial allocation
Cote D'Ivoire	F-O	1929	1960	TU	French colonial allocation
Cyprus	VQ-C	1952	1960	5B	British colonial allocation
Czechoslovakia	OK	1929	1993		Following dissolution, the allocation of OK went to the Czech Republic, while Slovakia was allocated the new prefix OM
Dahomey/Benin	F-O	1929	1960	TY	French colonial allocation
Danzig	YM	1929	1939	D	
Dutch East Indies	JZ	1945			Dutch colonial allocation
East Germany	DDR	1945	1956	DM	
East Germany	DM	1956		D	Replaced with D after German reunification
Estonia	ES	1929	1939/1940	СССР	Allocation restored following the dissolution of the Soviet Union
Fiji	VQ-F	1929	1971	DQ	British colonial allocation
Finland	K-S	1919	1931	OH	Prefix carried over from pre-1928 allocation
France	FC	1940	1944	F	Free France
Gabon	F-O	1929	1960	TR	French colonial allocation
Gambia	VP-X	1929	1945		British colonial/protectorate allocation
Gold Coast	VP-A	1929	1957	9G	British colonial allocation
Gibraltar	VR-G	1929	1939	G	British colonial allocation
Grenada	VQ-G	1962		J3	British colonial allocation
Guatemala	LG	1936	1948	TG	
Guiana	VP-G	1929	1967	8R	British colonial allocation
Guinea	F-O	1929	1958	3X	French colonial allocation
Guinea-Bissau/Guinea	CR-G	1929	1975	J5	Portuguese colonial allocation
Honduras	XH	1929	1960	HR	
British Honduras	VP-H	1947		V3	British colonial allocation
Hong Kong	VR-H	1929		B-H	British colonial allocation
India	CR-I	1929	1961	VT	Portuguese colonial allocation
Indochina	F-VN	1929	1954	XV	French colonial allocation
Iran	RV	1929	1944	EP	
Jamaica	VP-J	1930	1964	6Y	British colonial allocation
Japan	J	1929	1945	JA, JR	Japanese aviation was temporarily banned following the end of WWII
Jersey	ZJ	2015	2022		ZJ-AAA to ZJ-ZZZ, excluding combinations only containing the letters I, O, or S. Only four aircraft were registered with this prefix.
Johor	VR-J	1929	1963	9M	British protectorate allocation
Kampuchea	XU	1954	1979		
Katanga	KA	1961	1963	9O	Unofficial separatist allocation
Kenya	VP-K	1929	1963	5Y	British colonial allocation
Kuwait	K	1967	1968	9K	
Laos	F-L	1945	1954	XW	French colonial allocation
Laos	XW	1954	1975	RDPL	
Latvia	YL	1929	1939/1940	СССР	Allocation restored following the dissolution of the Soviet Union
Lebanon	LR	1944	1954	OD	
Leeward and Windward Islands	VP-L	1929		V2	British colonial allocation
Liberia	LI	1929	1952	EL	
Liberia	EL	1952	c. 2002	A8	
Lithuania	LY	1929	1939/1940	СССР	Allocation restored following the dissolution of the Soviet Union
Lithuania	RY	1929	1939	СССР	
Luxembourg	UL	1929	1939	LX	
Macau	CR-M	1929		CS-M	Portuguese colonial allocation
Macau	CS-M		1999	B-M	Portuguese colonial allocation
Madagascar	F-O	1929	1960	5R	French colonial allocation
Malaya	VR-R	1929	1963	9M	British colonial allocation
Mali	F-O	1929	1960	TZ	French colonial allocation
Malta	VP-M	1929	1968	9H	British colonial allocation
Mauritania	F-O	1929	1960	5T	French colonial allocation
Mauritius	VQ-M	1929	1968	3B	British colonial allocation
Monaco	CZ	1929	1949	MC	
Monaco	MC	1949	1959	3A	
Morocco	F-D	1929	1952	CN	French colonial allocation
Mozambique	CR-A	1929	1975	C9	Portuguese colonial allocation
Mozambique	CR-B	1971	1975	C9	Portuguese colonial allocation
New Zealand	ZM	1929	1939	ZK, ZL, ZM	Allocation later restored
Newfoundland	VO	1929	1939	CF	British colonial allocation
Nicaragua	YN	1929	1936	AN	Allocation later restored
Nicaragua	AN	1939		YN	
Niger	F-O	1929	1960	5U	French colonial allocation
North Borneo	VR-O	1929	1963	9M	British colonial/protectorate allocation
Northern Rhodesia	VP-R	1929	1953	VP-Y	British protectorate allocation
Nyasaland	VP-N	1929	1953	VP-Y	British colonial allocation
Nyasaland	VP-Y	1953	1964	7Q, 9J	British colonial allocation
Palestine	VQ-P	1930	1948	4X	British mandatory allocation. Following the end of the British Mandate, the successor state of Israel was allocated the prefix 4X.
Panama	R	1929	1943	RX	
Panama	RX	1943	1952	HP	
Peru	OA	1929	1950	OB	
Philippines	PI	1941	1975	RP	
Rhodesia	VP-Y	1929	1964	7Q, 9J	British colonial allocation
Rhodesia	VP-W	1971		Z	British colonial allocation
Romania	CV	1929	1936	YR	
Ruanda-Urundi	OO-C				Belgian colonial allocation
Saar Territory	TS	1930	1931	EZ	Unofficial British/French mandatory allocation
Saar Territory	EZ	1929	1933	SL	British/French mandatory allocation
Saar Territory	SL	1947	1959	D	French protectorate allocation
Saint Kitts and Nevis	VP-LK, VP-LL			V4	British colonial allocation
Saint Lucia	VQ-L	1965		J6	British colonial allocation
Saint Vincent and the Grenadines	VP-V	1959		J8	British colonial allocation
Sarawak	VR-W	1929			British colonial allocation
Saudi Arabia	UH	1945		HZ	
Senegal	F-O	1929	1960	6V	French colonial allocation
Seychelles	VQ-S	1929	1977	S7	British colonial allocation
Sierra Leone	VR-L	1929	1961	9L	British protectorate allocation
Singapore	VR-S	1929	1965	9V	British colonial allocation
Solomon Islands	VP-P	1929		H4	British colonial allocation
Somalia/Somaliland	VP-S	1929	1960	6OS	British colonial allocation
Somalia/Somaliland	6OS	1960	1969	6O	
South Vietnam	XV	1959	1975		
Southern Rhodesia	VP-Y	1929	1964	7Q, 9J	British colonial allocation
Soviet Union	СССР	1929		Multiple (Note: Following the dissolution of the Soviet Union, the individual successor states each adopted their own aircraft registration prefix.)	Written in Cyrillic script, equivalent to "SSSR" in Latin script
Spain	M	1929	1933	EC	
Sudan	SN	1929	1953	ST	British/Egyptian colonial allocation
Swaziland	VQ-ZI	1929	1975	3D	British colonial allocation
Switzerland	CH	1929	1936	HB	
Tonga	VQ-F	1929	1971	DQ	British protectorate allocation
Transjordan	TJ	1946	1954	JY	British protectorate allocation
Trinidad and Tobago	VP-T	1931	1965	9Y	British colonial allocation
Tunisia	F-O	1929	1956	TS	French colonial allocation
Ubangi-Shari	F-O	1929	1960	TL	French colonial allocation
Uganda	VP-U	1929	1962	5X	British protectorate allocation
Upper Volta	F-O	1929	1960	XT	French colonial allocation
Vietnam	3W	1954	1959	XV	
Weihaiwei	VP-W	1929	1939		British colonial allocation
Yemen	YE	1955	1969	4W	
Yemen	4W	1969		7O	
Yugoslavia	UN	1929	1935	YU	
Zaire	9O	1960	1966	9Q	
Zanzibar	VP-Z	1929	1964	5H	British protectorate allocation

== Pre-1928 allocations ==
Note: in the suffix pattern, n represents a number, x represents a letter

Country or region	Registration prefix	Suffix pattern	1913 radio call letters
Abyssinia	A-B (Note: Adopted at the ICAN meeting of 6 October 1925.)	A-Bxxx	
Afghanistan	Y-A (Note: Adopted at the ICAN meeting of 25 April 1927.)	Y-Axxx	
Albania	B-A (Note: Adopted at the ICAN meeting of 26 June 1923.)	B-Axxx	
Argentina	R-A (Note: Adopted at the ICAN meeting of 14 October 1924.)	R-Axxx	LIA to LRZ
Australia	G-AU	G-AUxx	VHA to VKZ
Austria-Hungary and Bosnia-Herzegovina			HAA to HFZ, OGA to OMZ and UNA to UZZ
Belgium	O-B (Note: Adopted at the International Commission for Air Navigation (ICAN) meeting of 13 October 1919.)	O-Bxxx	ONA to OTZ
Bolivia	C-B	C-Bxxx	none
Brazil	P-B	P-Bxxx	SNA to STZ
Bulgaria	B-B	B-Bxxx	LXA to LZZ
Canada	G-C	G-Cxxx, except G-CYxx	VAA to VGZ (Newfoundland: VOA to VOZ)
Canada	G-CY (government aircraft, including military)	G-CYxx	VAA to VGZ (Newfoundland: VOA to VOZ)
Chile	B-C (Note: Adopted at the ICAN meeting of 6 April 1925.)	B-Cxxx	COA to CPZ
China	X-C	X-Cxxx	none
Colombia	C	C-n to C-nnn	none
Costa Rica	TI-	TI-xxx	
Cuba	C-C	C-Cxxx	none
Czechoslovakia	L-B	L-Bxxx	
Danzig
Danzig	Y-M	Y-Mxxx	Not applicable
Danzig	Dz	Dz-nnn	
Denmark	T-D (Note: Adopted at the ICAN meeting of 28 February 1923.)	T-Dxxx	OUA to OZZ
Dominica	Z-D	Z-Dxxx	
Dominican Republic	HI	HIxxx	
Ecuador	E-E (Note: The ICAN meeting of 28 February 1923 amended Ecuador's marks to E-U, Haiti's to H-E, and Uruguay's marks to C-M. They were restored to their original marks at the following meeting on 26 June.)	E-Exxx	
Egypt			SUA to SUZ
El Salvador	Y-S (Note: Adopted at the ICAN meeting of 3 November 1926.)	Y-Sxxx	
Estonia	E-A (Note: Adopted at the ICAN meeting of 3 March 1924.)	E-Axxx	
Finland	K-S	K-Sxxx	
France	F	F-xxxx	F and UAA to UMZ
Germany	D	D-nnnn	A, D and KAA to KCZ
Greece	S-X	S-Xxxx	SVA to SZZ
Guatemala	L-G	L-Gxxx	
Haiti	H-H	H-Hxxx	
Hejaz	A-H	A-Hxxx	
Honduras	X-H	X-Hxxx	
Hungary
Hungary	H-H	H-Hxxx	
Hungary	H-O (Note: Amended at the ICAN meeting of 26 June 1923.)	H-Oxxx	
India	G-I	G-Ixxx	VTA to VWZ
Italy	I	I-xxxx	I
Japan	J	J-xxxx	J
Latvia	B-L (Note: Adopted at the ICAN meeting of 25 October 1922.)	B-Lxxx	
Liberia	L-L	L-Lxxx	
Lithuania	Z-L	Z-Lxxx	
Luxembourg	L-U	L-Uxxx	
Mexico			XAA to XCZ
Monaco	M-M	M-Mxxx	CQA to CQZ
Monaco	M-O	M-Oxxx	CQA to CQZ
Morocco			CNA to CNZ
Netherlands	H-N (Note: Adopted at the ICAN meeting of 13 July 1922.)	H-Nxxx	PAA to PMZ
New Zealand	G-NZ	G-NZxx	VLA to VMZ
Nicaragua	A-N	A-Nxxx	
Norway			LAA to LHZ
Panama	S-P	S-Pxxx	
Persia	P-I	P-Ixxx	
Peru	O-P	O-Pxxx	
Poland	P-P	P-Pxxx	
Portugal	C-P	C-Pxxx	CRA to CTZ
Romania	C-R	C-Rxxx	CVA to CVZ
Russia	R-R	R-Rxxx, RR-xxx	R
Serbia-Croatia-Slovenia	X-S	X-Sxxx	
Siam	H-S	H-Sxxx	HGA to HHZ
South Africa	G-UA	G-UAxx	VNA to VNZ
Spain	M	M-xxxx	EAA to EGZ
Sweden	S-A	S-Axxx	SAA to SMZ
Switzerland	HB	HB-nnn	
United Kingdom	K	K-nnn	B, G and M (British colonies not autonomous: VPA to VSZ)
United Kingdom	G-E	G-EAxx, G-EBxx, G-EDCA	B, G and M (British colonies not autonomous: VPA to VSZ)
United Kingdom	G-F (lighter than air craft)	G-FAAx	B, G and M (British colonies not autonomous: VPA to VSZ)
United Kingdom	G-G (gliders)	G-GAAx	B, G and M (British colonies not autonomous: VPA to VSZ)
United States	N	N-xxxx	KDA to KZZ, N and W
Uruguay	C-U	C-Uxxx	CWA to CWZ
