= Constitution of Guernsey =

Principles of political governance of the Bailiwick of Guernsey

The Bailiwick of Guernsey has an unwritten constitution.
