= List of windmills in Guernsey =

The Bailiwick of Guernsey has had a number of windmills over the centuries. They were mostly corn mills, and about half of those built survive in one form or another.

== Guernsey ==
- Cote des Vardes

Located in Montville Road, St Peter Port, used to grind stone, has been converted into a three-storey property.

- Delancey Windmill

This mill was standing in 1847.

- L'Hyvreuse Windmill

The site of the L'Hyvreuse Windmill is now occupied by the Victoria Tower, built in 1848.

- Le Hechet Windmill

Photographed in the 19th century, Le Hechet was located in St Saviour, presumably off Rue du Hechet.

- Le Moulin des Monts

Le Moulin des Monts, St Sampson's, was destroyed by lightning in 1660. Its site is now occupied by the De Saumarez Memorial in Delancey Park.

- Moulin Mont Saint, St Saviour

A windmill to grind stone was established in St Saviour in 1833. It was restored in 2022.

- Moulin Huet, St Martin

Moulin Huet is a tower mill. Possibly named after Walter Huet, Governor of Guernsey in 1372. It was derelict and capless by 1949 when photographed by Donald Muggeridge. The mill had lost its sails by 1926, even though the cap and sail cross remained. The tower is located at the top of Old Mill Road and Les Camps du Moulin, St Martin.

- Ozannes Windmill

Ozannes Mill, in Ruette Braye was in existence in 1897.

- Petit Bot Windmill

The windmill, located at the top of Petit Bot Valley was photographed in good condition before it was totally destroyed. Its exact location has not been found. It could be at the top of the St Martin or Forest valleys.

- Sausmarez Windmill, St. Martin

The converted mill still stands in Steam Mill Lane, it houses a jewellery business which also operates a store from the converted St. Peter's mill in Jersey.

- Vale Windmill

A windmill was standing on this site in 1847. Vale Windmill is a five-storey tower mill that was built in 1850. Photographs show it to have had four patent sails mounted in a canister, and an ogee cap similar in shape to those found in Suffolk, winded by a fantail. The mill had a stage at first floor level. It was converted into an artillery observation post by the Germans during the Second World War. This work entailed a three-storey extension being built on the mill tower, making it 21 metres (68 ft 11 in) high overall. The windmill featured on a 2p postage due stamp issued by the Guernsey post office in 1982.

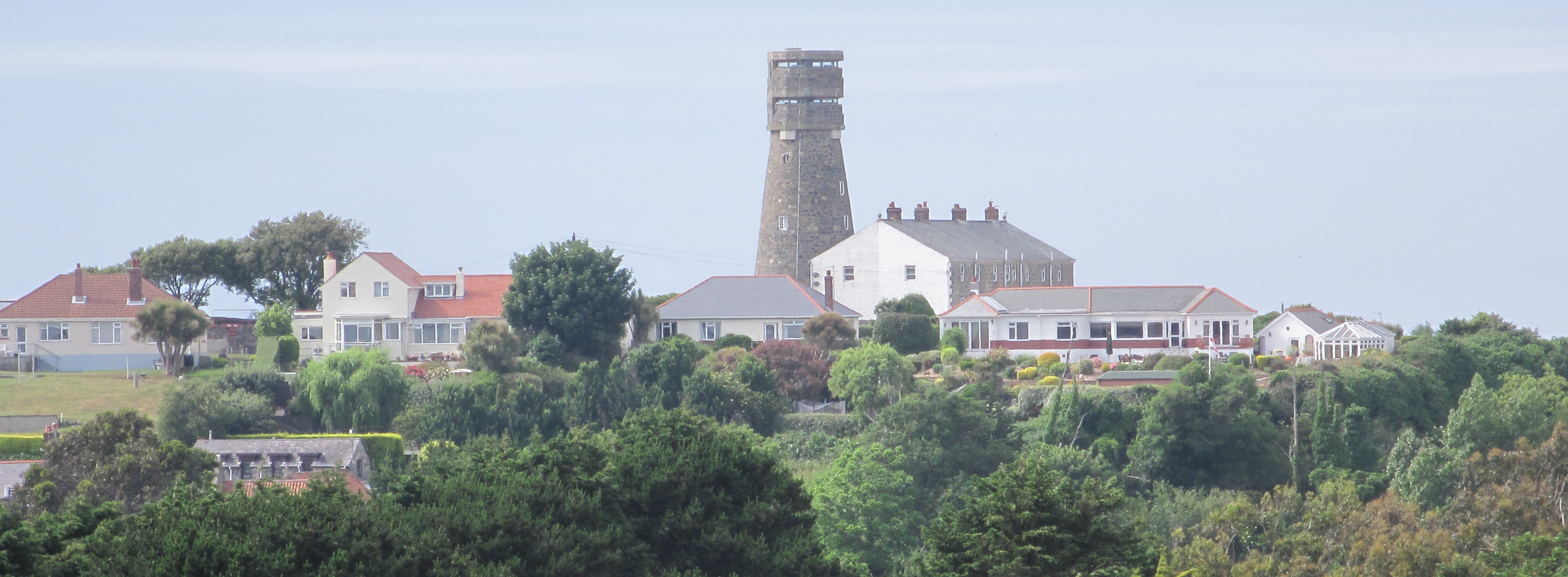
Vale Mill

== Alderney ==
There is a record of a windmill owned by the King before 1242 on The Blaye.

Alderney had a windmill built in 1560.

== Sark ==
- Sark Windmill

Sark Windmill was built in 1571 at the seigneur's expense. It is situated on the highest point on Sark (114 metres or 374 feet above sea level), called Le Moulin after the windmill. It is a three-storey tower mill with an ogee cap. In the early 19th century the mill was burned by Sark tenants protesting against the seigneurial system there, but it was later refitted with new machinery and heightened. It was working by wind until 1917 although the sails were removed during World War I. It was used as an observation tower during the German occupation. The mill had four double patent sails, and was winded by a fantail. The mill featured on the 1971 and 1977 2p coins issued by Guernsey.

- Little Sark Windmill

Little Sark Windmill was a tower mill. The tower remains today, mostly covered in ivy.

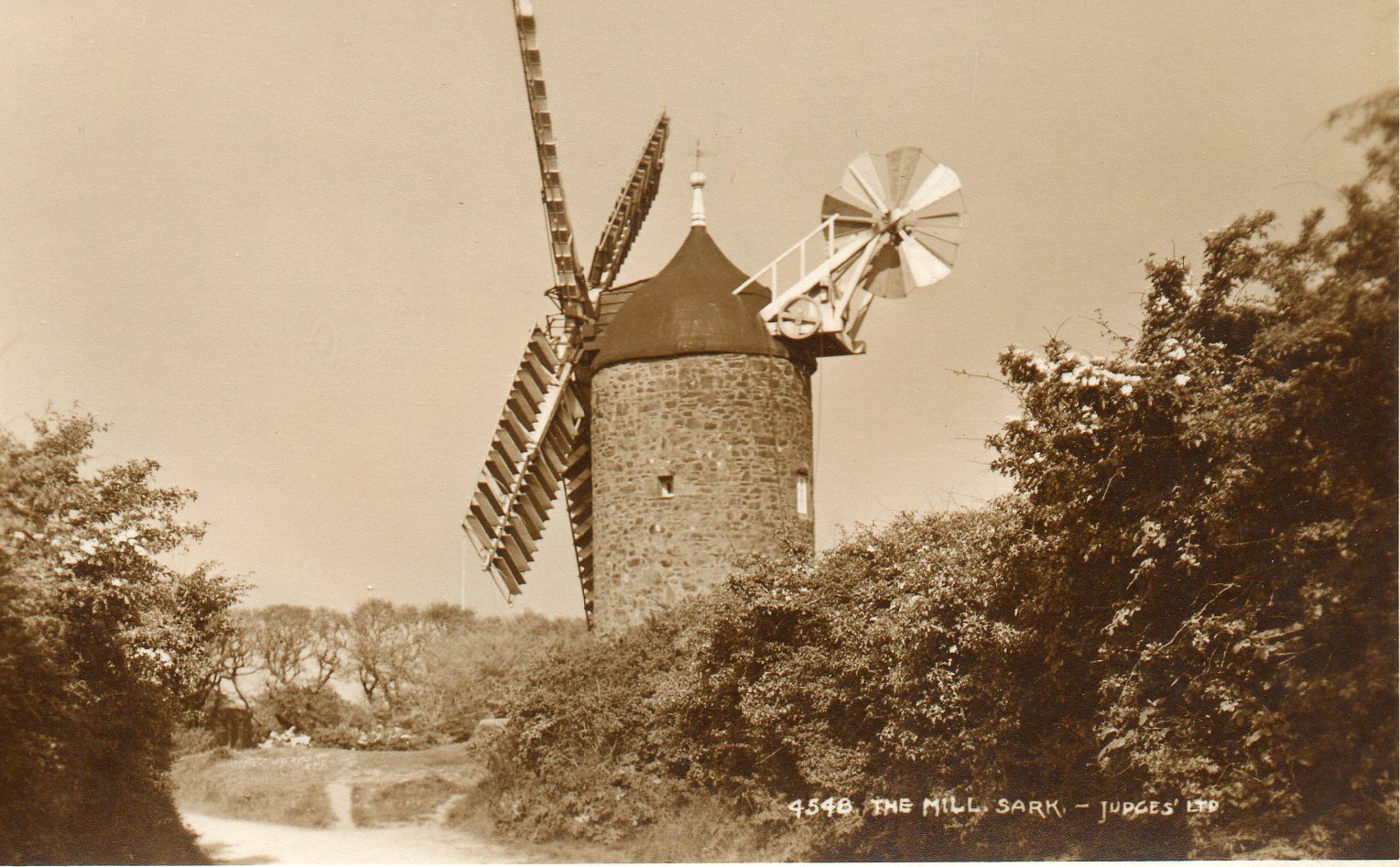
Sark windmill c1905

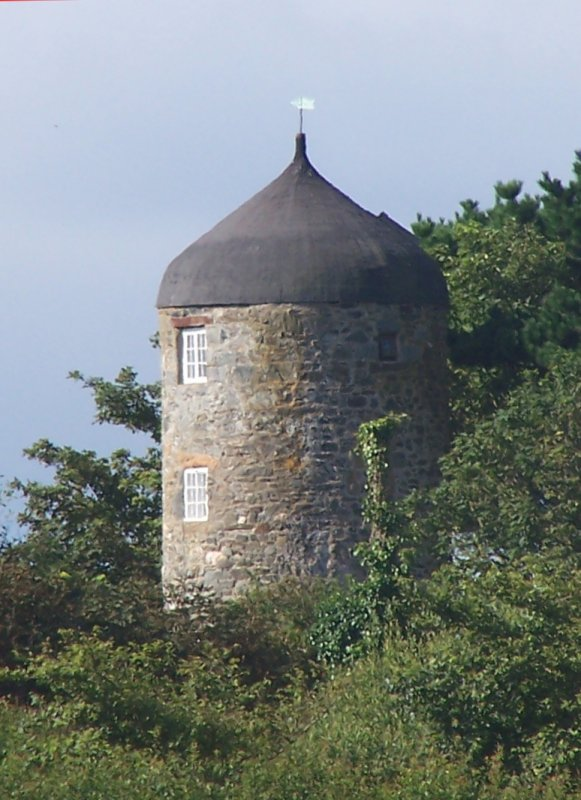
Sark windmill, 2007

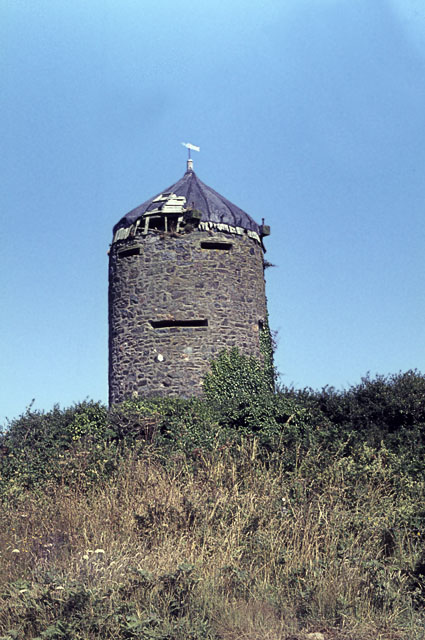
Little Sark windmill, 1964
