= Fishing in Guernsey =

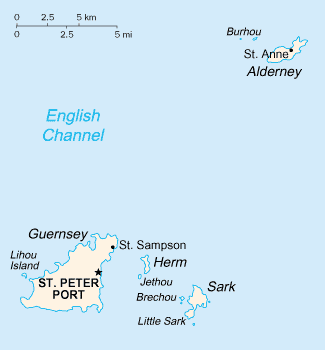
Map of the Bailiwick of Guernsey

Fishing within the Bailiwick of Guernsey is common place. The bailiwick is made up of several islands in the Channel Islands, namely (Herm, Sark, Alderney and Guernsey).

Guernsey's territorial waters limit is 3 miles. For commercial fishing the bailiwick has a Fisheries Management Agreement enabling the licence and management of commercial fishing up to 12 nautical miles.

Fishing in Guernsey offers a large range of species available to catch which will involve many different styles of fishing to adopt and learn to become successful.

Most common fish caught off the bailiwick shores are:

- Bass
- Bream
- Garfish (longnose)
- Mackerel
- Pollack
- Wrasse

Many more fish are in abundance around the shores.

== Guernsey records ==
- Fishing Guernsey-records

Fish	Guernsey record (lb-oz-dr)	Year	Location	British record (lb-oz-dr)
Anglerfish	38-0-0	05-Jul-1974	The sea	1967 - 68-2-0
Bass	18-6-5	23-Oct-1999	The sea	2012 - 19-12-0
Boops boops	1-15-4	1978	The sea	Same as Guernsey record
Bream, black	6-8-6	31-Oct-2001	Creux Harbour, Sark	Same as Guernsey record
Bream, Couchs sea	3-4-7	2008	The sea	Same as Guernsey record
Bream, gilthead	8-2-2	04-Sep-1983	The sea	1995 - 10-5-8
Bream, red	4-7-0	19-Sep-1979	Alderney Lighthouse	Same as Guernsey record
Brill	7-7-8	07-Nov-1980	The sea	2018 - 8-3-0
Cod	29-0-0	28-Dec-1981	Lancresse Bay	1966 - 44-8-0
Conger	108-0-0	19-Aug-1991	West of Guernsey	1995 - 133-0-0
Dab	1-9-1	09-Aug-1981	Fort Doyle	1936 - 2-9-8
Dogfish, lesser spotted	2-13-11	01-Oct-2004	St Peter Port Breakwater	1988 - 4-15-3
Eel, common	3-15-4	11-Sep-1987	Albert Pier	1978 - 11-2-0
Flounder	5-6-13	23-Dec-1998	St Peter Port Breakwater	1994 - 5-7-0
Garfish	2-11-11	01-Dec-2002	Crown Pier	2017 - 3-9-8
Gurnard, red	2-4-6	06-Aug-2000	L'Ancresse	1976 - 2-10-11
Gurnard, tub	5-9-1	26-Jun-2005	Chouet	1976 - 12-3-0
John Dory	3-3-4	18-Aug-1967	St Peter Port	vacant
Mackerel	2-13-0	03-Aug-1977	White Rock	1982 - 5-11-14
Mullet, golden grey	3-0-4	11-Oct-1991	Cats Bay, Alderney	2005 - 3-8-8
Mullet, red	3-15-0	01-Oct-1996	Longy, Alderney	Same as Guernsey record
Mullet, thick lipped	11-14-6	24-Mar-1985	Longy, Alderney	1979 - 14-2-12
Mullet, thin lipped	2-3-3	13-Oct-2002	QEII Marina	1991 - 7-0-0
Plaice	8-3-4	08-Dec-1985	Bordeaux	1989 - 8-6-14
Pollack	16-1-6	21-Dec-1998	Alderney Lighthouse	1986 - 18-4-0
Pouting	4-9-0	07-Jul-1991	Pembroke	Same as Guernsey record
Ray, blonde	32-8-0	07-Dec-1986	Mannez, Alderney	Same as Guernsey record
Ray, marbled electric	12-5-14	27-Oct-1995	Alderney Breakwater	1990 - 13-15-11
Ray, small eyed	14-7-10	04-Dec-1993	Corblets, Alderney	1991 - 15-0-8
Ray, spotted	4-11-8	04-Jul-1982	Herm Island	1980 - 8-5-0
Ray, undulate	19-0-12	05-Dec-1996	Alderney, South Coast	1983 - 21-4-0
Rockling, shore	1-0-5	Jun-2013		1992 - 1-9-12
Rockling, three bearded	2-11-4	2014		2001 - 3-12-14
Salmon, coho	1-8-1	21-Jun-1977	Petit Port	Same as Guernsey record
Sea trout	4-11-2	17-Apr-1999	Salerie	1992 - 28-5-4
Shad, twaite	1-10-8	06-Dec-1994	Belgrave Bay	1978 - 2-12-0
Smooth hound	6-5-2	29-Jan-2005	St Peter Port Breakwater	2000 - 20-3-0
Smooth hound, starry	14-9-2	02-Feb-2006	Alderney Breakwater	1972 - 23-2-0
Sole, common	6-8-10	13-Sep-1991	Alderney South Coast	Same as Guernsey record
Tadpole fish	0-15-8	01-Jun-1995	St Peter Port Breakwater	1990 - 1-5-12
Triggerfish	3-10-12	22-Aug-2004	Hog's Back, Sark	1995 - 5-14-8
Turbot	22-3-0	25-Aug-1968	St Sampsons Breakwater	1973 - 28-8-0
Whiting	2-3-12	25-Jan-1992	St Peter Port Breakwater	1984 - 4-0-7
Wrasse, ballan	8-10-13	27-Mar-1993	St Peter Port Breakwater	1998 - 9-1-0
Wrasse, cuckoo	1-12-9	17-Oct-1999	Rosaire, Herm	Same as Guernsey record

Mini species	Guernsey record (lb-oz-dr)	Year	Location	British record (lb-oz-dr)
Bream, axillary	0-8-5	1995	Guernsey wreck	Same as Guernsey record
Goby, giant	0-9-4	1994	Beaucette Marina, Vale	Same as Guernsey record
Smelt, sand	0-2-9	1975	New Jetty, St Peter Port	Same as Guernsey record
Topknot, common	0-13-8	1998	Grande Rocques	Same as Guernsey record

== Locations ==
Caught record fish locations

Guernsey

St Peter Port Break Water

St Peter Port Breakwater - Location of eight bailiwick records (angler fish, Couch's sea bream, lesser spotted dogfish, flounder, smooth hound, tadpole fish, whiting and ballan wrasse). As the records show, the St Peter Port breakwater is good fishing for many species. Located just passed Castle Cornet in the town of St Peter Port. The breakwater is a light house on the end of a pier. It offers easy access and safe fishing although it can be very busy due its advantages.

Pembroke - L'Ancresse - Chouet All three locations are in very close proximity to each other and boast five bailiwick records (bass, cod, red gurnard, tub gurnard and pouting). Located on the north west coast of Guernsey, The Lancresse area offers sandy beaches with easy access for rock or beach fishing.

White Rock - QEII Marina - Albert Pier - Crown Pier - Salerie (The White Rock no longer exists due to land reclamation.) These sites held four records (eel common, sea trout, garfish, mackrel and thin lipped mullet). All four locations are situated in St Peter Port town. They are the piers and that separate the three marina's, Albert, Crown and QEII, all four of which are also car park areas.

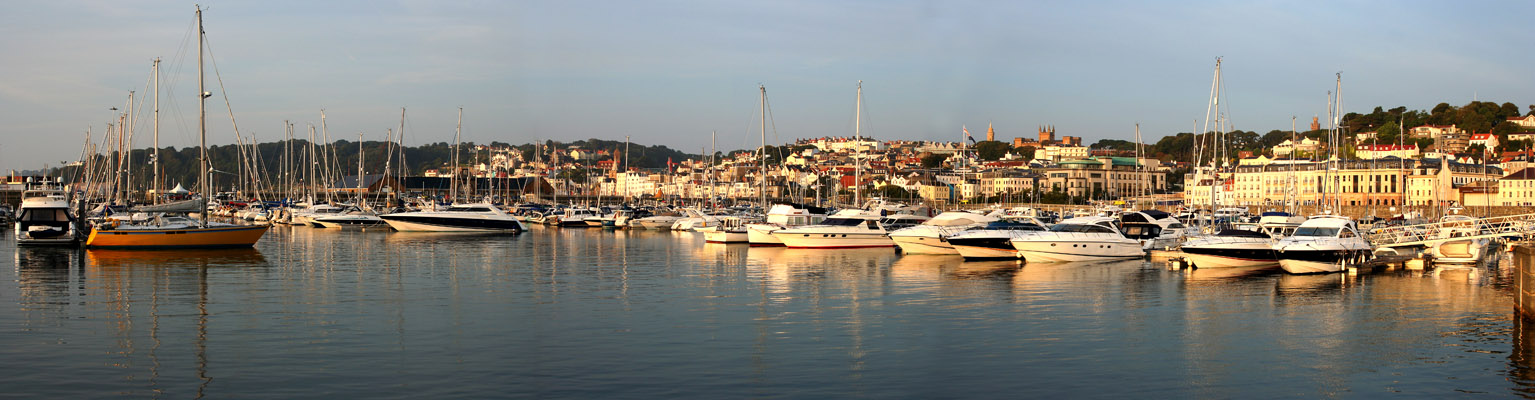
QEII Marina (Guernsey) - Taken from the Salerie

Alderney Breakwater Location of three bailiwick records (starry smooth hound, three bearded rockling, marbled electric ray).
