= 2010 Alderney general election =

General elections were held in Alderney on 27 November 2010 in accordance with the rules governing elections in Alderney. Five of the ten seats in the States were up for election. There were 12 candidates.

Roy Burke, Chief Executive of the States of Alderney said "It has been most exciting, to see democracy in action was remarkable. I have a great team working around me who have organised everything very professionally which meant that all went very smoothly".

== Results ==
Candidate	Votes	%	Notes
Matt Birmingham	654	73.4	Elected
Ian Tugby	502	56.4	Elected
Paul Arditti	501	56.2	Elected
Raymond Berry	450	50.5	Elected
Tony Llewellyn	388	43.5	Elected
Norma Williams	365	41.0	
Ray Gaudion	323	36.2	
Victor Levine	170	19.1	
Lin Maurice	165	18.5	
Arthur Wheeler	147	16.5	
Ken Hampton	131	14.7	
Lois Fitzgerald	43	4.8	
Invalid/blank votes	-	-	
Total	890	-	
Registered voters/turnout	1,269	70.1	
Source: 2010 results

== 2013 by-election ==
A by-election was held on 11 May 2013 to replace Tony Llewellyn, who had resigned in March 2013. Six candidates stood for election, which was won by Steve Roberts.

Candidate	Votes	%	Notes
Steve Roberts	305	42.2	Elected
Les Stewart	276	38.2	
Lin Maurice	72	10.0	
Peter Raphael	36	5.0	
Ken Hampton	23	3.2	
Colin Murfitt	10	1.3	
Total	722	100	
Valid votes	732	100	
Invalid/blank votes	9	0.0	
Total	741	100	
Registered voters/turnout		~65	
Source: Government of Alderney

== See also ==
- States of Alderney Member
