= 2006 Alderney general election =

General elections to the States were held in Alderney on 25 November 2006 in accordance with the rules governing elections in Alderney. Five of the ten seats in the States were up for election. All five elected members were independents.

== Results ==
Candidate	Votes	%
Colin Williams	654	20.89
Ian Tugby	627	20.03
Richard Willmott	461	14.72
Liz Bennett	424	13.54
Richard Cox	352	11.24
Jeremy Sanders	319	10.19
John Postlethwaite	294	9.39
Total	3,131	100.00
Registered voters/turnout		65%
