= List of artists from Guernsey =

This is a selected list of notable artists from, or with links to, Guernsey.

- Peter Monamy (1681–1749), English marine painter
- Paul Jacob Naftel (1817–1891), artist
- Douglas Cowper (1817–1839), painter
- Denys Corbet (1826–1909), poet and painter
- Mary Eily de Putron (1914–1982), Irish and Guernsey stained glass artist and archaeologist
- Frederick Moynihan (1843–1910), sculptor
- Peter Le Vasseur (born 1938), artist
- Chris Foss (born 1946), British artist and science fiction illustrator
