= La Fregate Hotel (Guernsey) =

La Fregate
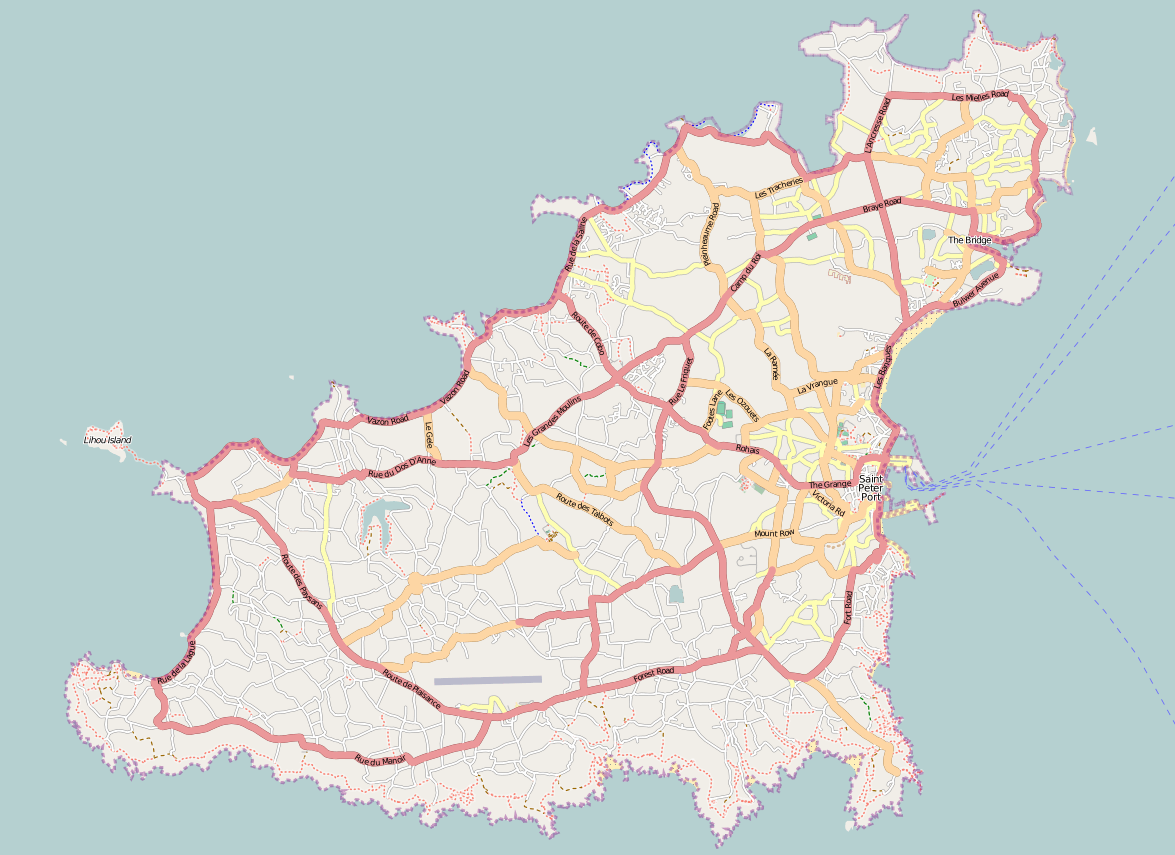
- Location in Guernsey

General information
- Location: Les Cotils, Saint Peter Port, Guernsey
- Coordinates: 49°27′39″N 2°32′8″W

Website
- www.lafregatehotel.com

La Fregate is a hotel in Saint Peter Port, Guernsey, set on a hillside overlooking the Saint Peter Port Harbour surrounded by a terraced garden. The original building is an 18th-century granite manor, but an additional wing has been added.

== Restaurant ==
The hotel has an attached restaurant serving meals made primarily with local seafood and produce.
