= External relations of Guernsey =

The Bailiwick of Guernsey is a British Crown dependency in the English Channel off the coast of Normandy. As a bailiwick, Guernsey embraces not only all ten parishes on the island of Guernsey, but also the islands of Alderney and Sark – each with their own parliament – and the smaller islands of Herm, Jethou and Lihou. Although its defence is the responsibility of the United Kingdom, the Bailiwick is not part of the United Kingdom, but, as its description suggests, a possession of the Crown. Consequently, though it lies within the Common Travel Area, it was never part of the European Union.

The Policy and Resources Committee is responsible for external relations.

== Consulates ==
Several European countries have honorary consuls and hold informal honorary consulates in the island. The Honorary Consulate of the French Republic is based at Victor Hugo's former residence at Hauteville House.

== Independence debate ==
While Guernsey has complete autonomy over internal affairs and certain external matters, the topic of complete independence from the British Crown has been discussed widely and frequently, with ideas ranging from Guernsey obtaining independence as a Commonwealth realm to the bailiwicks of Guernsey and Jersey uniting and forming an independent federal state within the Commonwealth, whereby both bailiwicks would retain their independence with regard to domestic affairs, but internationally the islands would be regarded as one state.

== Relations with other Crown dependencies ==
A Guernsey–Jersey double taxation agreement was first signed in 1956.

In 1998 Guernsey and Jersey electricity companies formed the Channel Islands Electricity Grid to operate and manage the submarine cables between Europe and the Channel Islands.

Guernsey has formed part of the British–Irish Council since it was formed in 1999, as have Jersey and the Isle of Man. Meetings take place twice a year; in 2004, 2010, 2014 and 2018 the meetings have taken place in Guernsey. Its stated aim is to "promote the harmonious and mutually beneficial development of the totality of relationships among the peoples of these islands".

In September 2010 a Channel Islands office was set up in Brussels jointly by the two Bailiwicks to develop the Channel Islands' influence with the EU, to advise the Channel Islands' governments on European matters, and to promote economic links with the EU.

On 24 January 2013 Jersey signed double taxation agreements with Guernsey (updating the existing agreement) and with the Isle of Man. This was the first time all three Crown dependencies had established such mutual agreements; they also included provision for exchange of tax information equivalent to TIEAs.

A dispute about fishing within Guernsey's 12 mile limit surfaced again in 2015.

The three Crown dependencies, while independent, share a relatively similar position with respect to the United Kingdom and with international bodies such as the EU or the OECD. As a result, the three work together on areas of mutual interest. For example, in 2000, the three states cooperated on development of common policies for offshore banking. In 2003, they developed a joint approach to certain EU activities around tax information. The heads of government within the Crown dependencies, including the Isle of Man, Guernsey, Alderney, Sark, and Jersey, meet at an annual inter-island summit to discuss matters of common concern, such as financial regulation and relations with the UK.

== Relations with the United Kingdom ==
The relationship of the Crown with Guernsey has been set out in numerous Charters over the centuries.

Guernsey is not represented in any UK parliament. The UK cannot legislate on behalf of Guernsey without obtaining prior consent.

A Guernsey–UK double taxation arrangement was signed in 1952.

Guernsey has formed part of the British–Irish Council since it was formed in 1999, as has England & Wales. Scotland and Northern Ireland have each also formed part of the British–Irish Council since 1999. Meetings take place twice a year; in 2004, 2010, 2014 and 2018 the meetings have taken place in Guernsey. Its stated aim is to "promote the harmonious and mutually beneficial development of the totality of relationships among the peoples of these islands".

The Deputy Chief Minister of Guernsey attended the UK Liberal Democrats conference in 2012 to communicate the message that "Guernsey and the Channel Islands are good neighbours to the UK". The Chief Minister of Guernsey, accompanied by the Commerce and Employment Minister, has been announced to attend the UK Conservative Party conference 2012.

There are close working relations between the island and the UK Police and Border Agency.

== Relations with Europe ==
Guernsey has entered into Tax Information Exchange Agreements with most countries within Europe.

=== European Union ===
Guernsey was neither a separate Member State nor an Associate Member of the European Union. Protocol No. 3 of the Treaty of Accession of the United Kingdom placed the Channel Islands and the Isle of Man within the Common Customs territory of the Community and the Common External Tariff of the European Economic Community. The authorities in Guernsey have to treat natural and legal persons of the European Union equally.

Until 2021, people born in the Channel Islands are British citizens and hence European citizens, they were not entitled to take advantage of the freedom of movement of people or services unless they are directly connected (through birth, descent from parent or grandparent, or five years' continuous residence in the UK).

In 2011, Guernsey working with Jersey had set up a Channel Islands Brussels Office whose aims are to strengthen the Islands' voice in Brussels.

Brexit has affected the relationship between the Bailiwick and the European Union. As from January 2021 the following changes have occurred:

- A new agreement concerning fishing in Guernsey territorial waters and the landing of catches in France will generally allow boats traditionally fishing in Guernsey waters to be given a licence by Guernsey, to enable them to continue to do so. Landing a catch in France is limited to boats registered with NEAFC landing at specific ports with prior permission and completed documentation.
- Guernsey registered vehicles may need a green card to prove insurance is valid and a GBG sticker.
- Guernsey driving licence holders may need one, or more, International Driving Permit's (IDP) (A 1968 IDP, a 1949 IDP or a 1926 IDP.
- Passport must be valid for at least 6 months
- Have a return ticket and funds to support stay in EU.
- Right to stay limited to 90 days in any 180 day period without a visa.
- Visa needed for work, business travel or study.
- Meat and milk products cannot be taken into the EU.
- Plants and plant products cannot be taken into the EU without a permit.

=== France ===
Fishing disputes have been frequent events over the years. In 2011 a peace deal was made. From 2021, following Brexit, Guernsey will licence all fishing boats, with non-Guernsey boats being limited to the 6 nm to 12 nm waters area.

In 2013 long term agreements with Électricité de France (EdF) were signed to supply low carbon electricity for the Channel Islands Electricity Grid.

On 22 January 2015, an agreement of cooperation was signed by Guernsey and Jersey with La Manche and Lower Normandy. The purpose of the agreement is to develop institutional partnerships and strengthen exchanges in the areas of economic development, tourism, education and culture between Lower Normandy, La Manche, the Government of Jersey and the States of Guernsey.

=== Republic of Ireland ===
Guernsey has formed part of the British–Irish Council since it was formed in 1999, as does Ireland. Meetings take place twice a year, in 2004, 2010, 2014 and 2018 the meetings have taken place in Guernsey. Its stated aim is to "promote the harmonious and mutually beneficial development of the totality of relationships among the peoples of these islands".

Guernsey's Deputy Chief Minister and Jersey's Assistant Chief Minister travelled to Dublin in September 2012 as a first step in a more coordinated approach to international relations. The purpose of the visit was to meet Ireland's Minister for European Affairs ahead of Ireland's assumption of the European Union presidency in 2013 for mutual discussions.

== Relations with the Commonwealth ==
=== Commonwealth of Nations ===
The States of Guernsey have made calls for a more integrated relationship with the Commonwealth of Nations, including more direct representation and enhanced participation in Commonwealth organisations and meetings, including Commonwealth Heads of Government Meetings, however with no right to vote in the Ministerial or Heads of Government meetings.

=== Commonwealth Parliamentary Association ===
Both Alderney and Guernsey are members of the Commonwealth Parliamentary Association.

=== Commonwealth Games ===
The Bailiwick of Guernsey which includes Alderney, Sark, Herm and the other smaller islands is a member of the Commonwealth Games Federation and has attended every games event since the inauguration in 1970.

== Relations with the business community ==
In 2011 Guernsey, which had previously been unrated, was awarded a AAA credit rating by Standard & Poor.

The Guernsey Vetting Bureau was established to utilise the UK Disclosure and Barring Service (DBS) for local employers and other organisations.

In December 2013 The International Stock Exchange (TISE) was officially recognised by both the UK HMRC and the Australian Securities Exchange ASX and in March 2015, the Exchange became an Affiliate Member of the World Federation of Exchanges WFE.

== Tax agreements ==
Guernsey has entered into a number of:

- Double tax agreements (DTA)
- Tax Information Exchange Agreements (TIEA)

Guernsey has also signed:

- EU Savings Tax Directive
- OECD Base erosion and profit shifting Agreement (BEPS)

== Twinning and affiliations ==
- Guernsey is twinned with (Germany) Biberach an der Riß
- Vale parish was twinned with the Normandy port of (France) Barneville-Carteret in 1987.
- Guernsey was affiliated with No. 201 Squadron RAF until the unit was disbanded in 2010.
- Guernsey has an affiliated warship, HMS Daring

== See also ==
United Kingdom–Crown Dependencies Customs Union
