= 2012 Alderney general election =

General elections were held in Alderney on 17 November 2012 in accordance with the rules governing elections in Alderney. Five of the ten seats in the States were up for election. There were 12 candidates.

== Results ==
Candidate	Votes	%	Notes
Louis Jean	613	74.9	Elected
Neil Harvey	532	65.0	Elected
Francis Simonet	440	53.8	Elected
Robert McDowall	319	39.0	Elected
Christopher Rowley	309	37.8	Elected
Boyd Kelly	254	31.0	
Ken Hampton	253	30.9	
Lin Maurice	221	27.0	
Bill Walden	195	23.8	
Helen Martin	109	13.3	
Martin Hunt	49	6.0	
Caroline Ely	48	5.9	
Invalid/blank votes	5	-	
Total	818	-	
Registered voters/turnout	1,209	73	

== See also ==
- States of Alderney Member
