= List of newspapers in Guernsey =

This article is a list of newspapers in Guernsey.

- Guernsey Press and Star
- The Quarry – Independent online news outlet covering Guernsey. (thequarry.media)

== Defunct newspapers ==
- La Gazette de Guernesey (1791–1936)
- The Star (1813–1951)
- The Comet (1828–1897)
- Le Bailliage (1889–1902)
- The Guernsey Evening Press (1897–1951)
- Deutsche Guernsey-Zeitung (1942–1945) – produced for German occupying troops
