= Guernsey lily =

Guernsey lily may refer to two species of flowering plants of the genus Nerine:

- Nerine bowdenii
- Nerine sarniensis

The color of the flowers of both species is variable, but Nerine bowdenii often has pink flowers, while Nerine sarniensis often has red flowers. It originated in South Africa.
