= 2003 Alderney referendum =

A non-binding referendum on allowing the direct election of the Alderney representatives of the States of Guernsey was held in Alderney in September and October 2003. However, the validity of the procedure was disputed. The proposal was approved by 70% of those who answered the questionnaire.

== Background ==
The two Alderney representatives in the States of Guernsey are chosen by the States of Alderney. The Procedures and Constitution Committee of the States of Guernsey sought to consult Alderney residents on whether this should be changed to allow for their direct election by voters. The referendum was opposed by the President of the Alderney States, Norman Browse, who claimed the Committee had "exceeded its mandate".

== Results ==
Choice	Votes	%
For	330	70.06
Against	141	29.94
Invalid/blank votes	13	–
Total	484	100
Registered voters/turnout	1,249	38.75
Source: Direct Democracy
