= 2-REG aircraft registration =

The Guernsey Aircraft Registry, also known as 2-REG, is a British register administered with regulatory oversight provided by Guernsey's Director of Civil Aviation. It licenses aircraft and permits them to use an Aircraft registration prefixed with 2-.

Since 1947, in accordance with the Convention on International Civil Aviation, all aircraft must be registered with a national aviation authority. The UK as a signatory to the 1947 Chicago Convention and bearing responsibility for the Crown Dependencies, which included the Bailiwick of Guernsey gave authority in 2013 for Guernsey to create a civil aviation register in accordance with Guernsey legislation, to be supervised by Guernsey's Director of Civil Aviation. This later became the Director of Civil Aviation for the Channel Islands.

== History ==
Established on 9 December 2013 following changes to legislation in Guernsey in 2012, 2-REG is owned by the States of Guernsey and registers private as well as commercial aircraft in accordance with international standards of the International Civil Aviation Organization (ICAO), reflecting the standards of the US, Europe and other major aviation jurisdictions.

In 2016 the Registry was opened to commercial aircraft and further changes in legislation permitted the issuing of Air operator's certificates.

Available to worldwide owners of aircraft when the Maximum Take-Off Mass (MTOM) is 5,700 kg or above and to owners of helicopters and lighter weight aircraft when owned by Channel Island Residents, or the aircraft is maintained in Guernsey, aircraft do not need to be based in Guernsey, or to ever visit Guernsey.

Unlike most registries, air worthiness Type certificates are available in a choice of formats suitable for various major jurisdictions and a Guernsey aircraft Charges Register exists for use by aircraft owners and finance companies.

== Usage of Register ==
As of August 2022 over 800 aircraft had been registered on the Register since its establishment in 2013. 283 Aircraft being currently registered, 174 being in the over 5,700 kg category. Commercial aircraft registered include Airbus, Boeing, Bombardier, Embraer and Gulfstream, with major aircraft lessors using the services offered by registering off-lease aircraft.

== See also ==
- United Kingdom aircraft registration
- Aircraft registration
- Airworthiness certificate
- Type certificate
