= Guernsey Gâche =

Regional bread of Guernsey

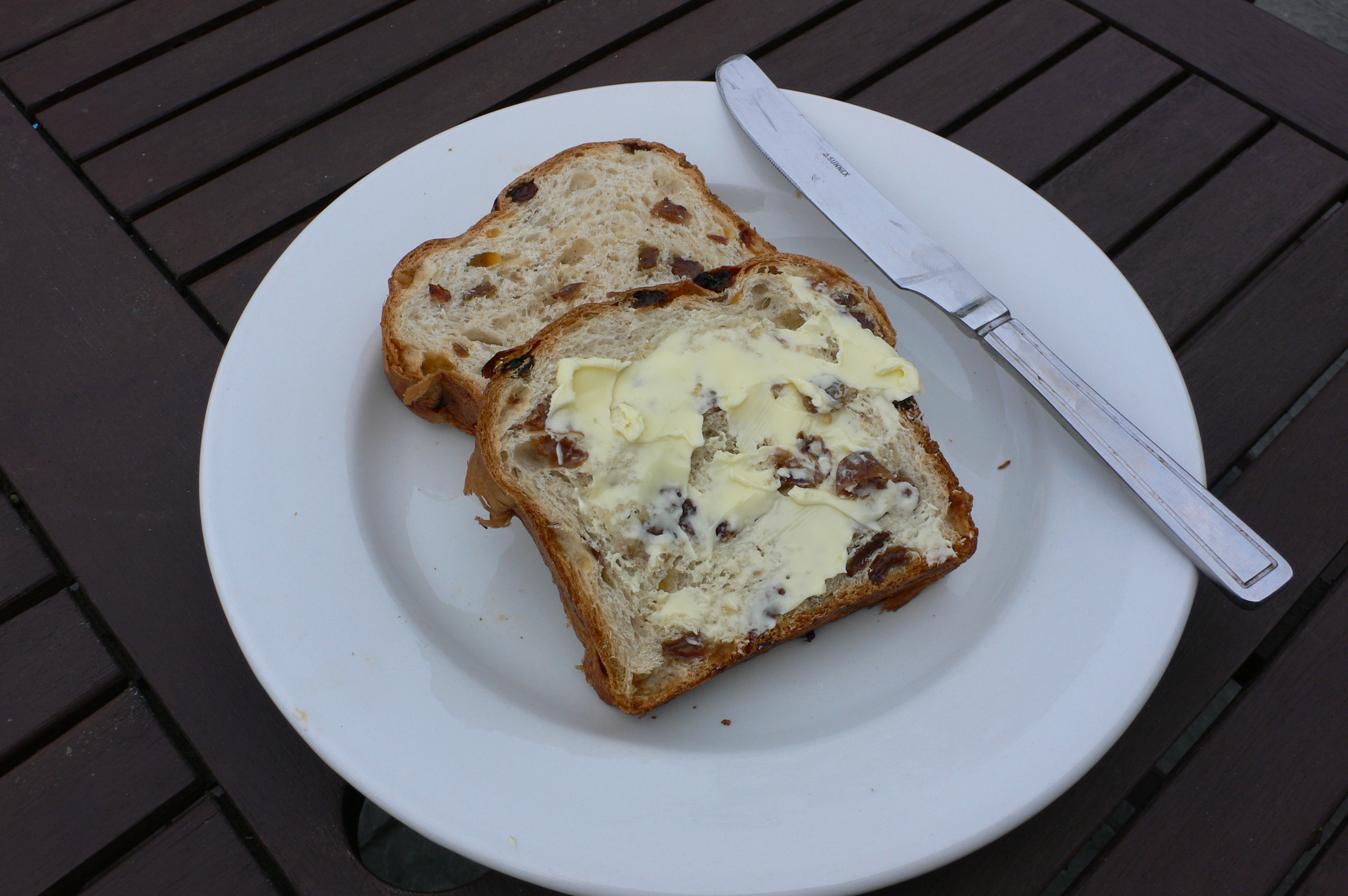
- Type: Sweet bread
- Place of origin: Guernsey
- Main ingredients: Raisins, sultanas, butter, mixed peel

Guernsey Gâche (gâche) is a dish of the Channel Island of Guernsey. It is a special bread made with raisins, sultanas, butter and mixed peel. In Guernésiais, gâche means cake.
