= Languages of the Bailiwick of Guernsey =

Languages of Guernsey
- Official: English, Guernésiais, French
- Vernacular: Channel Island English
- Minority: Sercquiais
- Immigrant: Portuguese
- Signed: British Sign Language
- Keyboard layout: British QWERTY

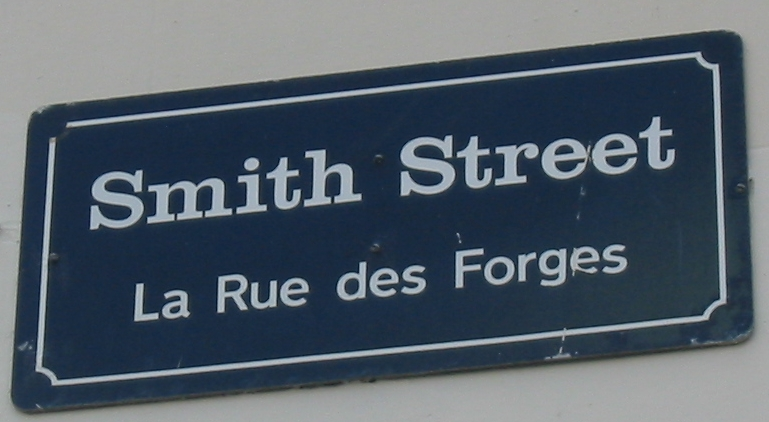
Many street names in St. Peter Port are in English and French

The linguistic situation of the Bailiwick of Guernsey is quite similar to that of Jersey, the other Bailiwick in the Channel Islands. English is the official language, French is used for administration, there are several varieties of Norman language used by a minority of the population, and Portuguese is spoken by some foreigners in the workforce.

== English ==
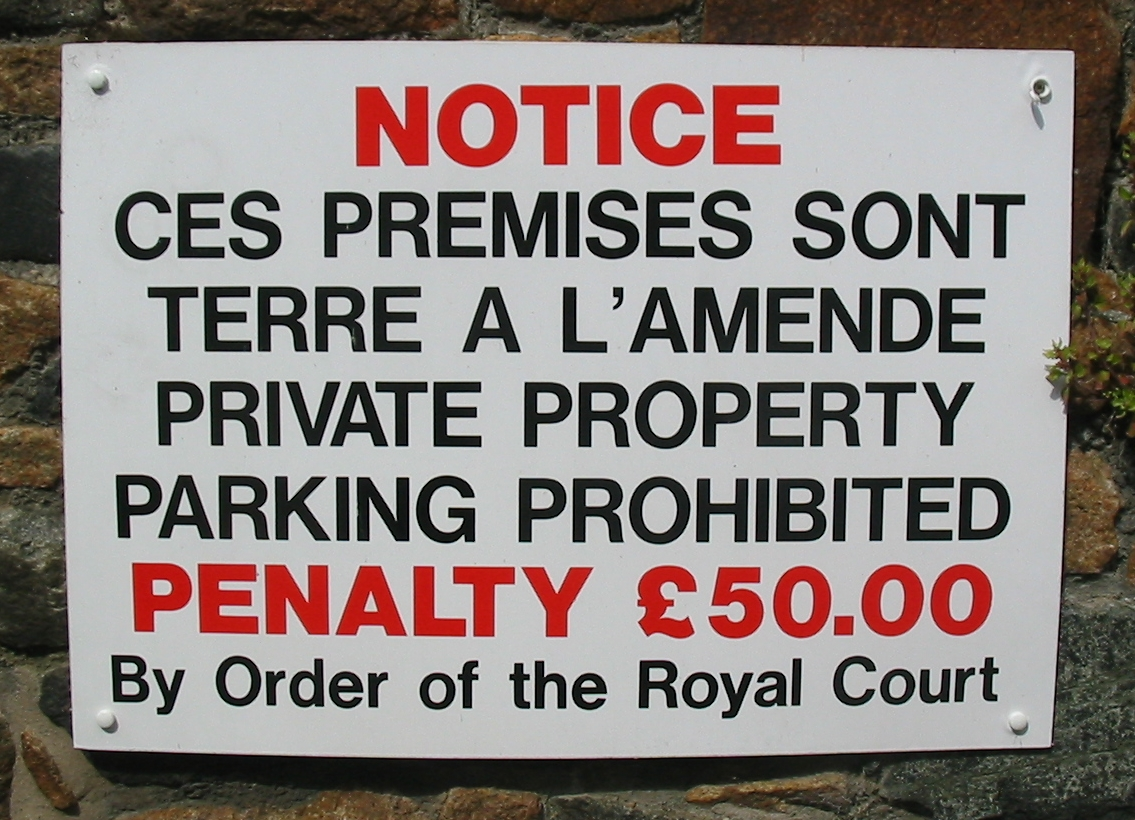
Sign showing French as an administrative language

English is one of the official languages and a dominant language in the Islands. Its status is mainly a product of the last century, and some 200 years ago, very few people in the Channel Islands spoke that language. Most papers, signage, and other such official materials are printed and distributed in English. There is also a dialect of Channel Island English that contains some Guernésiais.

== French ==
Until 1948, French was the official language of Guernsey. Today, it is still the language used in administration. It is still spoken by many as a second language; but it is little used as a common language. It differs from the historical indigenous Norman dialects of the islands.

Because of their location, the islands' main source of non-UK tourism tends to be French speaking.

== Norman ==
Within historical times, Norman dialects could be found throughout the islands, and were spoken by the majority. Many of the names and terms have been gallicised into standard French, or Law Norman.

=== Dgèrnésiais ===
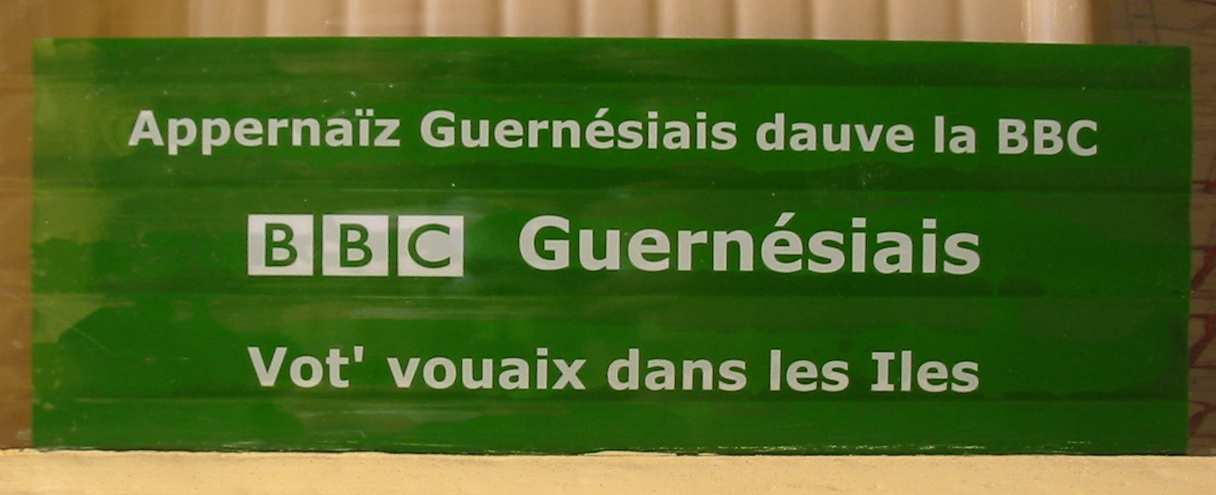
Guernsey language lessons are available through BBC Radio Guernsey

Guernésiais (Norman: Dgèrnésiais) is the traditional language of Guernsey. It is a variety of Norman, similar to the dialects of Norman spoken in mainland Normandy and also to the Anglo-Norman used, after the 1066 invasion, in England. There is some mutual intelligibility with Jèrriais, the Norman dialect spoken in Jersey. It is mainly spoken by older people living in rural parts of the island. Some 1,327 citizens of Guernsey speak the language today, or 2% of the population. It is not used as readily in Guernsey as Jèrriais in Jersey: only five minutes a week of news are delivered in the language on BBC Radio Guernsey. Fourteen percent of the population claim some understanding. It is called patois by some and believed by some to be a dialect of French.

=== Sercquiais ===
Sercquiais is the dialect of Jèrriais spoken by a minority of people in Sark, the original inhabitants of which were settlers from Jersey. It is now all but extinct, spoken by some 15 people.

=== Auregnais ===
The Norman language of Alderney, Auregnais, is now extinct. It is today mostly preserved in local toponyms.

=== Other ===
The island of Herm appears to have spoken Norman in the recent past, but there are no records of when it died out. Other islands such as Brecqhou, Jethou, les Casquets and Burhou were too small to support real communities.

== Sign language ==
The Deaf community on Guernsey use British Sign Language.

== Portuguese ==
Although there are fewer Portuguese people in Guernsey than in Jersey, they still form a small part of the population, roughly 2% of the population speak Portuguese.
