= Islam in Guernsey =

Islam has a slight, but growing presence in the Channel Island of Guernsey, a British Crown dependency. There is a local place of worship in St Peter Port and halal food is increasing easier to obtain from local supermarkets with halal dining options as well. The Guernsey Islamic Charitable Trust and the Guernsey Muslim Initiative are local organisations/groups supporting the local Muslim community.

In 2025, Munazza Malik was elected the first Muslim deputy of Guernsey.
