= List of banks in Guernsey =

List of banks registered on the island of Guernsey, based on list of licensed banking institutions from the Guernsey Financial Services Commission

- ABN Amro (Guernsey) Limited
- Bank J. Safra Sarasin Limited, Guernsey Branch
- Bank Julius Baer & Co. Ltd, Guernsey Branch
- Bank of Cyprus (Channel Islands)
- Banque cantonale vaudoise, Guernsey Branch
- Barclays Bank PLC, Guernsey Branch
- Barclays Private Clients International Limited, Guernsey Branch
- BNP Paribas (Suisse) SA, Guernsey Branch
- BNP Paribas Securities Services Custody Bank Limited, Guernsey Branch
- Butterfield Bank (Guernsey) Limited
- Credit Suisse (Channel Islands) Limited
- Credit Suisse A.G., Guernsey Branch
- Deutsche Bank International Limited – Guernsey Branch
- EFG Private Bank (Channel Islands) Limited
- HSBC Bank Plc, Guernsey Branch
- HSBC Private Bank (C.I.) Limited
- HSBC Private Bank (Suisse) S.A., Guernsey Branch
- Investec Bank (Channel Islands) Limited
- Kleinwort Benson (Channel Islands) Limited
- Lloyds Bank International Limited – Guernsey Branch
- Northern Trust (Guernsey) Limited
- Rothschild Bank (CI) Limited
- Rothschild Bank International Limited
- Royal Bank of Canada (Channel Islands) Limited
- Royal Bank of Scotland International Limited, Guernsey Branch
- Schroders (C.I.) Limited
- SG Hambros Bank (Channel Islands) Limited – Guernsey Branch
- Skipton Guernsey

== See also ==
- List of banks in Europe
