= ISO 3166-2:GG =

Entry for Guernsey in ISO 3166-2

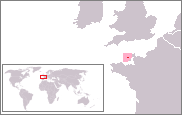
Location of Guernsey

ISO 3166-2:GG is the entry for Guernsey in ISO 3166-2, part of the ISO 3166 standard published by the International Organization for Standardization (ISO), which defines codes for the names of the principal subdivisions (e.g., provinces or states) of all countries coded in ISO 3166-1.

Currently no ISO 3166-2 codes are defined in the entry for Guernsey.

Guernsey, a Crown dependency of the United Kingdom, is officially assigned the ISO 3166-1 alpha-2 code GG since 2006. Previously it was assigned the ISO 3166-2 code GB-GSY under the entry for the United Kingdom.

== Changes ==
The following changes to the entry have been announced in newsletters by the ISO 3166/MA since the first publication of ISO 3166-2 in 1998:

Newsletter	Date issued	Description of change in newsletter
Newsletter I-8	2007-04-17	Addition of a new entry (in accordance with ISO 3166-1 Newsletter V-11)

== See also ==
- Subdivisions of Guernsey
