= Le Moulin =

Highest point on Sark

- Location within Channel Islands

Highest point
- Elevation: 114 m (374 ft)
- Prominence: 114 m (374 ft)
- Coordinates: 49°25′52″N 2°21′44″W

Naming
- English translation: the mill
- Language of name: French

Geography
- Location: Sark, Guernsey

Le Moulin is the highest point in Sark and is also the highest point of the Bailiwick of Guernsey, a British Crown Dependency in the English Channel off the coast of Normandy, with an altitude of 114 metres (374 ft).

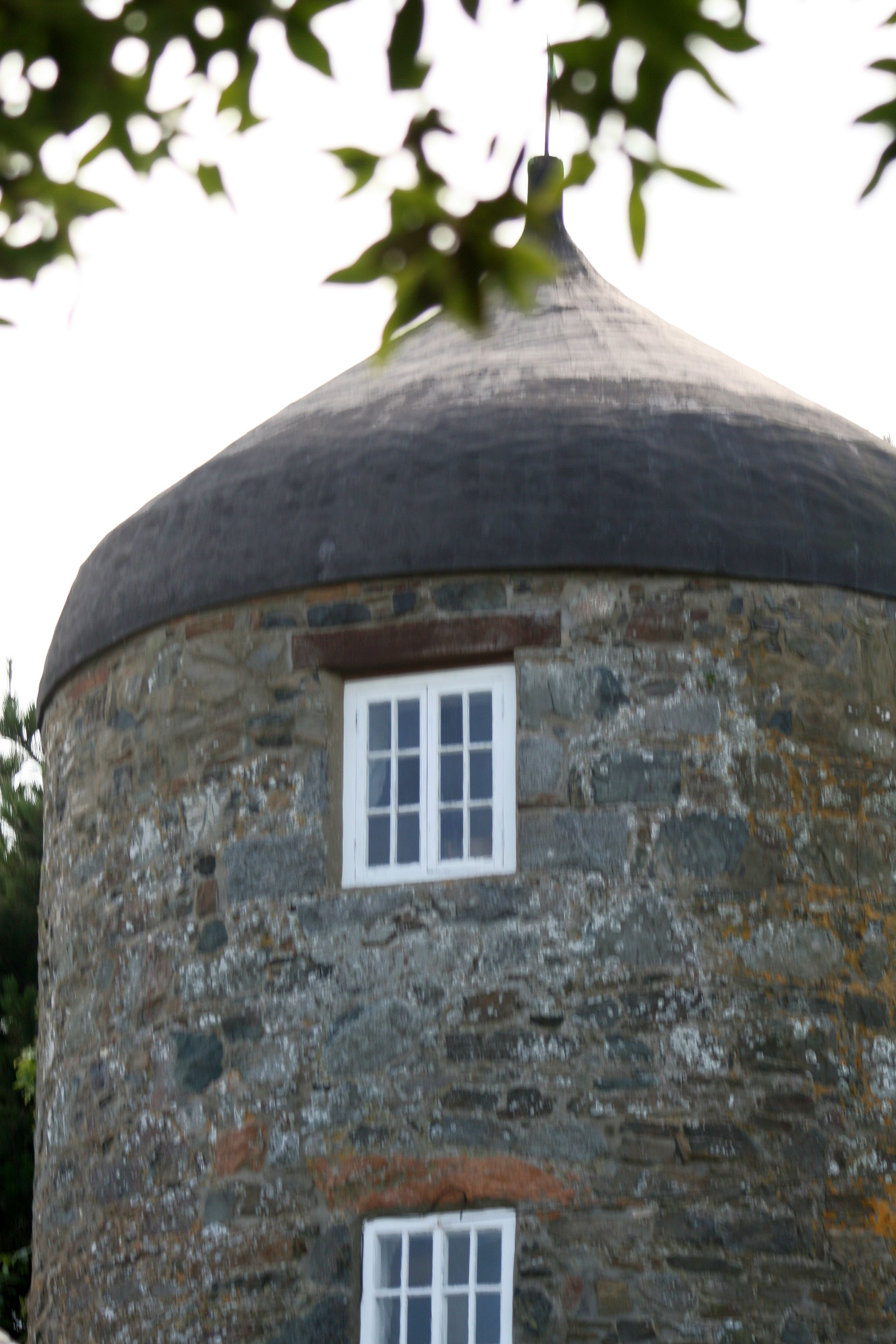
The former windmill on Sark's highest point

== See also ==
- Geography of Guernsey
- Le Moulin de Mougins (in France)
