= Bailiwick of Guernsey =

Crown Dependency in the English Channel

Guernsey Bailliage de Guernesey (French) Bailliage dé Guernési (Guernésiais)
- British Crown Dependency
- Bailiwick of Guernsey
- Flag Coat of arms
- Anthem: Various: "God Save the King" (Note: "God Save the King" is the national anthem by custom, not statute, and there is no authorised version. Typically only the first verse is usually sung, although the second verse is also often sung as well at state and public events. The words King, he, him, his, used at present, are replaced by Queen, she, her when the monarch is female.) Unofficial: "Sarnia Cherie"
- Location of Bailiwick of Guernsey (circled red) in the English Channel (light blue)

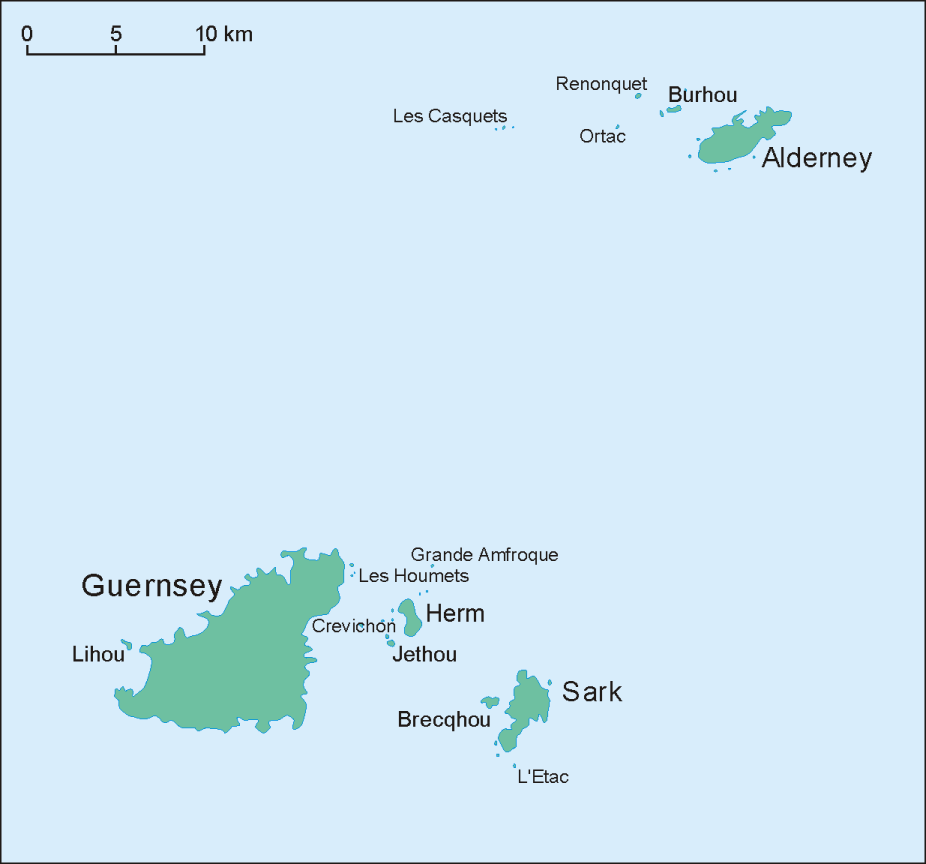
- Map of the Bailiwick
- Sovereign state responsible for the Bailiwick: United Kingdom
- Separation from the Duchy of Normandy: 1290
- Largest settlement and administrative centre: St. Peter Port (St. Pierre Port)
- Official languages: English
- Recognised national languages: Auregnais; Guernésiais; Sercquiais
- Religion: Church of England (official)

Government
  - Sovereign: Charles III
  - Lieutenant Governor: Sir Richard Cripwell
  - Bailiff: Jessica Roland
  - P&RC president: Lindsay de Sausmarez
- Legislature: States of Guernsey

Government of the United Kingdom
  - Minister: Baroness Levitt

Area
  - Total: 78 km^{2} (30 sq mi) (223rd)
  - Water (%): 0
- Highest elevation: 114 m (374 ft)

Population
  - 2016 estimate: 67,334 (206th)
  - Density: 844/km^{2} (2,185.9/sq mi) (14th)
- GDP (PPP): 2003 estimate
  - Total: $2.1 billion (176th)
  - Per capita: £33,123 (37th)
- GDP (nominal): 2023 estimate
  - Total: £3.488 billion (US$4.338 billion)
  - Per capita: £54,463 (US$67,739)
- HDI (2008): 0.975 very high · 9th
- Currency: Pound sterling Guernsey pound (£) (GBP)
- Time zone: UTC+00:00 (GMT)
  - Summer (DST): UTC+01:00 (BST)
- Date format: dd/mm/yyyy
- Mains electricity: 230 V–50 Hz
- Driving side: Left
- Calling code: +44
- ISO 3166 code: GG
- Internet TLD: .gg
- Jurisdictions: Alderney; Guernsey; Sark

Guernsey, officially the Bailiwick of Guernsey (French: Bailliage de Guernesey; Guernésiais: Bailliage dé Guernési) is a self-governing British Crown Dependency off the coast of Normandy, France, comprising several islands of the Channel Islands. It has a total land area of 78 square kilometres (30 mi^{2}) and an estimated total population of 67,336.

The Channel Islands were part of the Duchy of Normandy, whose dukes became kings of England from 1066. In 1204, as a consequence of the Treaty of Le Goulet, insular Normandy alone remained loyal to the English Crown, leading to a political split from the mainland. Around 1290, the Channel Islands' Governor, Otto de Grandson, split the archipelago into two bailiwicks, establishing those parts other than Jersey as a single Bailiwick of Guernsey.

The Bailiwick is a parliamentary constitutional monarchy, comprising three separate jurisdictions: Alderney, Guernsey (incorporating Herm), and Sark. The lieutenant governor is the representative of the British monarch, who remains the head of state. The States of Guernsey is the parliament and government of the whole Bailiwick, though several matters are decided locally by the States of Alderney and by Sark's Chief Pleas, which is considered a separate self-governing state, which delegates certain powers to the Bailiwick. The bailiff of Guernsey is the civil head of the Bailiwick, and is also president of the States of Guernsey and head of the Bailiwick's judiciary.

The Bailiwick is self-governing and not part of the United Kingdom. Its defence and international representation — as well as certain policy areas, such as nationality law — are the responsibility of the UK Government, but the Bailiwick still has a separate international identity.

== History ==
The history of the Bailiwick of Guernsey goes back to 933, when the islands came under the control of William Longsword, having been annexed from the Duchy of Brittany by the Duchy of Normandy. The island of Guernsey and the other Channel Islands formed part of the lands of William the Conqueror. In 1204, France conquered mainland Normandy – but not the offshore islands of the bailiwick. The islands represent the last remnants of the medieval Duchy of Normandy.

Initially, there was one governor, or co-governors working together, of the islands making up the Channel Islands. The title "governor" has changed over the centuries. "Warden", "keeper", and "captain" have previously been used. The bailiff stands in for the Governor, or more recently the Lieutenant Governor, if the latter is absent, for a short term or for longer: for instance during the five years of the German occupation of the Channel Islands. The Lieutenant Governor of Guernsey is the Lieutenant Governor of the Bailiwick of Guernsey and, being the personal representative of the British monarch, has usually had a distinguished military service.

Originally, the local courts in Guernsey were "fiefs" with the lord of the manor presiding. Before 1066, a superior court was introduced above the fiefs and below the Eschequier Court in Rouen and comprised the bailiff and four knights; the court heard appeals and tried criminal cases.

Otton de Grandson, then the governor of the Islands, delegated the civil powers to two separate bailiffs for Guernsey and Jersey before he went on crusade to the Holy Land in 1290. This can be assessed as the date of first creation of the two bailiwicks.

== Geography ==
Islands and islets belonging to the Bailiwick of Guernsey, shown within the Channel Islands

Situated around 49.4°N 2.6°W, Alderney, Guernsey, Herm, Sark, and some other smaller islands together have a total area of 78 km^{2} (30 sq mi) and coastlines of about 50 km (31 mi). Elevation varies from sea level to 114 m (374 ft) at Le Moulin on Sark.

There are many smaller islands, islets, rocks and reefs in the Bailiwick. Combined with a tidal range of 10 m (33 ft) and fast currents of up to 12 knots (14 mph; 22 km/h), sailing in local waters is dangerous.

== Constitutional status ==
The Bailiwick of Guernsey is a separate jurisdiction in itself and is, in turn, also three separate sub-jurisdictions. It does not form part of, and is separate from (but is not independent of, or from), the United Kingdom. The two Bailiwicks of Jersey and Guernsey together make up the Channel Islands.

The islanders have never had formal representation in the House of Commons of the British Parliament, nor the European Parliament. Those islanders who were not somehow qualified and eligible in their own right to register to vote and to vote in the United Kingdom under the Representation of the People Acts as "overseas voters", were excluded from the 2016 United Kingdom European Union membership referendum.

Guernsey has an unwritten constitution arising from the Treaty of Paris (1259). When Henry III and the King of France came to terms over the Duchy of Normandy, the Norman mainland fell under the suzerainty of the King of France. The Channel Islands, however, remained loyal to the English Crown due to the loyalties of its Seigneurs. However, they were never absorbed into the Kingdom of England by any Act of Union, but exist as "peculiars of the Crown".

A unique constitutional position has arisen as successive British monarchs have confirmed the liberties and privileges of the Bailiwick, often referring to the so-called Constitutions of King John, a legendary document supposed to have been granted by King John in the aftermath of 1204. Governments of the Bailiwick have generally tried to avoid testing the limits of the unwritten constitution by avoiding conflict with British governments.

This peculiar political position has often been to the benefit of islanders. Until the 19th century, the Bailiwick was generally exempt from the harsher parts of Westminster legislation while being included in favourable policies, such as protectionist economic policies. England, and later the United Kingdom, passively exploited the strategic benefits of the Channel Islands. For example, the islands were a convenient stop-off point for trade to Gascony.

== Parishes ==
The bailiwick comprises twelve parishes: Alderney, Sark, and ten on mainland Guernsey (one of which includes Herm). Each parish has a parish church dating from the 11th century, with strong religious control exercised initially by the French Catholic church and for the last 500 years by the English church. Over the years, the religious aspect of the administration of each parish has been reduced in favour of democratically elected douzeniers.

== Jurisdictions ==
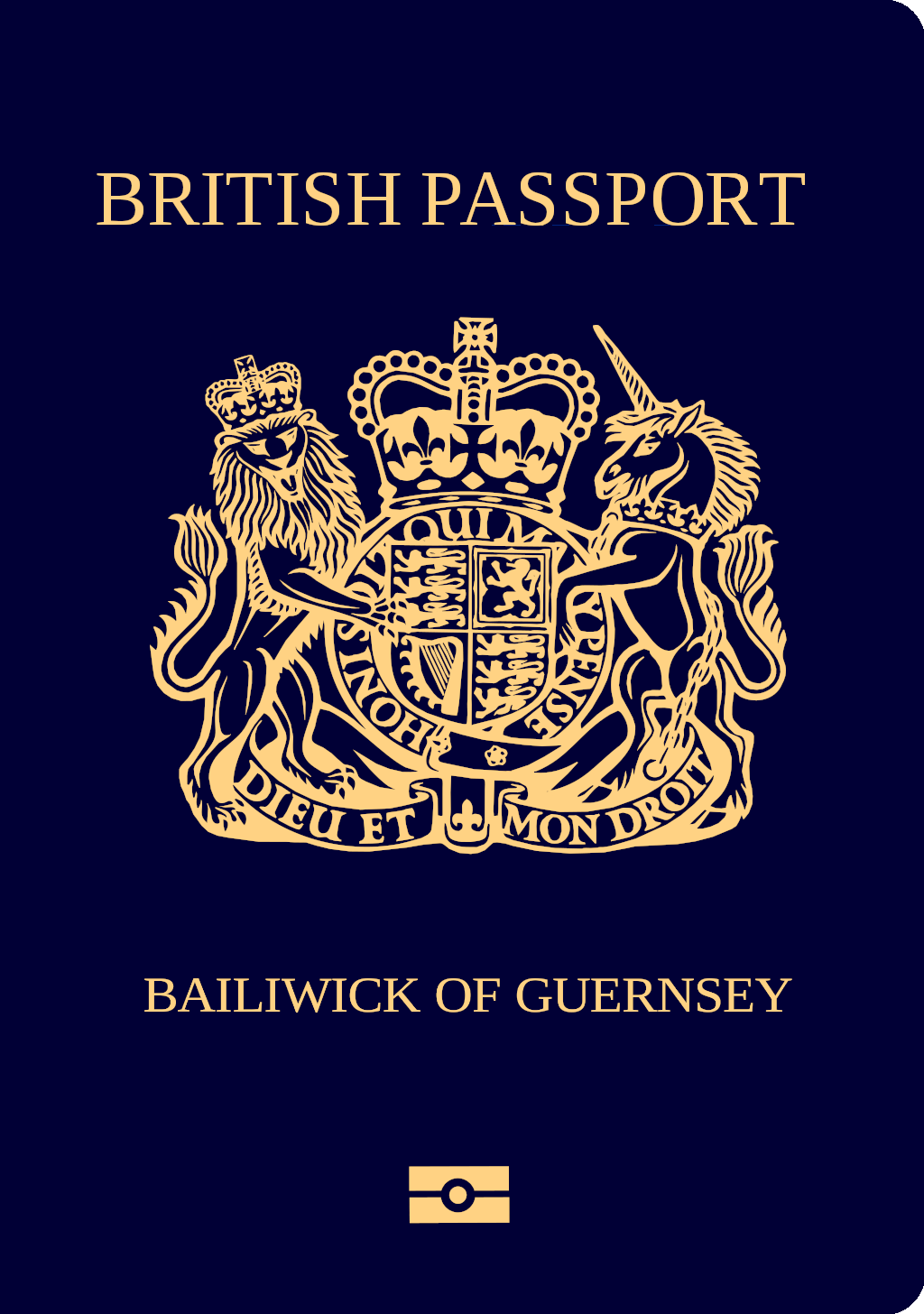
British passport (Bailiwick of Guernsey)

Each jurisdiction has inhabited and uninhabited islands and its own elected government. All three legal jurisdictions need royal assent from the Monarch on its primary legislation, but as of February 29, 2024, certain domestic primary legislation need only the Lieutenant-Governor's assent. Each jurisdiction raises its own taxation, although in 1949 Alderney transferred its rights to Guernsey.

=== Alderney ===
With a population of around 2,200 in 7.8 km^{2} (3 square miles), Alderney has its own parliament, the States of Alderney, which has ten elected members and an elected president.

From 1612, Alderney had a judge appointed, with similar judicial powers to a bailiff, but on 1 January 1949, the island adopted a new constitution, giving up some independence, moving closer to Guernsey, and confirming that it is part of the Bailiwick of Guernsey.

=== Guernsey ===
The island of Guernsey has a population of around 63,000 in 62 km^{2} (24 square miles) and forms the legal and administrative centre of the Bailiwick of Guernsey. The parliament of Guernsey and the nearby inhabited islands of Herm, Jethou and Lihou is the States of Guernsey.

=== Sark ===
Sark has a population of around 600 who live in 5.2 km^{2} (2 square miles). Its parliament (together with the inhabited island of Brecqhou) is the Chief Pleas of Sark, with 18 elected members.

In 1565, Helier de Carteret, Seigneur of St. Ouen in Jersey, was granted the fief of Sark by Queen Elizabeth I. He received letters patent granting him Sark in perpetuity on condition that he kept the island free of pirates and that at least forty men occupied it to defend it. Despite most families coming from Jersey, Sark remained within the Bailiwick of Guernsey.

== Recognition ==
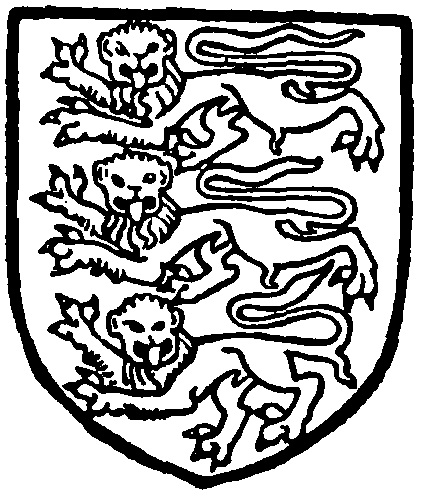
Duchy of Normandy three leopards symbol

There is no flag or coat of arms for the Bailiwick of Guernsey. In historic times, the governor would have used his personal symbols before a generic flag was created for use by the governor.

In 1279, Edward I granted a Seal for use in the Channel Islands. In 1304, separate seals were provided to Jersey and Guernsey. The provision of different seals is one of the earliest indications of the individual identity and personality of the two Bailiwicks. The seal comprised three leopards (or lions), a symbol taken from the original arms of the Duchy of Normandy.

The United Kingdom and His Majesty's Government in the United Kingdom are responsible for the defence and also for formal international, intergovernmental, and consular representation of, and the foreign affairs generally, of the Bailiwick.

While never a member of the European Union (EU) or its predecessors, before Brexit the Bailiwick had a special relationship with the EU under Protocol 3 of the UK's Treaty of Accession 1972 to the European Community. Pooling resources with Jersey, the Bailiwick established in 2010 an office in Brussels to develop the Channel Islands' influence with the EU, to advise the Channel Islands' governments on European matters, and to promote economic links with the EU.

The Bailiwick of Guernsey is in the Commonwealth (Commonwealth of Nations), although not as a member, in its own right. The Bailiwick is also a member of the Commonwealth Games Federation and competes in the Commonwealth Games.

In 1969, the Royal Mail relinquished control of postal services in the Bailiwick, with Guernsey then being recognised by the Universal Postal Union.

Since 1999, the Bailiwick of Guernsey has been a member of the British–Irish Council, currently represented by the Chief Minister of Guernsey.

== See also ==
- Outline of the Bailiwick of Guernsey
