= Rail transport in Guernsey =

There have been two railways within the state territories of the Bailiwick of Guernsey, a British Crown Dependency comprising six inhabited islands.

- The Guernsey Railway operated from 1879 to 1934 on the principal island, Guernsey.
- The Alderney Railway opened in 1847 and continues to operate on the second largest island of the bailiwick, Alderney.
- During World War II, German engineers built, modified and extended rail lines on both Alderney and Guernsey

== Guernsey ==
=== Early tramways ===
The earlier transport system was worked by steam, and was named the Guernsey Steam Tramway. It began service on 6 June 1879 with six locomotives. The Guernsey Railway, which was virtually an electric tramway, and which began working on 20 February 1892, was abandoned on 9 June 1934.

=== Second World War ===
During the German occupation of the Channel Islands in the Second World War, 900 mm (2 ft 11 7/16 in) light railways were built by German engineers and the Organisation Todt in Guernsey in 1941 and 1942 to help build and supply coastal fortifications, such as Fort Hommet. The line ran from Saint Peter Port to L'Eree via St Sampson and L'Ancresse. This included railway sidings at L'Islet.

There were spurs of 600 mm (1 ft 11 5/8 in). No attempt was made to take the lines to the higher parishes in the south of the island. All the surface laid tracks were dismantled after the occupation.

=== Miniature railway ===
The only railway service currently running on Guernsey is the Sausmarez Manor Miniature Railway line, which first opened in 1985 and runs a quarter of a mile loop through some woodland. The engine is a BR class 25 outline 7¼" gauge 4-4wPH named 'Remus', which was a 1989 home build by a Mr T. Leigh.

== Alderney ==
The Alderney Railway provides a rail link of approximately 2 miles (3.2 km), with a regular timetabled service during the summer months and at seasonal festivals including Easter and Christmas. It is now the only working railway on the Channel Islands to provide a public transport link. It is also one of the oldest railways in the British Isles, dating from 1847, and carried Queen Victoria and Prince Albert as the first 'official' passengers in 1857.

During World War II, the Germans lifted part of the 1,435 mm (4 ft 8 1/2 in) standard gauge line and replaced it with a 900 mm (2 ft 11 7/16 in) line, worked by two Feldbahn 0-4-0 diesel locomotives.

There is also a 7 1/4 in (184 mm) gauge miniature railway on Alderney, which operates during the summer months.

== See also ==
- Transport in Guernsey
