= Árbæjarsafn =

Museum in Iceland

Coordinates: 64°07′08″N 21°48′58″W

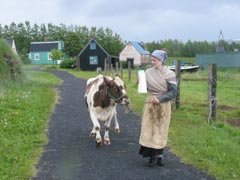
The resident cow prepares to be milked.

Árbæjarsafn (Icelandic pronunciation: [ˈaurˌpaiːjarˌsapn̥]) is the historical museum of the city of Reykjavík as well as an open-air museum and a regional museum. Its purpose is to give the public an insight into the living conditions, work and recreational activities of the people of Reykjavík in earlier times.

== History ==
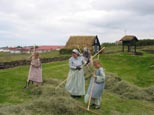
Old-fashioned haymaking at Arbær Museum.

Around the middle of the 20th century, there was growing concern that "old Reykjavík" was disappearing forever. The first efforts to found a museum came in 1942, when the city council was presented with a petition to that effect. The request was well-received, and forwarded for comment to the Reykjavík Society, a group concerning itself with local history. The systematic collection of documents on the town's history began about that time, laying the foundations for the city's archives.

In 1954, the Reykjavík Archives and Historical Collection were officially founded and Lárus Sigurbjörnsson was hired as director, and he set about collecting artefacts of many kinds.

Things now moved quickly. The old farm Árbær [ˈaurˌpaiːr̥], which had long been a popular rest stop and inn for people on the way to and from Reykjavík, had been abandoned and the farm buildings were in poor condition due to weathering and vandalism. In 1957, the city council agreed that a public park and open-air museum with old houses of historical value should be created there. It was opened in August of that year.

Árbæjarsafn was first conceived as a department of the Archives and Historical Collection of Reykjavík, an open-air museum where the living environment of past generations could be re-created in an authentic manner. In 1968, the Reykjavík Historical Museum and the Árbæjarsafn were consolidated under the name Árbær Museum. In 1974 the city council decided to create the office of municipal curator. The first holder was Nanna Hermansson (1974-1984), followed by Ragnheiður Þórarinsdóttir (1984-1989), Margrét Hallgrímsdóttir (1989-2000) and the current office holder Guðný Gerður Gunnarsdóttir (2000-).

When the museum was founded in 1957, it was located a short distance outside the built-up areas of Reykjavík. Since then, the city has grown considerably, and now reaches far beyond the museum area.

In 2006 the museum opened a new exhibition in central Reykjavík, based on archaeological findings. That exhibition is called Reykjavík 871±2.

The museum was awarded the Icelandic Museum award for the year 2006.

== Houses ==
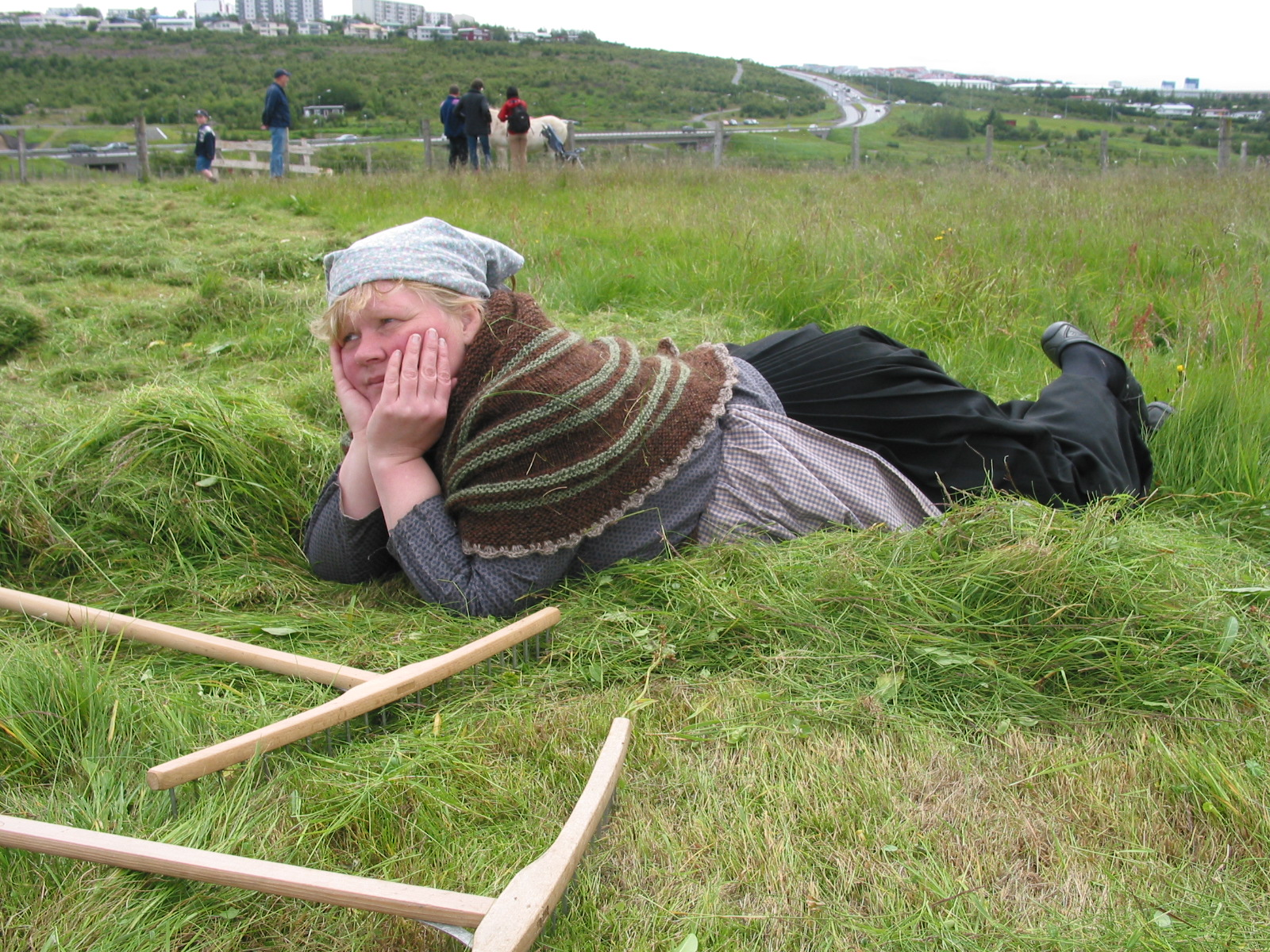
Haymaking

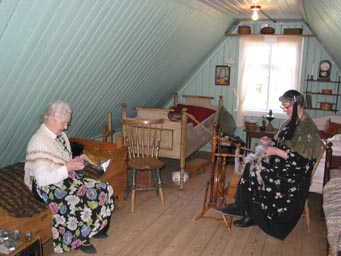
Scene from the old farm

Buildings in the museum are:

- Laugavegur 62: the ticket office, a former shop on Reykjavík's most famous shopping street.
- Professor's house, which houses the museum offices. Originally built as residence for the Chief Medical Officer at Kleppur mental hospital.
- Landakot (or ÍR-House): built in 1897 as the first Catholic church since the Reformation. Was later used as a gym.
- Laufásvegur: donated by the British Embassy in the 1960s. Currently the residence of the museum custodian and their family.
- Suðurgata 7: originally located in the city centre, now housing three exhibitions: the home of a wealthy family around 1910, a jeweller's workshop and an exhibition on women's clothing.
- Lækjargata 4: currently houses the museum General Store as well as an exhibition on the history of Reykjavík.
- Líkn (Relief): used for administrative purposes.
- Stable: a typical stable from the city centre.
- Efstibær: a labourer's cottage from the 19th century. Currently housing an exhibition on the life of workers during the Great Depression.
- Dillon's House: the museum coffee shop.
- Þingholtsstræti 9: a 19th-century house, which currently houses an exhibition on the house's original residents.
- Blacksmith's house: a blacksmith's house
- Hábær: a half stone house, originally home to 19th century landless labourers.
- Nýlenda: also a half stone house.
- Miðhús: a late 19th-century home of landless labourers.
- Reykhólar: home to the museum's assistant custodian.
- Gold Drill: originally used to search for gold, but later used to drill for hot water.
- Nissen hut: a World War II Nissen hut, used for storage.
- Ívarssel: originally home to a well known fishing boat captain. Awaiting restoration.
- Slaughterhouse: an early 19th-century warehouse, now houses an exhibition on building techniques in Reykjavík in the period 1840-1940.
- Granary: also a 19th-century warehouse. Used for temporary exhibitions.
- Árbær Farm: the only one of the museum's houses still standing on its original spot.
- Smithy: a 1960s replica of a smithy.
- Church: the museum church comes from the North of Iceland. It is consecrated and is rented out for various services.
- Vestry: built in the 1960s to provide room for a priest and other people using the church.
- Boy Scout hut: the first Boy Scout cabin built in Iceland.

== Opening hours ==
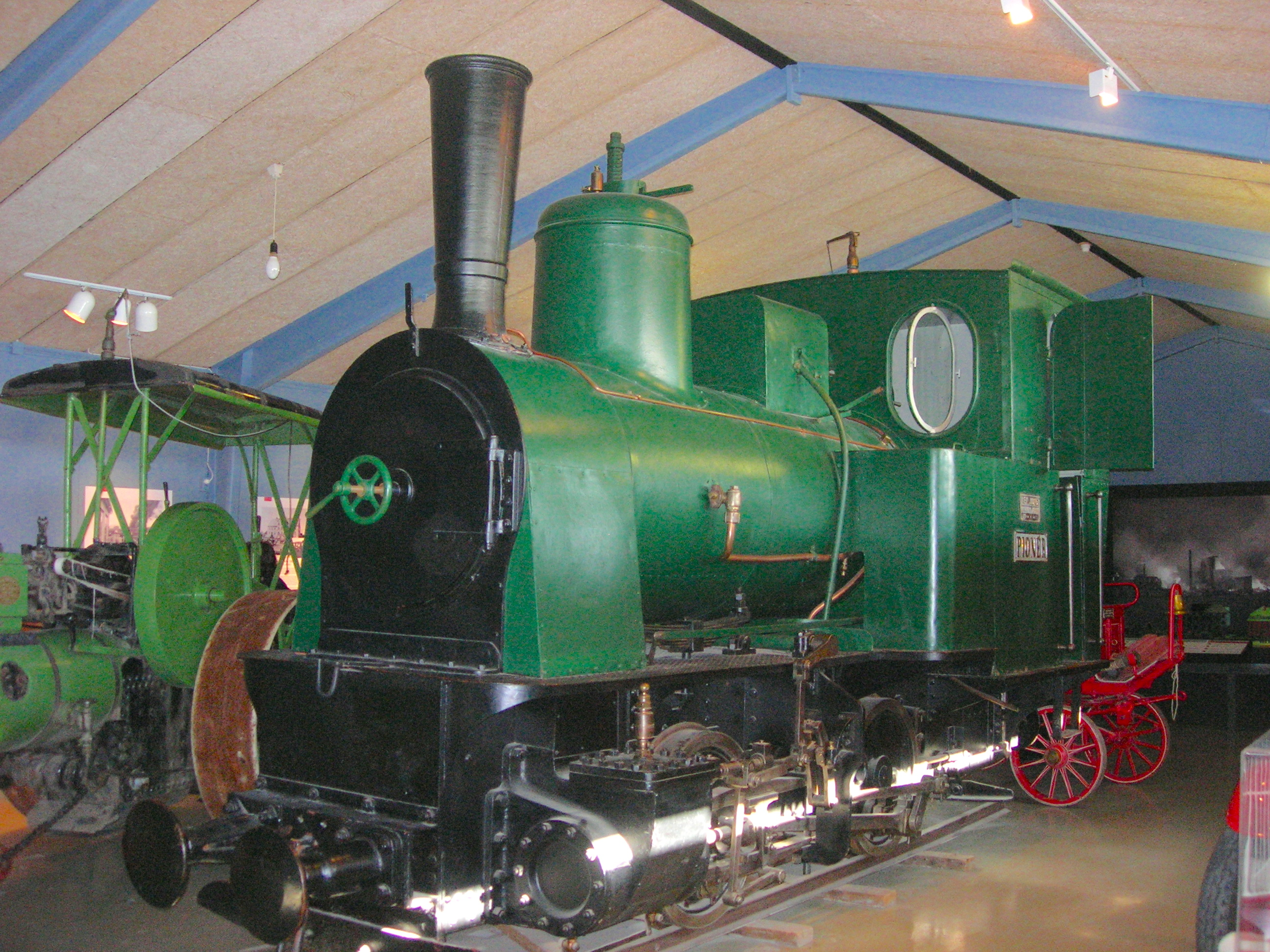
Locomotive Pioner from the Harbour railway, as preserved at the museum today.

The museum is open from June 1 to August 31 from 10.00-17.00. During the Winter season, September 1 to May 31, the museum offers guided tours every day at 1300, except for certain public holidays like Christmas Day, New Years Day and Easter Sunday.

The gift shop and other facilities are not usually open during the winter season; however, the museum office and library may often be accessed out-of-season. Visitors arriving early for the 1300 hours guided tour may even be invited to wait in the library.

Although the site is a little way out of the city centre, there is a very good bus service to the museum, operating at roughly half-hour intervals, with a bus stop immediately outside the main entrance.

== Further information ==
City Museum homepage

== Sources ==
- Árbæjarsafn guidebook
