= Torfi Jónsson í Klofa =

Torfi Jónsson í Klofa (Icelandic pronunciation: [ˈtʰɔrvɪ ˈjounsɔn iː ˈkʰlɔːva]; c. 1460–1504), also known as Torfi ríki (pronounced [ˈriːcɪ]; 'Torfi the Powerful/Rich') or Torfi stóri (pronounced [ˈstouːrɪ]; 'Torfi the Great'), was an Icelandic sýslumaður and chieftain of the fifteenth century, a significant figure who had tough dealings with Stefán Jónsson, Bishop of Skálholt, and had Lénharð fógeti killed in 1502. Torfi's life is reported in a number of folktales as well as contemporary records, and fact in his life is sometimes hard to distinguish from legend.

== Life ==
Torfi's parents were Ingibjörg Eiríksdóttir and her husband Jón Ólafsson, a farmer and sýslumaður in Klofi, son of Ólafur Loftsson (d. c. 1458), the son of Loftur ríki Guttormsson. Jón died sometime after 1471 and in 1481 Ingibjörg married Ormur Jónsson í Klofa, a farmer and later sýslumaður of Skarð á Skarðsströnd, who was within four degrees of relation to Ingibjörg and so had to receive papal dispensation to marry her. Ormur and Ingibjörg got into disputes with Bishop Stefán Jónsson, partly because they were sheltering criminals whom the Bishop wanted to take into his power.

Torfi, who lived in Hvammur í Dölum and Hjörsey in Mýrar before he moved to Klofi, also had disputes with the bishop, both because Torfi protected people from prosecution by the bishop and also the bishop did not think he paid all of his tithes and other taxes to the Church. Torfi seems to have been a major troublemaker, who would stop at nothing. It is, however, said that relations between Torfi and the bishop settled down after Torfi was struck with illness at the Alþingi, giving a great cry and becoming so strong that it took eight men to hold him and tied him up. The bishop had the priests calm him with readings and singing until Torfi slept and thereafter was less troublesome.

In 1502 Torfi had Lénharður fógeti killed. Little is known about Lénharður, a foreign thief based at Arnarbæli. Torfi pursued him with a posse and had him killed at Hraun í Ölfusi. Torfi confessed this to Bishop Stefán but the bishop did not impose a major penance, considering the killing a public service.

At the Alþingi in 1504, Torfi was again being aggressive, wanting to drive the sýslumaður Arnór Finnsson from office, influencing the judgement with a band of armed men. Not long afterwards, Torfi died. There are two accounts of his death: he is generally said to have died from sickness at Skíðbakki in Landeyjar, or from drinking at Fíflholtsþing. After his death, his widow made peace with Bishop Stefán, handing over three farms and a silver cross for Torfi to be buried at Skálholt, as he had wished.

Torfi's wife was Helga Guðnadóttir (d. 1544), daughter of the sýslumaður Guðni Jónsson of Kirkjuból, the brother of Torfi's stepfather Ormur Jónsson, and his wife Þóra, the daughter of Björn Þorleifsson hirðstjóri of Skarð. Helga and Torfi had many children, most of whom were still children when their father died. Helga lived as a widow at Klofi until 1525.

== Appearances in popular culture ==
Torfi allegedly gives his name to Torfajökull where, according to legend, he found a hidden valley where took his people in 1493 to escape the plague.

Some of Torfi's exploits are recounted and utilised in Kristín Helga Gunnarsdóttir's children's novel Ríólítreglan (Reykjavík: Mál og Menning, 2011).
