= Borkumer Kleinbahn =

German narrow-gauge railway line

Borkumer Kleinbahn Borkum narrow-gauge railway
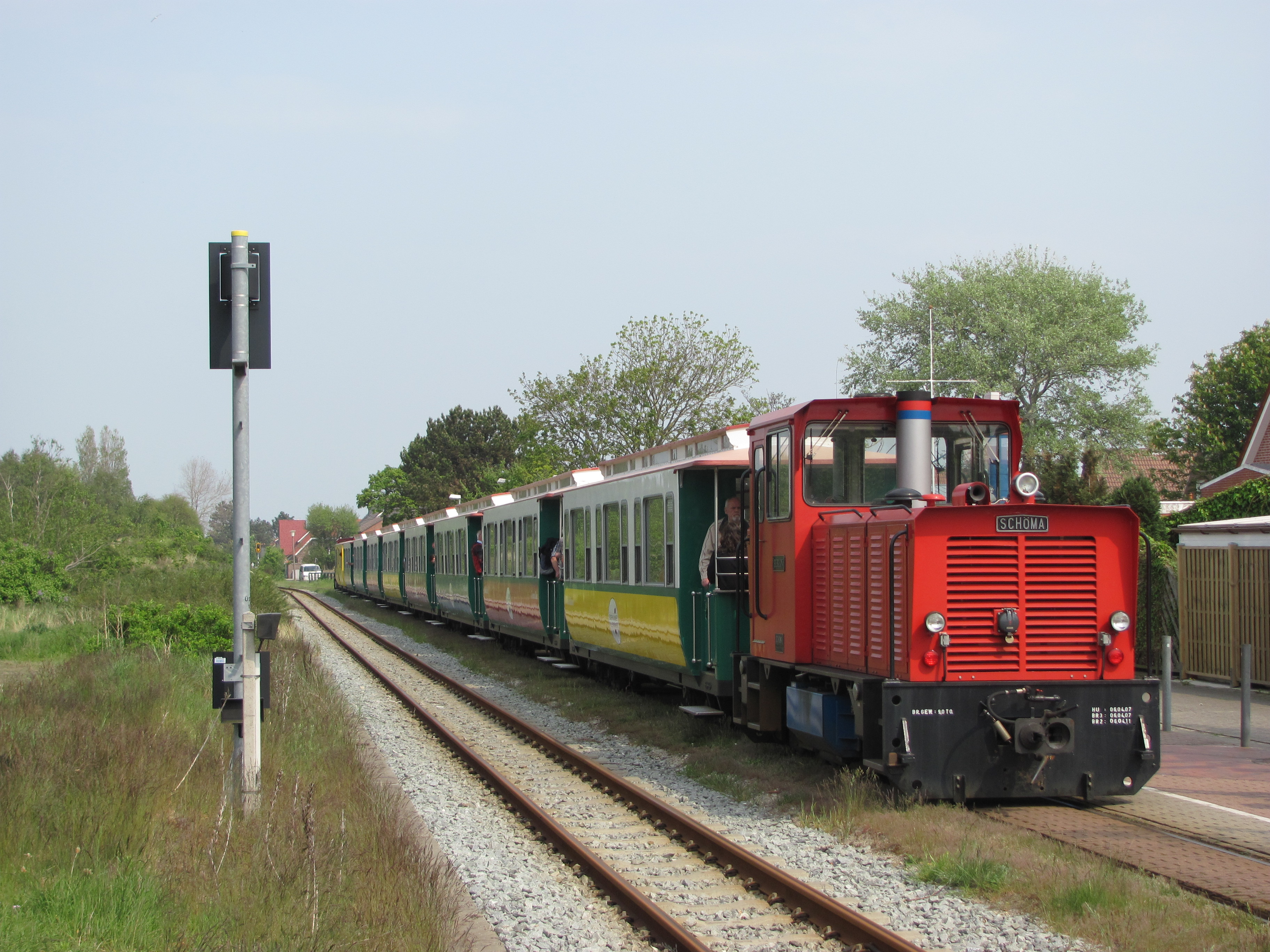
- A diesel locomotive hauled train in May 2012

Technical
- Line length: 7.4 km (5 mi)
- Number of tracks: 2
- Track gauge: 900 mm (2 ft 11 7/16 in)

The Borkumer Kleinbahn is a 900 mm (2 ft 11 7/16 in) narrow gauge railway on the German island of Borkum in the North Sea. It is the oldest island railway (German: Inselbahn) in Germany, beginning operation in 1888.

== Line ==
The 7.5 km (5 mi) long line connects the port with the town of Borkum. It is double tracked since the early 20th century.

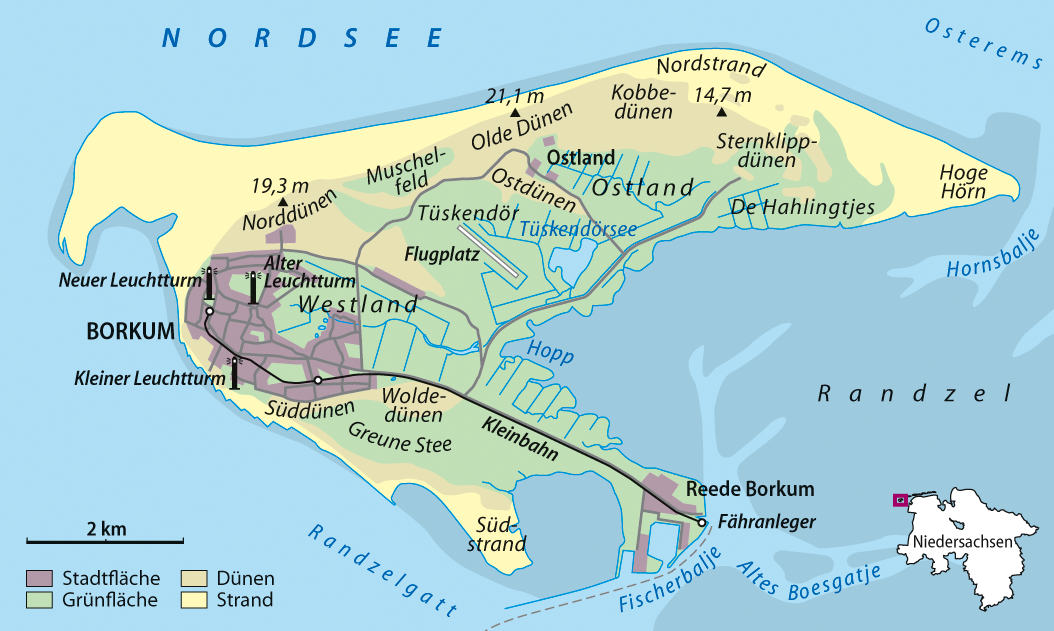
A map of the island showing the railway line

== History ==
In 1879, tracks for a horse-drawn railway line were laid for the construction of a new lighthouse. The tracks were converted for locomotive-hauled trains about 10 years later, and the line opened in 1888 as a successor of the horsedrawn line. The network reached its peak length in 1938, with a track length of about 45 km (28 mi). The line celebrated its 125th anniversary on June 15, 2013.

== Rolling stock ==
The fleet consists of multiple passenger cars, diesel locomotives, steam locomotives and a Wismar railbus, which was built in 1940. A steam locomotive from the Bäderbahn Molli is scheduled to run on the line in summer 2019. Both Bäderbahn Molli and the Borkumer Kleinbahn have the same 900 mm (2 ft 11 7/16 in) track gauge.

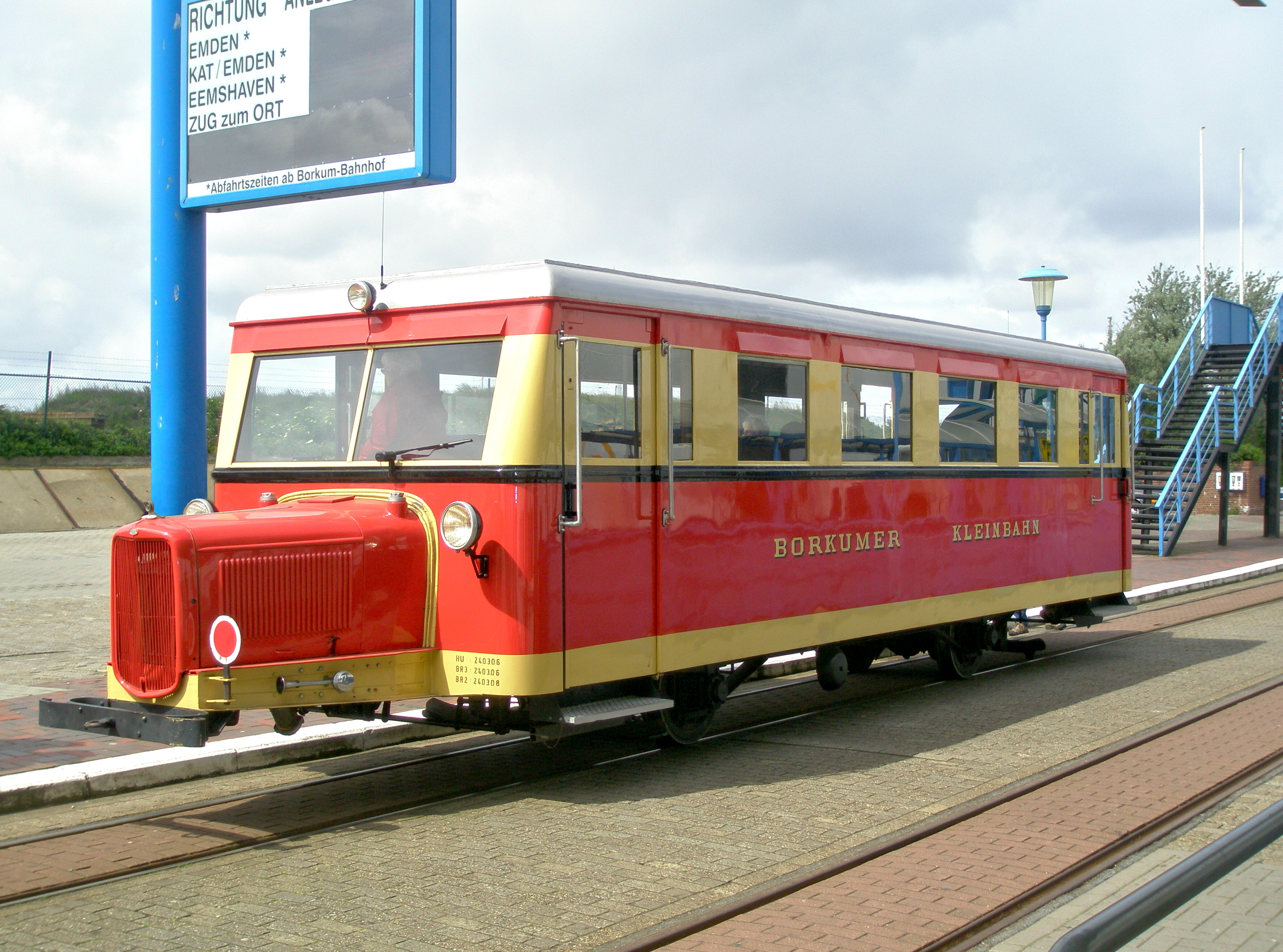
The Wismar railbus in June 2009

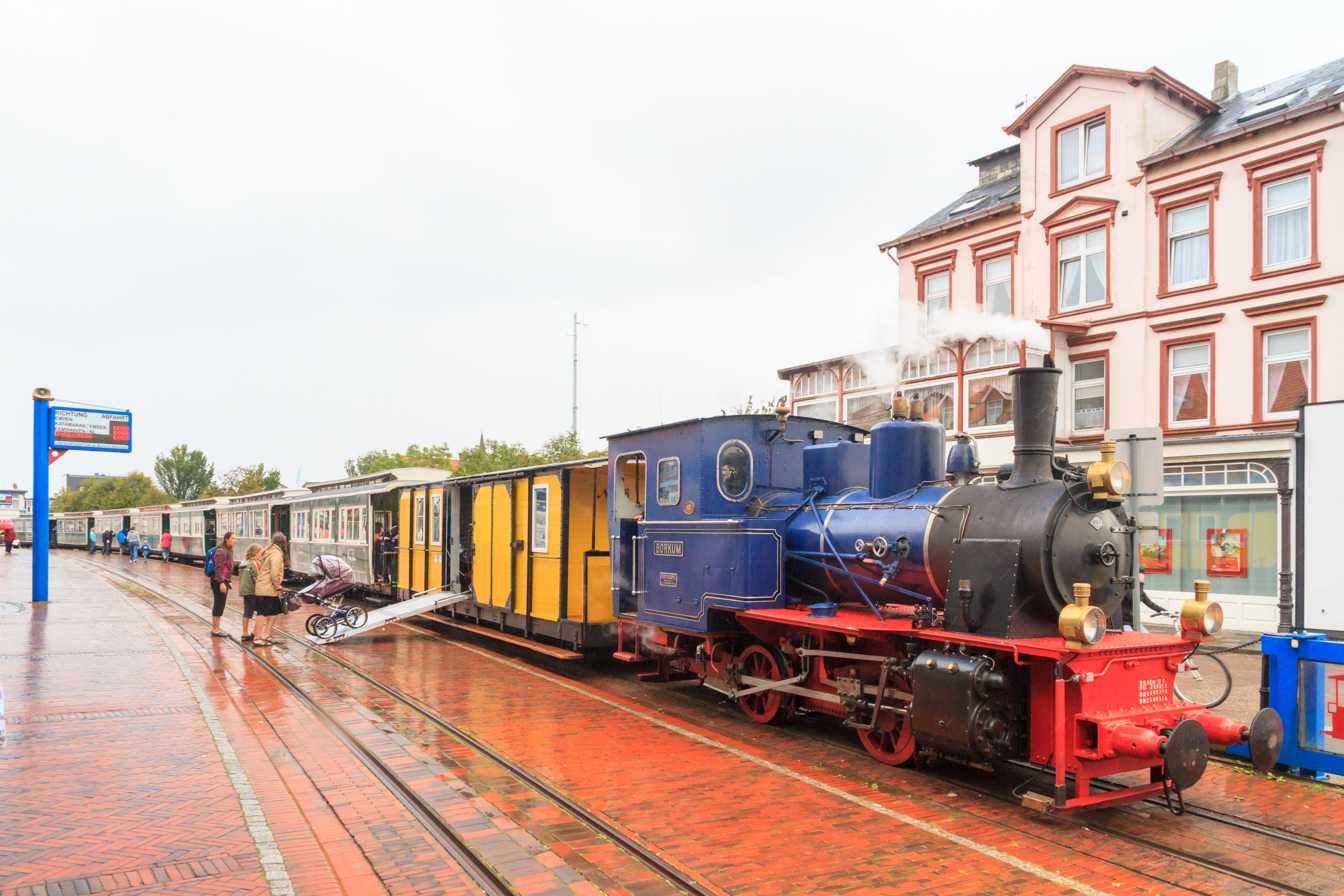
Steam engine Borkum in August 2015
