= Torfajökull =

Volcano in Iceland

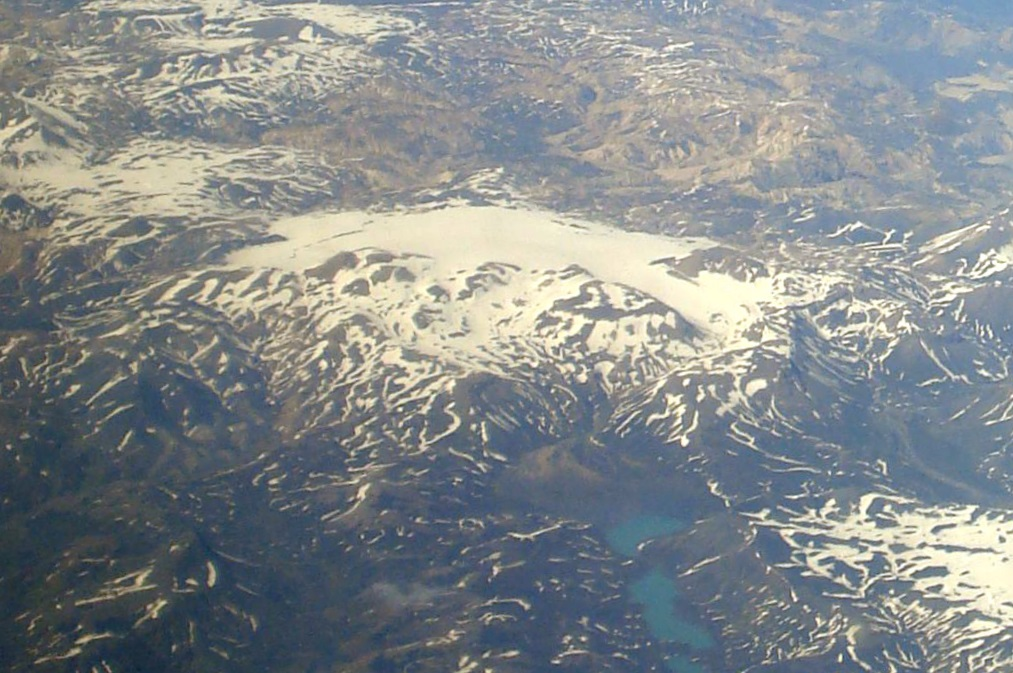
- Torfajökull

Highest point
- Elevation: 1,281 m (4,203 ft) (Note: This article when reviewed as a stub gave an unreferenced height of 1,259 m (4,131 ft) which does not agree with any identified original source but is close to the current height of Kaldaklofsfjöll. So to provide best article historic consistency the height of Háskerðingur as determined by modern survey methods at 1,281 m (4,203 ft) was chosen. Traditional survey height of Háskerðingur was 1,278 m (4,193 ft). The peak near the southern edge of the Torfajökull glacier was 1,190 m (3,900 ft) by traditional survey, but is 1,199 m (3,934 ft) on modern survey and one to the north-east of the glacier had been by traditional survey assigned a height of 1,175 m (3,855 ft) but on modern survey is 1,192 m (3,911 ft). The heights quoted in the volcano literature of 1,190 m (3,900 ft) and 1,280 m (4,200 ft) which are usually trusted sources, may thus be explained.)
- Coordinates: 63°55′00″N 19°10′00″W

Dimensions
- Area: 450 km^{2} (170 sq mi)

Geography
- Location within Iceland
- Geological features near the Torfajökull volcanic system (red outlines) - In particular note that the Bárðarbunga volcanic system is also emphasised as the last two Torfajökull rhyolites (877 and 1477 CE) were erupted simultaneous with Veidivötn (Bárðarbunga) basalts (Light violet shading). Legend: Other shading shows: calderas; central volcanoes; fissure swarms; subglacial terrain above 1,100 m (3,600 ft); seismically active areas; Clicking on the rectangle in the image enlarges to full window and enables mouse-over with more detail.
- Location: Iceland

Geology
- Rock age: Pleistocene
- Mountain type: Stratovolcano
- Last eruption: March 1477

Torfajökull (Icelandic for "Torfi's glacier"; Icelandic pronunciation: [ˈtʰɔrvaˌjœːkʏtl̥]) is a rhyolitic stratovolcano, with a large caldera (central volcano) capped by a glacier of the same name and associated with a complex of subglacial volcanoes. Torfajökull last erupted in 1477 and consists of the largest area of silicic extrusive rocks in Iceland. This is now known to be due to a VEI 5 eruption 55,000 years ago.

== Geography ==
The volcano is located north of Mýrdalsjökull and south of Þórisvatn Lake, Iceland. To its south-west is the volcano and glacier of Tindfjallajökull and almost directly to its west is the volcano of Hekla. Adjacent to the southern edge of its glacier of Torfajökull it has a peak of 1,199 m (3,934 ft) but the south-eastern caldera margin also extends to the glacier of Kaldaklofsjökull, which is on the western slopes of a peak called Háskerðingur that is 1,281 m (4,203 ft) high. Laufafell dome at 1,164 m (3,819 ft) is at the north-western edge of the Torfajökull volcanic system and almost halfway between Hekla and the glacier of Torfajökull.

== Volcano ==
The volcano's eruption around 870, a combined bimodal eruption (rhyolite-basalt) with additional input from a Bárðarbunga-Veiðivötn volcanic system dyke, has left a thin layer of easily recognized mixed tephra all over Iceland, the Settlement Layer or Landnámslag. This layer makes it possible to determine the exact dates of many archeological finds by tephrochronology, and such have been dated in The Settlement Exhibition, Reykjavík City Museum to before 877 ± 2 CE. (Note: Timings published before 2017 in the literature for the Settlement tephra layer need adjustment. The Greenland ice core studies now date this as 877, while previous to 2017 this was dated as 871. Timings were adjusted after the Icelandic tree ring series was extended to 822.) There was another bimodal eruption in March 1477.

=== Geology ===
Amongst Icelandic volcanoes, Torfajökull has a unique position at the intersection of the rift zone that is the extension of the Mid-Atlantic Ridge and the South Iceland seismic zone transform zone connecting to the Reykjanes Peninsula/ridge. The central volcano, is a rhyolitic plateau 600 m (2,000 ft) above the surrounding tholeiitic basalts with initial formation at least 384,000 years ago. As well as containing the largest geothermal system in Iceland at 150 km^{2} (58 sq mi), it has a 18 km × 12 km (11.2 mi × 7.5 mi) caldera, with 450 km^{2} (170 sq mi) of rhyolitic exposed extrusives; the largest extent of such rocks in Iceland. The largest volume of rhyolite, being 25 km^{3} (6.0 cu mi) was erupted as the Þórsmörk ignimbrite and widespread North Atlantic and Greenland II-RHY-1 tephra layer about 55,000 years ago. (Note: All the previous timings based on lava samples were off by 22,000 years, and events assigned to about 70,000 years ago before 2019 are still in the recent literature. This is because feldspar crystals yield older ages of 77 ± 6 ka than other techniques of which the currently most accurate time is 55.4 ± 2.5 ka.)

Within the area of the rhyolitic caldera there are younger extrusive rocks that involve basaltic magma mixing events by lateral propagation, from the fissure swarm of the Bárðarbunga-Veiðivötn volcanic system. The postglacial rhyolites were produced by partial melts of previously intruded mafic basalts that started forming between 17,000 and 62,000 years ago. It is known from elsewhere in Iceland that the melting of previous hydrated basaltic crust can be rapid over periods perhaps of 8000 years. That the last three (not just two) of these, erupted simultaneously with the Veiðivötn tholeiitic basalts along single, continuous fissures, indicates that the magma plumbing systems of the Torfajökull and southern Bárðarbunga volcanic systems are presently tectonically linked. Older rhyolites from west Torfajökull, arose from melts sourced from the transitional alkali basalts that are abundant in the South Iceland seismic zone and did not involve basalt sourcing and presumed intrusions from the Bárðarbunga volcanic system.

=== Seismic Activity ===
In the area of highest temperature geothermal activity of more than 340 °C (644 °F), there is an area of low-frequency earthquakes. An area of high-frequency earthquakes (4–10 Hz with magnitude less than 3) is in the western caldera, beneath the most recent eruptive sites, is believed to be related to brittle failure of the volcanic edifice. The western caldera is deflating vertically by about 12 mm (0.47 in)/year and there is evidence for a spherical 4 km (2.5 mi) diameter magma chamber at 8 km (5.0 mi) depth. Seismic studies have also detected structures between 1.5–6 km (0.93–3.73 mi) depth consistent with cold dikes along the north–east caldera border, and beyond the caldera, to its south–west and east, there are anomalies consistent with the presence of warm magma bodies.

=== Eruptions ===
The last four eruptions have been separated by about 940 years. The largest eruption known at about 55,400 years ago had a VEI of 5 or magnitude of 5.9.

The 1477 eruption involved the Laugahraun basaltic flow within the northern caldera and the Námshraun, Stútshraun (Norðurnámshraun), Frostastaðahraun, and Ljótipollur basalt flows to the north of Torfajökull's caldera boundary by up to about 5 km (3.1 mi). The eruptive fissure is at least 40 km (25 mi) long extending to the north.

The 877 "Settlement" eruption sequence is associated with the Bláhylur basalt explosion crater, which is located 2 km (1.2 mi) west of the later Ljótipollur flow and its fissure. On the other side of the caldera the 877 intrusion erupted at the west edge of the caldera rim the Hrafntinnuhraun flow. This eruption has a VEI of 3, with the rhyolitic Hrafntinnuhraun lava having a volume of 0.18 km^{3} (0.043 cu mi) and tephra to a volume of 0.4 km^{3} (0.096 cu mi) being erupted. Outside (SW) of the caldera rim, the Skyggnishlíðarvötn maars are also thought to have erupted during the eruption sequence, producing basaltic tephra that dispersed eastwards.

The younger part of the Dómadalshraun (Dómadalur) lava flows erupted about 150 CE west of the 1477 Namshraun flow, and has an area of 6 km^{2} (2.3 sq mi) and volume about 0.1 km^{3} (0.024 cu mi). To the north the 60 km^{2} (23 sq mi) Tjörvi lava was erupted simultaneously but from the Bárðarbunga Veidivötn fissure swam.

The older Dómadalshraun to its south of about 3100 BP is about 4 km (2.5 mi) west of the 1477 Námshraun flow.

The Markarfljöt domes formed about 3500 BP and are in the western central volcano area.

Just to the west of Laugahraun, and just outside the caldera margin is the Haölduhraun lava flow of about 6500 BP. The Hoy tephra from about this time is dated as between 6600 and 6120 cal BP, and the Lairg B tephra is dated as between 6728 and 6564 cal BP.

The Laufafell basalt lavas in the western central volcano area erupted about 6800 BP and are close to the Laufafell domes.

The oldest Dómadalshraun lava flow is dated to about 7000 BP and is about 2 km (1.2 mi) north of the Haölduhraun flow.

Just east of the Hrafntinnuhraun flow from the 877 eruption is the Sléttahraun lava flow that erupted about 8000 BP and east of that the Hrafntinnusker flow of about 7500 BP, which had an area of 9 km^{2} (3.5 sq mi) and volume up to 0.4 km^{3} (0.096 cu mi).

The Þórsmörk (Thorsmork) ignimbrite and widespread North Atlantic and Greenland II-RHY-1 tephra layer of 55,380 ± 2367 yr b2k Other ages determined ^{40}Ar/^{39}Ar dating are 51.3 ± 4.2 ka and 55.6 ± 4.8 ka. This, the largest known eruption had previously assigned to Tindfjöll (Tindfjallajökull) to the south in the 1980s as the Þórsmörk ignimbrite is to the east of Tindfjallajökull but the composition of other Tindfjallajökull eruptives later studied is different. The Þórsmörk ignimbrite had covered some of the sides of Tindfjallajökull but had a composition characteristic of Tindfjöll.

The Rauðfossafjöll tuya at the western aspects of the Torfajökull volcano is dated at 67,000 ± 9,000 years ago.

== Glaciers ==
Torfajökull
- Map of Torfajökull and to its west Kaldaklofsjökull glaciers. (light grey shading with white outline). Clicking on the map to enlarge it enables mouse over that allows identification of other glacial catchments.
- Type: Glacier
- Location: Iceland
- Coordinates: 63°53′39″N 19°07′37″W
- Area: 8.1 km^{2} (3.1 sq mi).
- Status: Retreating

The two glaciers, Torfajökull and Kaldaklofsjökull, that cover the south–eastern portions of the central volcano are regressing. In 1945, Torfajökull was 16 km^{2} (6.2 sq mi) in area, in 1999 it reduced to 11 km^{2} (4.2 sq mi) and, by 2019, it had shrunk to 8.1 km^{2} (3.1 sq mi). It has lost 64 % of its maximum mapped area. Kaldaklofsjökull, west of Torfajökull, has regressed even more; by 2019, it was 79 % of its past maximum area at only 1.6 km^{2} (0.62 sq mi).

=== Naming ===
According to legend, the glacier is named for Torfi Jónsson í Klofa, an Icelandic historical figure. When the plague arrived in Iceland in 1493, Torfi fled with his family and his belongings into the highlands and settled in a valley surrounded by the glacier.

According to another legend, the glacier is named for Torfi, a farm worker at a nearby farm. Torfi eloped with the farmer's daughter and fled to the glacier.

== See also ==
- Volcanism of Iceland
  - List of volcanic eruptions in Iceland
  - List of volcanoes in Iceland
