= Rail transport in Iceland =

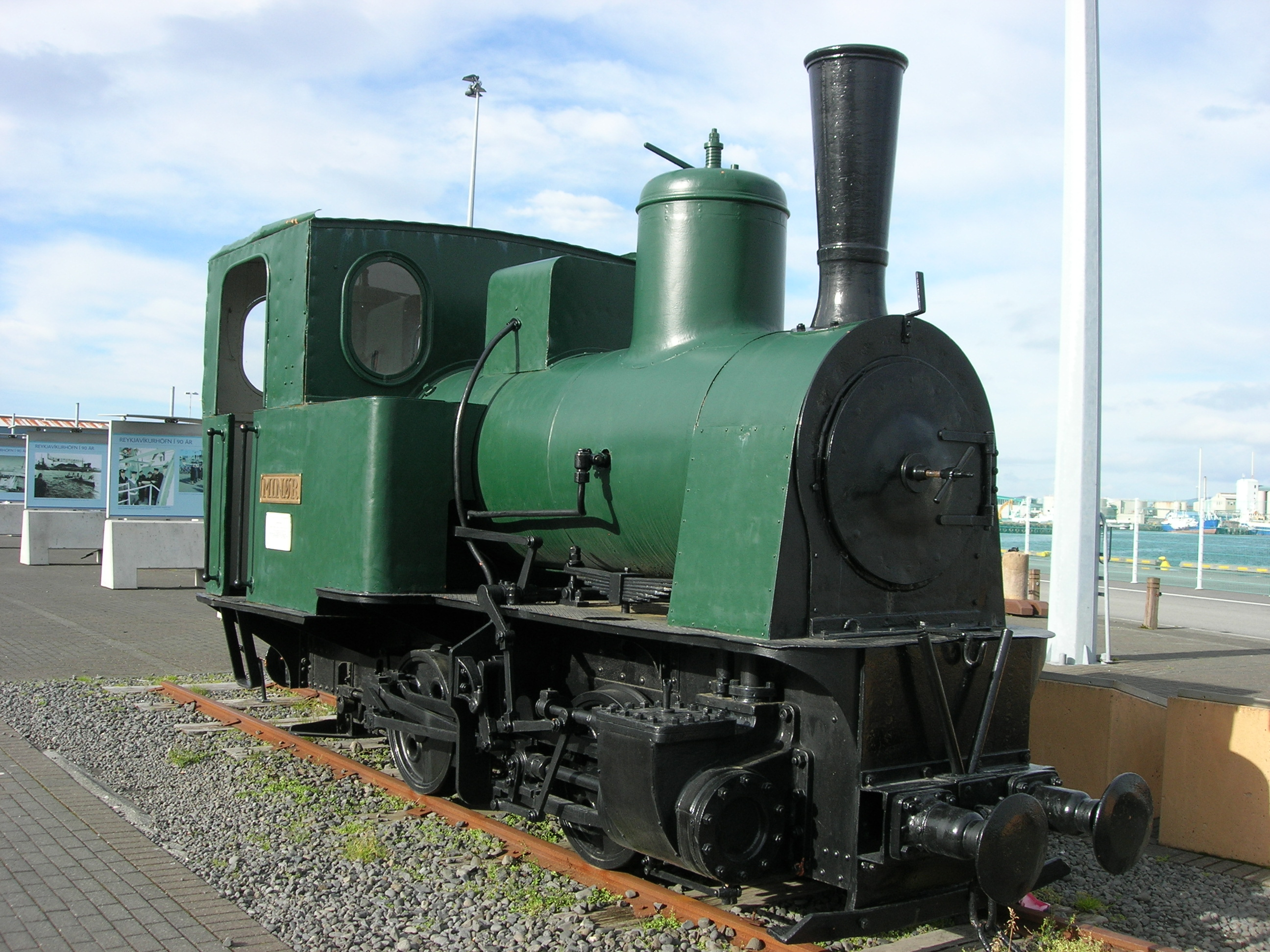
Locomotive Minør as preserved today

Iceland has no railways, although there have been two small locomotive hauled narrow-gauge railways in the past. The main reasons for the lack of railways are the small population outside the capital region and the availability of automobile, bus, and air transportation for inter-city travel.

A 900 mm narrow-gauge railway was used for the construction of the Reykjavík harbour from 1913 to 1928 and was occasionally used for other freight transport during its operation. In the 2000s, a diesel-hauled narrow-gauge railway was used during the construction of the Kárahnjúkar hydropower project.

Several proposals were made for mainline railways in the first half of the 20th century, but none of them proceeded. In the 2010s, there were new proposals for a light railway system in the capital region and an airport rail link to Keflavík.

== Reykjavík Harbour Railway ==
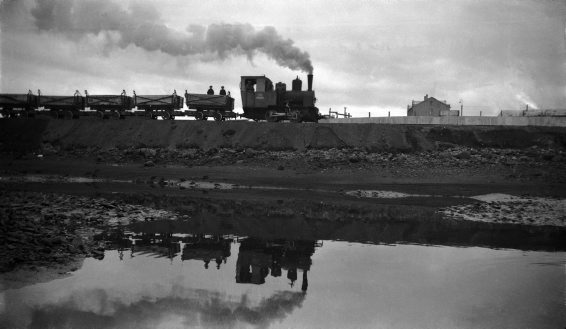
Reykjavík Harbour Railway

The Reykjavík Harbour Railway, of 900 mm (2 ft 11 7/16 in) narrow gauge, built specifically for the construction of the harbour breakwaters, operated intermittently from 1913 until 1928. It hauled rock as landfill material from the Öskjuhlíð quarry site to the harbour. Its first main operation phase was from 1913 to 1917, when the first phase of the harbour was finished. The second period of operation was from 1920 to 1922 when Kolabakki (now Austurbakki) quay was constructed. The third and final period was from 1925 to 1928 when Faxagarður quay was constructed and landfill alongside the shore (where Sæbraut is today).

=== Track network ===
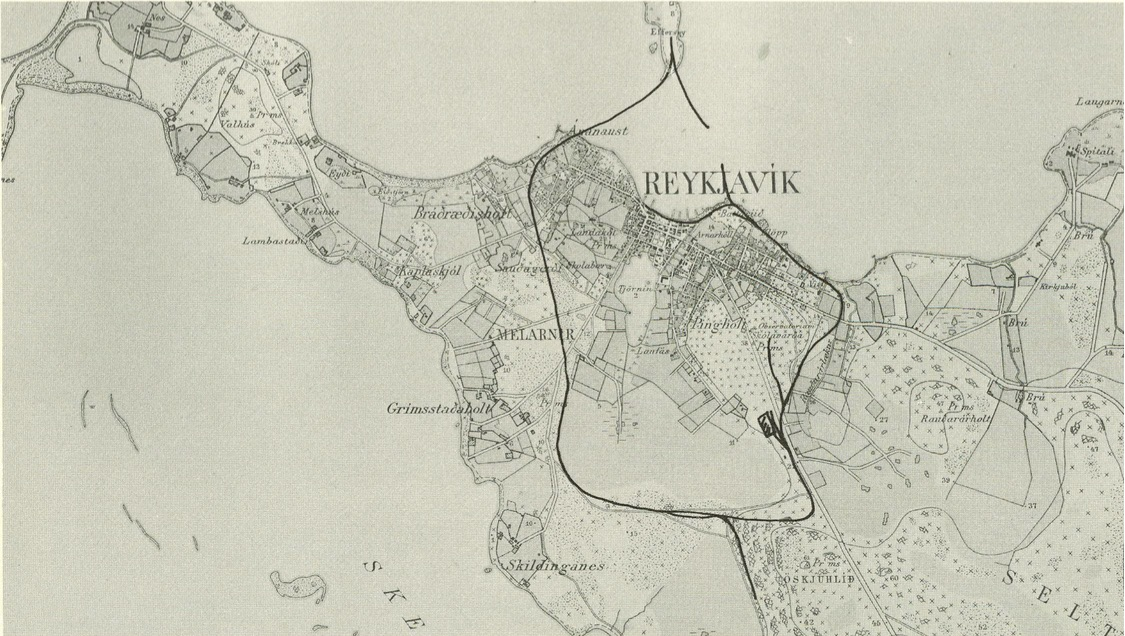
Map of the railway in 1920 by N. P. Kirk

The railway system initially operated a network of around 10 km (6 mi) of track, from a quarry outside the city, Öskjuhlíð, from which it ran a short distance to a junction, passing loop, and sidings. The junction was located just south of a large field which became the Reykjavík city airport. From there, one line ran to the west, around the western edge of the city, before proceeding along the newly constructed western harbour pier to the island of Effersey. A headshunt there allowed trains to reverse along a further line, built out onto the outer harbour wall, and extended as that wall itself grew longer.

From the first junction a second line ran east around farms to a locomotive depot just outside the city, located close to where the National Hospital, Landspítali, is today. The railway was extended in 1920, when the second phase of the harbour was constructed. The 1.5 km (0.9 mi) extension from the depot was constructed, which ran on to a further junction where a short branch line led into a secondary quarrying site. The main line continued to a further junction on the edge of the docks. From there, one line ran along the quayside Kolabakki (where one of the locomotives is today preserved on display, by Austurhöfn), whilst the other ran out along the eastern harbour wall.

The final size of the network was approximately 12 km (7.5 mi) with a gauge of 900 mm (2 ft 11 7/16 in) narrow gauge and a rail weight of 22.5 kg/m (45 lb/yd). The steepest sections were 1:40 gradient and the tightest curves had a radius of 55 m (60 yd).

The last remains of railway track were dismantled in 1940–1945 after the British invasion of Iceland and Allied occupation of Iceland during the construction of Reykjavík Airport. Today none of the track remains.

=== Rolling stock ===
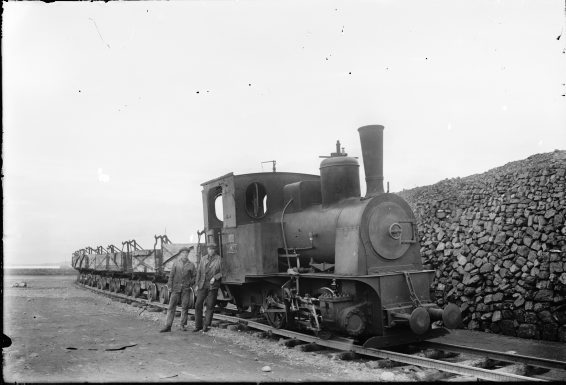
Pioner in 1925

The railway was operated by two steam locomotives built by the Arnold Jung Lokomotivfabrik of Germany, both of which have been preserved. Built in the 1890s in Germany, they worked briefly in Denmark before being imported to Iceland in 1913 for the harbour railway project. Locomotive Pioner is now a static exhibit at the Icelandic Folk Museum at Arbær, whilst locomotive Minør, after many years of storage in a Nissen hut under piles of rubbish, is now an open-air static exhibit in Reykjavík. A scale model of part of the railway, showing one of the locomotives at work, is displayed in the Reykjavík Maritime Museum. Minør was the first to be withdrawn, whilst Pioner (which had received a replacement boiler in 1910 to extend its life) continued to operate until the railway closed in 1928.

The typical operation used a rake was 20 wagons with around 7 to 8 trips a day on the western branch and 17 trips a day on the eastern branch. The locomotives had an operating pressure of 180 psi (1.2 MPa) and a power of around 150 hp (110 kW). The locomotives ran at a maximum of 50 km/h (31 mph).

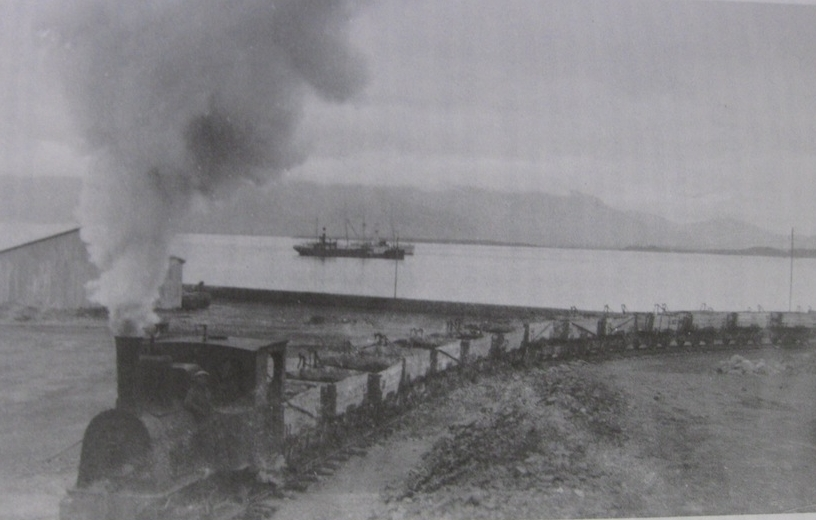
Pioner hauling wagons at the Reykjavik harbour

The main vehicles on the railway was a fleet of 60 four-wheeled open wagons. Two types of wagons were operated, one for large boulders and another for sand with fully-opening sides for loading and unloading. The wagons were not outfitted with brakes. Some of the wagons were modified and outfitted with rudimentary benches to transport workers and dignitaries for some press events, regular passenger transport was prohibited for safety reasons.

=== Incidents ===
Records at the Árbær Museum show that both locomotives were involved in accidents between the two world wars. Iceland's first railway accident was in 1913 when a large boulder being unloaded from a wagon stuck supports on a wooden truss bridge, derailing Minør and causing two workers to be injured, one seriously. This incident was later found to have been caused by rotten wooden sleepers supporting that section of track. Pioner was deliberately derailed by vandals, who placed a chain across the track and weighted down its two sides with rocks. They later claimed that they were testing the locomotive's performance, because it had already survived their previous experiments of placing coins and planks on the track.

In 1916, a five-year-old girl, Guðlaug Eiríksdóttir, was struck by a train by the harbour and was seriously injured. She succumbed to her injuries the following day in hospital. It is the first railway-related death in Iceland. A second fatal accident occurred in 1919, when two toddlers were playing on the tracks. The conductor saw them and applied full braking power and whistled. Seeing no reaction, an engineer jumped from the train, ran ahead and grabbed one of the toddlers off the track. The other toddler was struck by the train. Her name was Guðrún Aðalheiður Elíasdóttir and was aged 3–4 years old.

=== Other uses ===
The Reykjavík Harbour Railway was occasionally used to transport other freight on an ad hoc basis. When the main construction phase of the harbour was completed in 1917 the City of Reykjavík decided to purchase all of the equipment used in its construction, including the railway – presumably to ensure its continued use. Mostly in the years 1914–1918 the harbour railway was used to transport:

- Oil drums from the new quay at Örfisey (where Reykjavík's oil terminal still stands today) into the city centre;
- Meat for export from the Sláturfélag Suðurlands meat processing plant at Skúlagata to the harbour;
- Timber and aggregate for building construction in the city centre; and
- Coal from the harbour to local distributors.

The railway was again used for other purposes in 1926 during the construction of Landspítali when cement and aggregate was transported from the harbour and one of the quarries.

=== Closure and later use of trackwork ===
The Reykjavík Harbour Railway was closed in 1928. Both locomotives were retained but the trackwork was removed and ended up in various other uses in Iceland. All of the wagons were sold to Poland when the operations of the railway ceased.

In the 1930s some of the rails were reused by a farmer in a cave in Hella to transport hay to and from the cave using a cable hauled wagon. The cave has ancient origins but since 19th century had been used for hay storage. The use of the cave as storage ceased in 1975, but the rails are visible at the Caves of Hella museum.

In 1939, trackwork from the Reykjavík Harbour Railway was transported to Dalvík and were used for the construction its harbour. New wagons were made and an imported diesel locomotive was used to construct the harbour.

== Kárahnjúkar TBM railway ==
A diesel-operated TBM railway was in use from 2004 to 2008 in connection with the construction of the Kárahnjúkar hydro-electric power project. The hydropower project required a network of headrace tunnels from the reservoirs to the water turbines. The tunnel network totals 73 km with a diameter of 6 to 7.5 metres. Three tunnel boring machines were used to dig out the tunnels, each of which had an associated tunnel railway to transport workers, equipment, cement and spoil material. The maximum speed of the trains was 25 km/h.

In 2004, two trains collided on the railway resulting in three workers sustaining injuries, which was Iceland's first train collision. Train collisions also occurred in 2005 with two injuries and 2006 with three injuries.

The three train sets consisted of white coloured locomotive and wagons, built by Schöma of Germany. The lifespan of the railway was limited to the construction period of the project. Much of the equipment used was leased from Schöma Lokomotiven of Germany and was returned at the end of the project. One locomotive was gifted to the local municipality and stands outside on display by the Végarður campsite in Fljótsdalur.

== Mainline railway proposals in the 1900s ==
=== First proposals ===
The first official proposals for railways in Iceland were made in 1906. The route would have run from Reykjavík to Selfoss via Þingvallavatn. That route would allow extensions to Akranes/Borgarfjörður, Rangarvöllur. Surveys were made in the summer at the instigation of the Prime Minister, Hannes Hafstein. Over the next few years, engineer Jón Þorláksson conducted more surveys in regard to snowfall, and developed cost estimates, including a comparison between the cost of oil- and coal-powered systems.

In 1918, to stimulate employment, the Icelandic Government began a project, Atvinnubótavegurinn, to construct a right of way from Hafnarfjörður towards Reykjavík. The right of way, constructed as an 8 metre wide embankment, was envisaged to eventually become a railway. The project was abandoned shortly later. A 420 metre long section survives in Garðabær.

=== Proposals in the 1920s ===
In 1921, Alþingi decided to look at the possibility of railways again. Subsequently, in 1922–1923, a Danish engineer made surveys of a route from Reykjavík to Selfoss via Þrengsli. It was the shortest and cheapest solution. The route was envisioned to carry both passengers and freight, which would have been cheaper than existing methods of transportation. In 1927, the city development plan of Reykjavík included a railway terminus with multiple platforms, just outside the Reykjavík city centre in Norðurmýri. Automobile traffic was rising and there was a need for better roads. Comparisons were made between a road and rail system in Iceland, and it was eventually determined that roads would take priority. In 1931, plans for railways in Iceland were abandoned.

== Other rail transport ==
Hand-shunted or cable-hauled rail transport was also used in the past for small scale transport for fishing, farming and military purposes. Active and abandoned patent slips (marine railways) are also present in many harbours and coasts. None of the systems used locomotives but some were cable hauled.

=== Agricultural and fishing use ===
In 1900 a fish drying factory was established at Kirkjusandur, Reykjavík which included around 500 metres of railway to transport fish around using hand wagons. It was dismantled in the 1920s.

In Siglufjörður, herring was transported using wagons on rails placed along quays to fish processing plants from the 1920s until 1942. A similar system was in place at the herring factory at Dagverðareyri in Eyjafjörður, in Ísafjörður and Stykkishólmur.

An industrial dairy farm in use in the 1930s, Korpúlfsstaðir, used wagons pushed along 600 mm (1 ft 11 5/8 in) rails to distribute hay to feeding pens indoors. Another example of a small scale hand-shunted railway is at Brydesbúð in Vík was constructed in 1903.

=== Mines ===
A handful of coal mines existed in Iceland in the 20th century which used minecarts and railways to transport coal and spoil material. They were small scale operations and were hand-shunted. One such example is located at Tindur in Skarðsströnd, in use from 1940 to 1956. Another example is the Stálfjallsnáma mine, in use from 1916 to 1918.

=== Military ===
In 1943, the British Royal Navy constructed a radar station at Darri, a mountain plateau near Aðalvík in the Westfjords. As a part of its operation and construction, a cable railway (funicular) was constructed up the steepest part of the mountain to transport supplies, equipment and vehicles. 50 soldiers worked at the radar station at its peak. Local labour from Aðalvík was also used in the construction of the railway. A crane was used to load the wagons, which were then cable hauled to the top. The railway ran for a length of around 900 metres. From the top of the cable railway, there was a 2 km road to the radar station. At the end of WWII, the radar station was mostly demolished and the railway was completely removed, but the abandoned right of way remains.

Light railways were also used to construct airfields during WWII, including Reykjavík Airport in the early 1940s by the British Army. They were dismantled after construction, but in 2022 some remains were found. Similar a similar railway was used during the construction of Keflavík Airport.

== Recently proposed railways ==
=== Reykjavík–Keflavík ===
There have been intermittent proposals for a passenger railway from Reykjavík to Keflavík International Airport, first in the early 2000s. In 2003, the idea of an airport railway was dropped and a dual carriageway road (Route 41) was built instead, opening in 2008.

More recently, a private group has been looking into the idea of an airport railway. In 2014, a feasibility study was undertaken by Ráðgjöf og verkefnastjórnun, which declared that a high speed airport railway would be feasible with the increasing numbers of tourists coming to Iceland, and passenger numbers at Keflavík International Airport. The project has begun looking for funding and has had talks with the local municipalities about the planning and alignment of the railway.

The electrified railway would run double tracked from the airport, roughly parallel to the current road, and would then be in tunnels from Hafnarfjörður, with a terminal at Reykjavík's main bus station BSÍ. The construction would be 49 km (30 mi) above ground and 14 km (8.7 mi) in tunnels. The maximum operating speed would be 250 km/h (160 mph) and the journey would take 15 minutes. In 2015, "Fluglestin Þróunarfélag ehf." was created, with the intention of acquiring funding for the project and planning. The proposed English name for the project is "Lava Express". It was initially planned for construction to start in 2020.

In 2019, all municipalities the rail line would pass through, except Hafnarfjörður, had approved a cooperation agreement on zoning related to the project, with the newspaper Morgunblaðið reporting that a meeting with the mayor of Hafnarfjörður had been scheduled. Due to the impact of COVID-19 pandemic on Iceland's tourism industry, the project was put on hold for a few years, however little progress had been made in the years before.

In May 2023, Fluglestin þróunarfélag announced plans to revisit the project citing interest from European rail operators as well as Chinese and Japanese contractors in financing and constructing the project. The current plans are unchanged, however the Reykjavík terminal may be scaled back to Kringlan about 2.5–3.5 kilometres (1.6–2.2 mi) east of the BSI Bus terminal (where the current airport buses terminate). The project would have three stations:

- Keflavik International Airport
- Southern Capital Region stop in Kópavogur or Hafnarfjörður - (likely Smáralind shopping centre/mall)
- BSÍ bus terminal (Reykjavík city centre) or Kringlan shopping centre

=== Within the Capital Region ===
There have also been serious proposals for a light rail system for the Capital Region (Reykjavík, Kópavogur, Hafnafjörður). In the Samtök Sveitarfélaga á Höfuðborgarsvæðinu (Association of municipalities in the Capital Region) master plan for the capital region, Höfuðborgarsvæðið 2040, the transport section outlines a plan to create a light rail/Bus rapid transit (BRT) system in the Capital Region. In 2019, a funding package was agreed between the central government and municipalities in the Capital Region on the construction of the BRT option. As of 2026, the first phase of the BRT system set for completion in 2031, is from Reykjavík city centre to Hamraborg in Kópavogur. The second phase is from the city centre to Ártúnshöfði in eastern Reykjavík, to be complete in 2035. Later phases are still in planning, but a network spanning the greater Capital Region is to be constructed in phases. There are currently no official plans for light rail in the Capital Region.

== See also ==
- Transport in Iceland
