= 900 mm gauge railways =

Railway track gauge

900 mm (2 ft 11 7/16 in) narrow-gauge railways are generally found in Europe. This gauge is mostly used for light urban rail networks, industrial and agricultural railways.

== Railways ==
Country/territory	Railway
Australia	Yallourn 900 mm railway (defunct)
Austria	Linz urban tramways; Florianerbahn; Pöstlingbergbahn (converted in 2009 from 1,000 mm or 3 ft 3 3/8 in metre gauge)
Denmark	See Narrow-gauge railways in Denmark
Estonia	Vaivara–Viivikonna mine railway (converted to 1,435 mm or 4 ft 8 1/2 in standard gauge, then converted to 1,520 mm (4 ft 11 27/32 in) Russian gauge)
Finland	Rokua railway
Georgia	Borjomi–Bakuriani railway "Kukushka" (not operational since 2022, with plans of rehabilitation); New Athos Cave Railway (operating)
Germany	Mecklenburgische Bäderbahn; Dagebüll–Oland–Langeneß island railway; Borkumer Kleinbahn, Isle of Borkum
Guernsey	1941–1946
Iceland	Reykjavík Harbour Railway (defunct)
Indonesia	Used by Rendeng sugar mill for sugar cane transport
Ireland	Cork Electric Tramways and Lighting Company; opened 1898, closed 1931
Norway	Used by the Germans up to 1945, called Feldbahn (field railway), for industrial plants or other temporary uses. In Norway during the WW II the Germans built a 15 km (9.3 mi) railway between the harbour at Årdalstangen and the industrial plant of Øvre Årda. It closed in 1959, by then used only at the iron works. One steam locomotive was lost into the sea, but was found by divers around 1990 and is restored and exhibited at Aardalstangen.
Poland	Trams in Kraków (converted to 1,435 mm or 4 ft 8 1/2 in standard gauge)
Portugal	Lisbon funiculars (from 1913) and tramways (from 1901) and their preceding mule cars (regauged in 1888–1894 from 1,435 mm or 4 ft 8 1/2 in standard gauge); Braga tramways (1914–1963); Linha do Porto à Póvoa e Famalicão and its branch lines (Leixões and São Gens), built in 1871–1893 and regauged to 1,000 mm (3 ft 3 3/8 in) metre gauge in 1930
United States	Detroit Downtown Trolley (defunct)

In Sweden, there was an extensive network of railways with 891 mm (2 ft 11 3/32 in) track, some of them remain. This close enough to 900 mm (2 ft 11 7/16 in) that they are more or less compatible, and some sales of rolling stock between the gauges have taken place.

== See also ==
- List of track gauges
