= Guernsey Railway =

Closed tramway on Guernsey

Coordinates: 49.459°N 2.535°W

Guernsey Railway Company
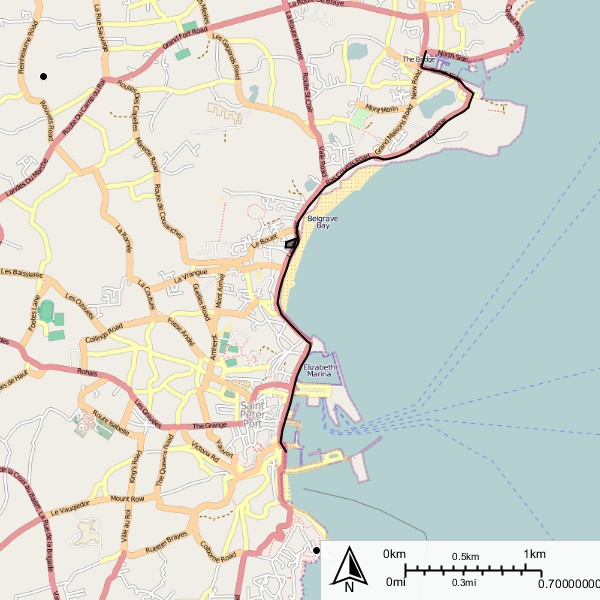
- Map of the Guernsey Railway Company route.

Operation
- Locale: Guernsey
- Open: 1892
- Close: 1934
- Status: Closed

Infrastructure
- Track gauge: 1,435 mm (4 ft 8 1/2 in)
- Propulsion system: Electric

Statistics
- Route length: 3 miles (4.8 km)
Guernsey Steam Tramway Company era: 1879–1892
- Track gauge: 1,435 mm (4 ft 8 1/2 in)
- Propulsion system: Steam
Guernsey Railway Company era: 1892–1934
- Track gauge: 1,435 mm (4 ft 8 1/2 in)
- Propulsion system: Electric

The Guernsey Railway opened as the Guernsey Steam Tramway on 6 June 1879 with two steam tram engines, more being added later. It was later converted to an electric tramway, which began working on 20 February 1892. The system closed on 9 June 1934. This leaves Alderney as the only Channel Island with a working railway.

== Guernsey Steam Tramway Company ==
The Guernsey Steam Tramway Company was registered in London on 29 May 1878, the concession having been granted by the States of Guernsey on 2 May 1877, and confirmed by an Order in Council of 13 August 1877.

The line extended for about three miles from Saint Peter Port, the principal town, to Saint Sampson's, a smaller port which at that time had extensive granite quarries. The line was single track with passing loops, and a maximum gradient of 1 in 32.

The contract for construction was awarded to John Howard F.R.G.S, and the value was a little over £4,000 per mile (equal to £429,751 today).

The first Merryweather steam engine and carriage arrived only on 4 June on the S.S. Stannington. This remained the situation for the first four weeks of operation and restricted the receipts. By the week ending 23 August, William Gumbley, the manager, reported 6,780 passengers with total receipts of £67 1s 10d.

Two further Merryweather steam tram engines were delivered at a cost of £700 each (equal to £75,206 today).

Before it could open, the system was examined by Major General Charles Scrope Hutchinson of Inspector of Railways for the Board of Trade in the company of Mr Yockney C.E., the company engineer, John Howard F.R.G.S., the contractor, and Mr. Duqeumin, the State Surveyor, and permission was granted to operate the service with two conditions:

1. The rate of speed shall not exceed 4 miles per hour upon the rails which have been temporarily laid between the Piette and the Salirie, and at the curve near the house called Radford's Coffee House, near the corner of the Bouët Road
2. A watchman shall be stationed until further notice at the corner of the Bouët Road, and at the corner of Radford's house during all the time that the trains are running.

Service commenced on 6 June 1879 and was well received, 2,000 people being carried on the first two days. Trains ran hourly between the harbours, taking 18 minutes for the journey, and consisting of a first class closed car, and a second class open car. Fares were 3d for first class and 2d for second. Each engine ran 72 miles daily.

In 1885 the locomotive stock had increased to its maximum of six, comprising two by Merryweather and four by Hughes of Loughborough. From this time there was a gradual loss of passengers owing to horse-drawn omnibus competition, favoured no doubt by the freedom from noise and smoke. Trams ceased running on 22 January 1889, but service resumed on 2 December 1889 after the company had been reorganised. It was re-registered as the Guernsey Railway Company on 22 September 1889.

=== Statistics ===
- 1880, passengers 319,033, revenue £2,071
- 1885, passengers 416,970, revenue £2,941

=== List of steam tram engines ===
No.	Date built	Builder	Works No.	Wheels	Name	Notes	Withdrawn
1	1879	Merryweather	84	0-4-0	Shooting Star	-	by 1899
2	1879	Merryweather	85	0-4-0	Sampson	-	by 1896
3	1879	Lewin	?	0-4-0	-	-	by 1882
4	1877/8	Hughes	14	0-4-0	-	arr. 1882	by 1890
5	1877/8	Hughes	15	0-4-0	-	arr. 1882/3	by 1889
6	1877/8	Hughes	16	0-4-0	-	arr. 1882/3	by 1889
7	1877/8	Hughes	17	0-4-0	-	arr. 1883	by 1889
8	1879	Hawthorn	1802	0-4-0	Haro	arr. 1890	by 1899

- arr. = date arrived in Guernsey

=== Steam pulled wagons ===
Nos.	Date built	Builder	Notes
1	1879	Starbuck Car and Wagon Company Ltd	Withdrawn 1903
2	1879	Starbuck Car and Wagon Company Ltd	Withdrawn 1902
3	1879	Starbuck Car and Wagon Company Ltd	Destroyed by fire in 1896
4	1879	Starbuck Car and Wagon Company Ltd	Withdrawn 1881 and destroyed by fire in 1896
5	1879	Starbuck Car and Wagon Company Ltd	Withdrawn 1893
6	1879	Starbuck Car and Wagon Company Ltd	Withdrawn 1893
7	1880	possibly Starbuck, Birkenhead	possibly destroyed in fire 1896
8	1881	probably Falcon Engine & Car Works	Withdrawn 1896

== Guernsey Railway Company ==
The line was electrified in 1892 by Siemens, and electric services started on 20 February 1892. Apart from an experimental line in Leeds, it was the first street tramway in the British Isles to be supplied with current from an overhead wire.

Initial services were offered with two cars, power being supplied by a Marshall's semi-portable engine and generator capable of running four cars. The line was run under lease by Siemens until things were running smoothly when in October 1893 the Guernsey Railway Company took over. The Railway Company also bought out the horse-drawn omnibus competition for £3,000 (equal to £333,301 today), plus £1,500 shares. In 1898 the last of the steam trams were sold.

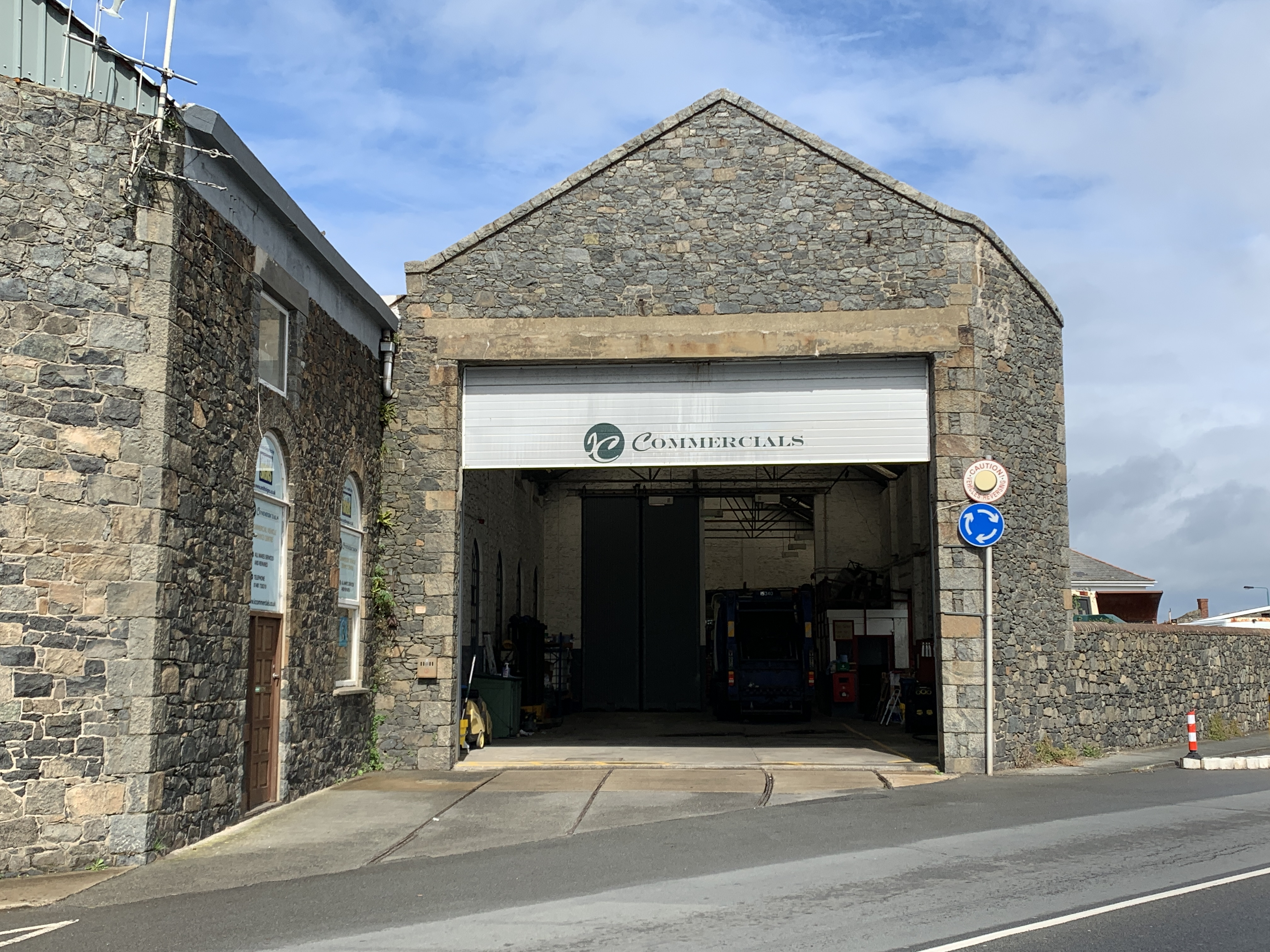
The former depot

The depot was at Hougue à la Perre, and consisted of a shed with three tracks with pits, together with the power house and workshops, all built of stone and brick.

The generating plant comprised two compound steam engines of 25 hp each, and two boilers each fitted with a Friedman injector and a feed water heater, and fed by a Worthington pump. Only one engine was necessary at any one time to produce sufficient power, so they were worked alternatively each fortnight. A Siemens compound-wound central station dynamo was capable of producing 100 amps at 500 volts. The power was supplied to the cars by a trolley wire of 9mm copper, spanned at between 40 and 48 yards about 2 feet outside the track on light bracket arm poles.

For the three months ending 31 December 1893, the usage statistics were as follows:

- Average number of cars running = 8
- Average daily mileage per car = 70
- Average speed in miles per hour = 7.2
- Average pounds of coal consumed per car-mile = 8
- Average number of passengers per car-mile = 7
- Cost of operation per car mile = 5.791d. (equivalent to £2.681 in 2025).

The normal weekday service was 10 minutes. An early car left St. Sampson's at 6.20 am, arriving in town at 6.40. It was driven by the veteran Mr. Dunn, the night cleaner. Six cars were usually used with eight crews, and one more for meal relief. On Sundays, cars commenced running at 1.30 pm. The men had one day off in eight. On holidays and football match days, all the cars and trailers were in use, and were packed solid. During the match they were parked on the siding at Vale Road, when the crews were apparently at liberty to watch the game, so this "split turn" was not unpopular.

In the First World War, 50 of the staff joined up, and six were killed. In 1920 there were further track renewals, a new loop was provided at Bulwer Avenue, and also a new repair shed was constructed.

During the first years of the 1930s, passenger traffic declined from over 1 million per year to less than half that. A financial investigation found that trams cost 9d per mile, whereas buses cost 5½d per mile. Revenues had fallen, and the company had not paid a dividend since 1923.

The last day of service was 9 June 1934. Two days later, track removal commenced, and the sale of tramcar bodies commenced.

=== Statistics ===
- 1912, 143,272 car miles, 914,222 passengers
- 1922, 150,924 car miles, 1,276,913 passengers
- 1932, 163,479 car miles, 783,647 passengers

=== Electric fleet ===
Nos.	Date built	Builder	Notes
1	1905	Brush Electrical & Engineering Co Ltd	
2	1903	Brush Electrical & Engineering Co Ltd	
3	1897	G.F. Milnes & Co.	Withdrawn 1934
4	1890	Falcon Engine & Car Works	
5	1893	Falcon Engine & Car Works	Dismantled 1933
6	1893	Falcon Engine & Car Works	Withdrawn 1934
7	1891	Falcon Engine & Car Works	Withdrawn 1934
8	1896	G.F. Milnes & Co.	Withdrawn 1934
9	1891	Guernsey Railway Company	converted in company workshops from the two steam car trailers
10	1891	Falcon Engine & Car Works	Withdrawn 1934
11	1891	Falcon Engine & Car Works	Withdrawn 1934
12	1895	Falcon Engine & Car Works	Withdrawn 1934
13	1895	Falcon Engine & Car Works	Withdrawn 1934
14	1897	G.F. Milnes & Co.	Withdrawn 1934
15	1897	G.F. Milnes & Co.	Withdrawn 1934
16	1903	Falcon Engine & Car Works in 1893	ex-Cardiff Corporation Tramways, withdrawn 1934
17	1903	possibly Falcon Engine & Car Works	ex-Cardiff Corporation Tramways, withdrawn 1929
18	1903	Falcon Engine & Car Works in 1893	ex-Cardiff Corporation Tramways, withdrawn 1934
19	1903	possibly Falcon Engine & Car Works	Withdrawn 1934

The company livery was maroon and cream.

== Activity since closure ==
Guernsey Railway Co Ltd continued in existence (as a bus operator) until 1980, when its operation was taken over by Guernseybus.

In 2004 there was a plan to run a heritage tram service and restore some original trams to operate it. No further progress has been made.

== See also ==
- List of Channel Islands railways
- Transport in Guernsey
