= The Settlement Exhibition =

Coordinates: 64°08′51″N 21°56′34″W

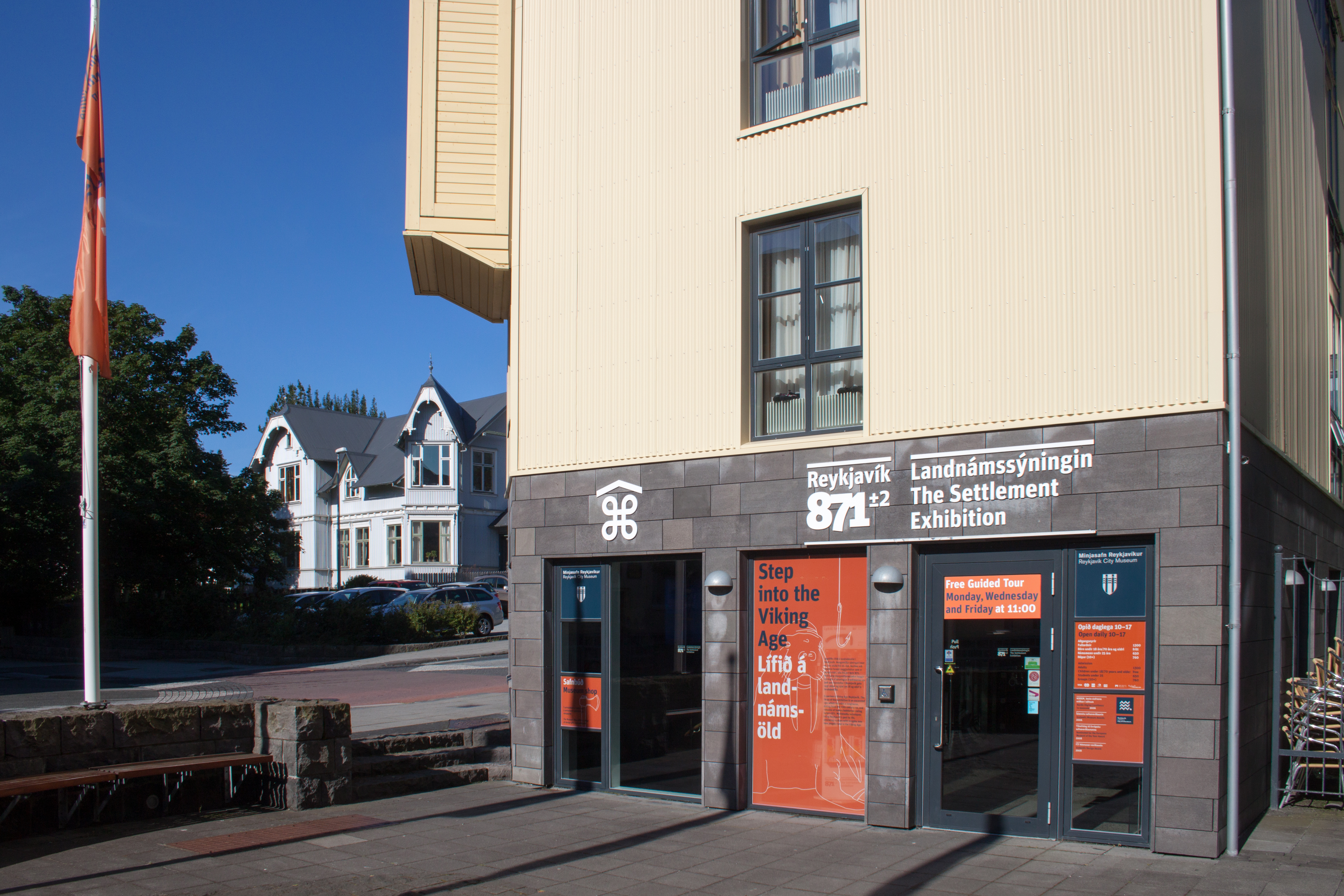
The entry of The Settlement Exhibition Reykjavík 871±2 on Aðalstræti 16 in Reykjavík.

The Settlement Exhibition Reykjavík 871±2 (Icelandic: Landnámssýningin) is an exhibit run the Reykjavík City Museum in Reykjavík, Iceland. It displays the ruins of one of the first known Viking houses in Iceland in its original location, as well as findings from other excavations in the city center. The exhibition is located at 101 Reykjavík, Aðalstræti 16, at the corner of Aðalstræti and Suðurgata.

The focus of the exhibition is the remains of a hall from the Settlement Age, excavated in 2001. The hall was inhabited from c. 930–1000. North of the hall are remnants of a wall that was built around 871 CE, ±2 years, hence the exhibition's name. Such precise dating is possible because a major volcanic eruption from the Torfajökull area spread tephra across the region. The hall is among the oldest human-made structures found in Iceland to this day. Also on display are objects from the Viking Age that were found in central Reykjavík and the island of Viðey.

== History and contents ==
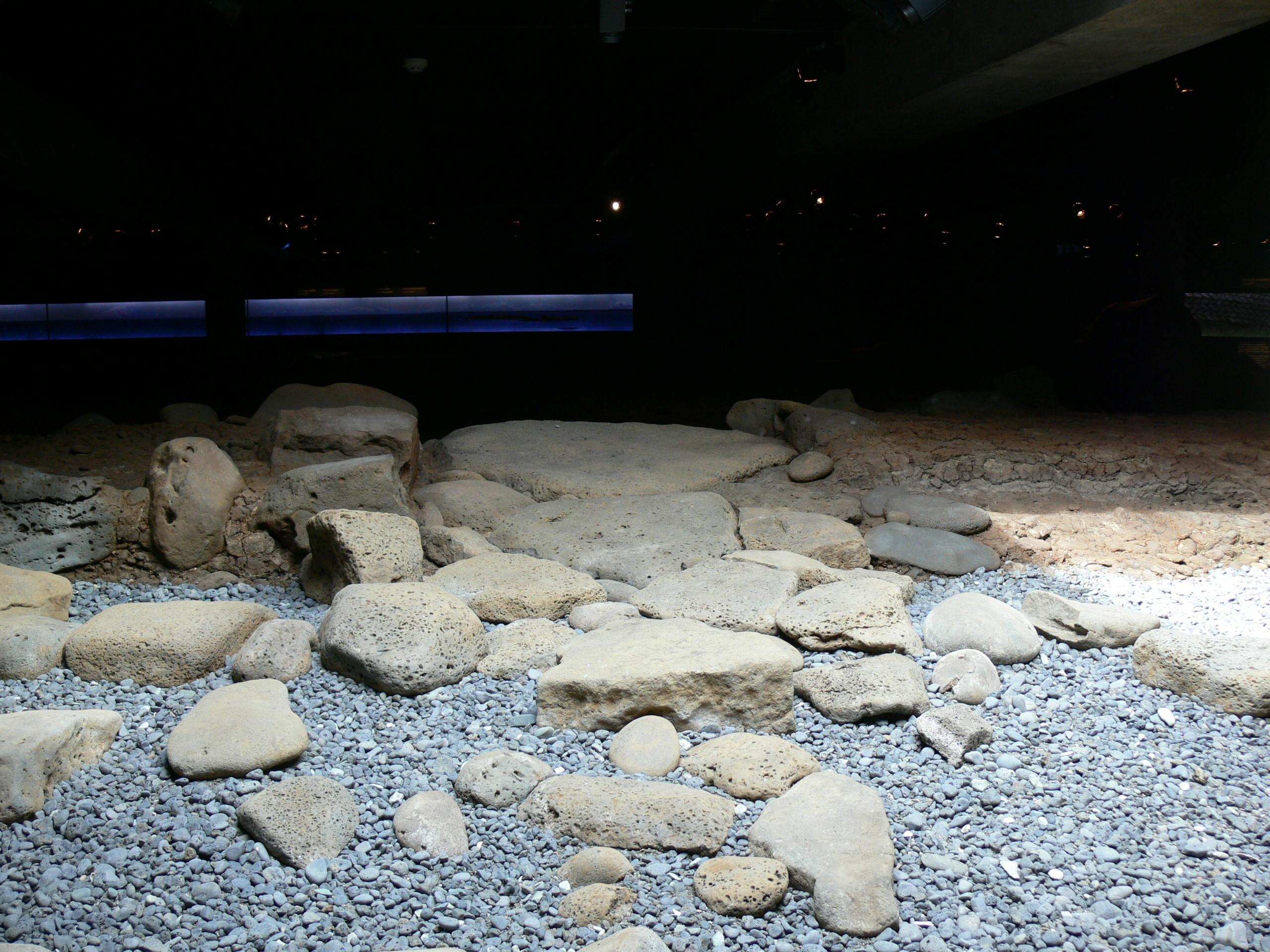
Remains of the longhouse

In 2001, archaeological remains were excavated in Aðalstræti, which turned out to be the oldest evidence of human habitation in Reykjavík, dating to before 871±2 CE. The findings included a hall or a longhouse from the tenth century, which is now preserved in its original location as the focal point of the exhibition about life in Viking Age Reykjavík.

On the south side of Aðalstræti, an old house stood for many years at no. 16, which had fallen into disrepair. On either side were vacant lots, used for parking. Old Reykjavík residents remembered a grand building on the corner of Aðalstræti and Túngata, called Uppsalir. It had been demolished in the 1960s, when the Reykjavík urban plan called for a highway to be built through Grjótaþorp. The building to the north had been torn down long before; it was one of the 18th-century buildings built for the Innréttingar, the woolen workshops that marked the beginning of urban development in Reykjavík. In the summer of 2000, the City of Reykjavík concluded a contract with Minjavernd (antiquities preservation) on the construction of a hotel on the Aðalstræti 14, 16, and 18 lots. The old building at Aðalstræti 16 was to be renovated, and new buildings would be constructed on either side. In 1971–75, archaeological excavations had been carried out on the Aðalstræti 14 and 18 lots, revealing relics from the Settlement Age. It was thus known that further relics could be expected to be found at this location, and that archaeological excavations would be necessary before any development of the land could take place. Consequently, the Reykjavík City Council decided to carry out the excavations and assigned the Director of the Reykjavík City Museum to supervise the project.

Preparation began in the autumn of 2000, when several preliminary trenches were dug on the sites. The Icelandic Institute of Archaeology was appointed to carry out the excavations, which began in January 2001. During the excavation, the remains of a hall were uncovered, and north of it, fragments of turf wall. Further examination revealed that the building was of a type known from the Settlement Age, the Icelandic term for the period 870–930, midway through the Viking Age. The wall fragments were no less important. They were covered by the Settlement layer of tephra, from a volcanic eruption believed to have more-or-less coincided with the beginning of the settlement of Iceland. This indicated that the wall had been built before the tephra was deposited. It transpired that the hall was very well preserved: the walls were in good condition, as was the central hearth. Hence, it was proposed that the hall should be preserved. The find reawakened debate on the beginnings of Reykjavík, on settlers Ingólfur and his wife Hallveig, and the site of the first farmstead. Preliminary ideas for the exhibition and its building were developed. The Reykjavík City Council ultimately determined that the site should be preserved. An exhibition building should be built around it to house an exhibition on the settlement in Reykjavík.

In 2001, the Mayor appointed a group to work on ideas for the conservation and exhibition of the relics. The group consulted with focus groups and six designers; based on their work with them, they submitted their proposals to the Executive City Council in June 2002. Construction work commenced in the autumn of 2003, while the exhibition concepts were further developed. The exhibition 871 ±2 was based on scholars' theories about what the heritage sites in central Reykjavík can tell us about the life and work of the first settlers. The City of Reykjavík had previously carried out archaeological excavations in central Reykjavík. In 1971–75, excavations were conducted on Aðalstræti and Suðurgata; the project marked the 1100th anniversary of Iceland's settlement. The Reykjavík City Museum has followed up on these studies as opportunities have arisen, generally in connection with construction or roadworks in the city center, and has carried out small-scale excavations. Examples include excavations at Suðurgata 7 and Aðalstræti 8, and elsewhere on Aðalstræti, for instance, the present Ingólfstorg square, and on the Parliament House site when a car park was constructed there. Gradually, a quite clear picture of the early settlement in the Kvos area has emerged. In 1986–94, extensive excavations were carried out on the offshore island of Viðey, which added yet more to knowledge of the early history of Reykjavík.

The traditional story of the settler Ingólfur Arnarson, and how he chose a place to live, is familiar to every Icelander. Much importance has been attached to the accounts of the settlers in the Book of Settlements and Book of Icelanders; for a long time, the aim was to verify the traditions by locating Ingólfur's home. The discovery of the historical relics at Aðalstræti confirms that written sources and archaeology are broadly consistent, and that Norse settlers came to Iceland at around the time stated in Old Icelandic writings.

It also confirms that during the early years of habitation in Reykjavík, people did indeed live where tradition says they did, at the south of Kvos, the gravel ridge that divides the Lake from the sea. But archaeology cannot tell us the names of the inhabitants. The settlement exhibition Reykjavík 871 ±2 is the result of work by many people: those who excavated the site, those who built the exhibition space, those who came up with ideas for the exhibition, and those who developed them.

Advice has been sought from many quarters. When the idea of preserving the site arose, it was suggested that it might be possible to conserve it indoors, and foreign conservation specialists were consulted. A visit by the managing director and a board member of ICOMOS (International Council of Monuments and Sites) to Reykjavík provided an opportunity to discuss the significance of the finds and the possibility of conserving them. Relics are exhibited 'in situ' in various museums and exhibitions; being seen in their original locations gives them special significance. They are tangible evidence that "this is the place" - in this case, the place where habitation at Reykjavík began.

The project has called for collaboration between scholars and specialists in many fields: archaeologists, conservators, natural scientists and historians, museum staff, architects, designers, engineers, technicians, artisans, politicians and officials. The exhibition Reykjavík 871 ±2 brings together historic relics and modern technology, which is used to make the site accessible and explain the historical context of Reykjavík since the settlement. This exhibition was designed to stimulate yet more interest in the history and culture of Reykjavík, among both Reykjavík people themselves and visitors to the city.

=== Why 871±2? ===
The title 'The Settlement Exhibition Reykjavík 871±2' was chosen for the exhibition: a layer of tephra was deposited around 871 AD from an eruption in the Torfajökull area, about 400 km to the east. The layer, which was deposited across Iceland, was dated to 871, with a possible error of 2 years either way. The layer can be dated with this degree of accuracy by reference to ice layers drilled from the Greenland Glacier, as the tephra was also deposited there. The tephra layer has proved a boon to archaeologists and plays a crucial role in dating finds from the early years of Reykjavík's history. The title of the exhibition is intended to underscore the scientific approach applied.

=== Development ===
Several factors from the start circumscribed the exhibition. It had been decided that a hotel would be constructed on the site, and, hence, the relics were to be preserved and exhibited in a basement beneath the new building. Clearly, there was a risk that a basement exhibition space would prove unsuitable. Hence, importance was placed on making it interesting and drawing visitors' attention away from anything that might remind them of an ordinary basement. Thus, a dark-blue oval exhibition wall was constructed around the hall, sloping slightly inwards or outwards. A photograph was set into the wall, showing the view in all directions from Reykjavík, as it is believed to have been at the time of the settlement. A lighted strip is also set into the wall at the level of the surface where the tephra layer fell.

The hall was built on a gravel ridge between the sea and the Lake. Conditions required excavating the floor of the exhibition space below the surface of the gravel ridge on which the hall stood. The idea of the gravel ridge is preserved by the floor being partly sea-washed shingle, and gently undulating.

A working party of scholars was convened to discuss the exhibition's content. Their discussions led to the basic policy that the exhibition should focus on cultural relics and their research, while the settlement myth would be briefly recounted before visitors entered the exhibition proper and in a computer centre accessible to visitors. The distinction between historical sources and the archaeological excavation was to be clearly drawn.

The content of the exhibition was to be presented in as diverse a manner as possible, emphasizing the approach's entertainment value without sacrificing too much scholarly rigor. The exhibits are, of course, the main point, but interpretations and explanations were to be presented in interactive multimedia form, combined with a variety of more conventional exhibition techniques. An exhibition is, by its nature, primarily a visual experience, but senses of hearing and smell can intensify and diversify the experience; hence, experts in these fields of human perception were invited to participate.

== The exhibition ==
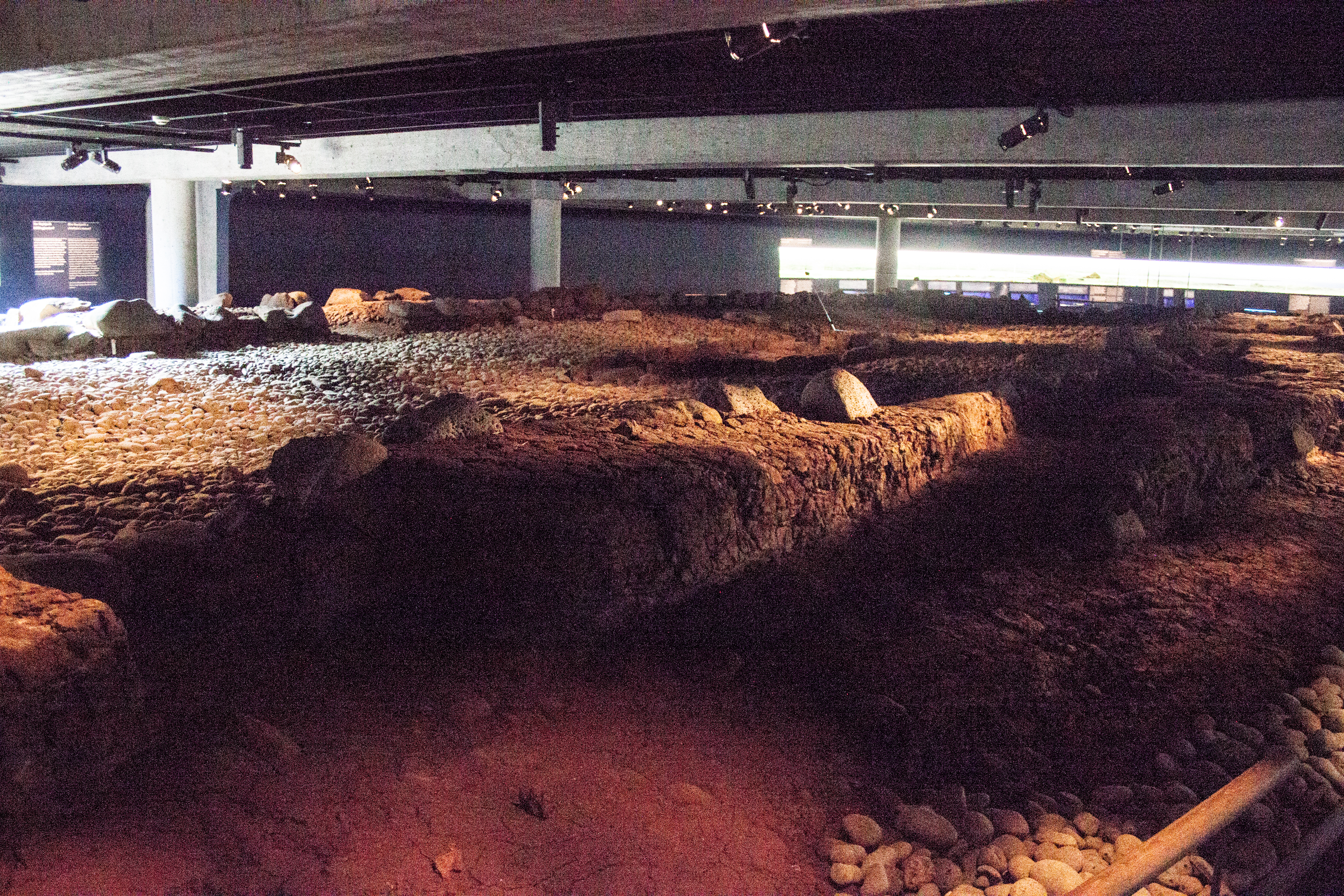
General view of the excavated house, with the fireplace in the middle

'The Settlement Exhibition Reykjavík 871±2' focuses on archaeological finds from the earliest period of habitation in Reykjavík and on scholarly research into them. A well-preserved Viking-Age hall was unearthed here, along with fragments of wall structures, some of the oldest evidence of human habitation in Iceland. These archaeological relics are important in themselves, but what made the find so remarkable, and led to the conservation and display of the site, is that the structures were found at the very place where, according to written sources, the first settler in Iceland made his home.

These sources, Íslendingabók (the Book of Icelanders) and Landnámabók (the Book of Settlements), were written down in the 12th century, some time after the events they describe; there is a consensus among scholars that the Book of Icelanders is more reliable as a source on the settlement. Many of the Sagas of Icelanders, written down in the 13th-14th centuries, also recount events from the Settlement Age. Still, these are today deemed largely fictional, though their value is recognized as evidence of the society and circumstances of their writers, and of their conceptions of the Settlement Age.

From these writings, a myth evolved about the dawn of Icelandic history, which played a major role in Icelanders' campaign for independence in the 19th century and has retained its iconic value for the nation ever since.

Archaeological research on structures and other relics from the early years of Icelandic history is of a different nature. Archaeology aims to examine the object of study, analyze it by all available means, and glean as much as possible from it about the society and individuals who left the relics. Archaeological methods have advanced enormously over the past century since such research began in Iceland. Today's archaeologists apply a variety of high-tech scientific approaches to uncover the secrets of the smallest traces found. Their methods are not unlike those of forensic scientists, familiar to us from TV and film, who can extract vital evidence of past events from traces invisible to the naked eye.

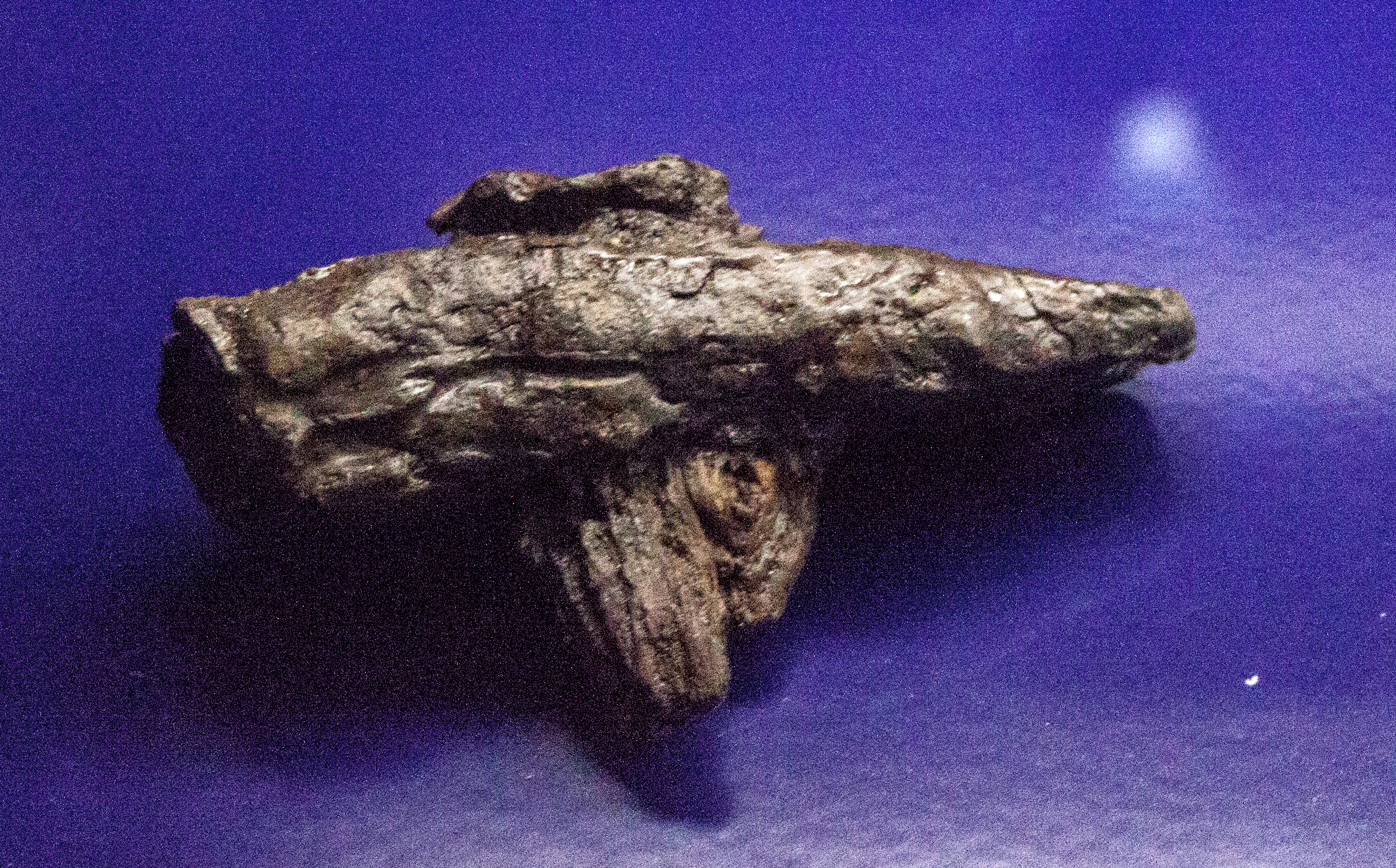
A hammer found on the site

Archaeological finds from the Settlement Age cast light on the people who lived here, their way of life, and society. But such research will never make a major contribution to resolving the debate over the source value of the Books of Icelanders and Settlements; however, this ongoing debate may, in itself, be seen as part of the iconic image, with its own symbolic value.

=== The longhouse ===
The outer walls of the house were made of turf pieces, known as strengur, with some stone added at their bases. The roof was also of turf. Two roof posts supported the roof, but the walls must have also carried some of its weight. This is unusual for a dwelling of this period, where the weight of the roof was generally borne by posts and other internal timbers. Intriguingly, under the western wall is the spine of a horse or cow and other bones. In the middle of the house was a fireplace, one of the largest ever found in Iceland. Most of the house had a trampled earthen floor. Only a small area of the western part of the house had a timber floor or platform, called a bench or set. This would have been the householders' personal space and sleeping area, perhaps with enclosed cabins.

=== Principal points ===
The focus of the exhibition is the hall, where various methods are employed to explain and interpret the building's remains. The most interesting objects from the excavations are displayed in glass cabinets recessed into the oval wall below the landscape photograph. They have been placed there in accordance with their links to nature; various methods are employed to point out and explain these links.

The hall itself is as it was when the archaeologists had finished their work. Guests are supposed to walk around it anti-clockwise; on the way, they will see various explanatory information about the structure. Beams of light that illuminate when a button is pressed highlight the most important factors.

Otherwise, information about the hall site is mainly provided by two innovative multimedia tools: the Reconstruction Window and two multimedia tables.

A hands-on children's area is also part of the exhibition, featuring replicas of Viking Age toys, ancient boardgames, and other activities.

== Methods ==
Various methods are employed to explain and interpret the building's remains. These include creating a three-dimensional image of what the hall may have looked like. Building techniques are also explained. On the multimedia table is a large model of the hall, with information on the archaeologists' research findings and methods, the hall as it was, and the life and work that went on there. A second multimedia table provides information about daily activities such as ironwork and carpentry, along with findings from a later excavation across the street that concluded in 2011. Two touch-screens give information about cultural affinities between different North Atlantic nations, in addition to the Vikings' expansion and how they settled new countries.

== Awards ==
The exhibition has won two awards so far: The Icelandic Museum Award 2006 and the NODEM Award 06. (Nordic Digital Excellence in Museums.)
