= Transport in Guernsey =

Guernsey is the second largest of the Channel Islands. It is part of the Common Travel Area, allowing passport-free travel to and from the United Kingdom, Jersey, the Isle of Man, or Ireland. Travel to the Schengen Area of Europe requires a passport or an EU national identity document and from 2025, entry to the Schengen Area will require compliance with the European Travel Information and Authorisation System (ETIAS) and non-EU citizens may need a visa. Entry from the Schengen Area requires a passport, except when a concession is in place for short trips to Guernsey, when an EU ID card is acceptable.

This article includes various references to Alderney, Herm and Sark, which are part of the Bailiwick of Guernsey.

== Road ==
Road transport is the primary form of both private and public transport in Guernsey.

=== Main roads and lanes ===
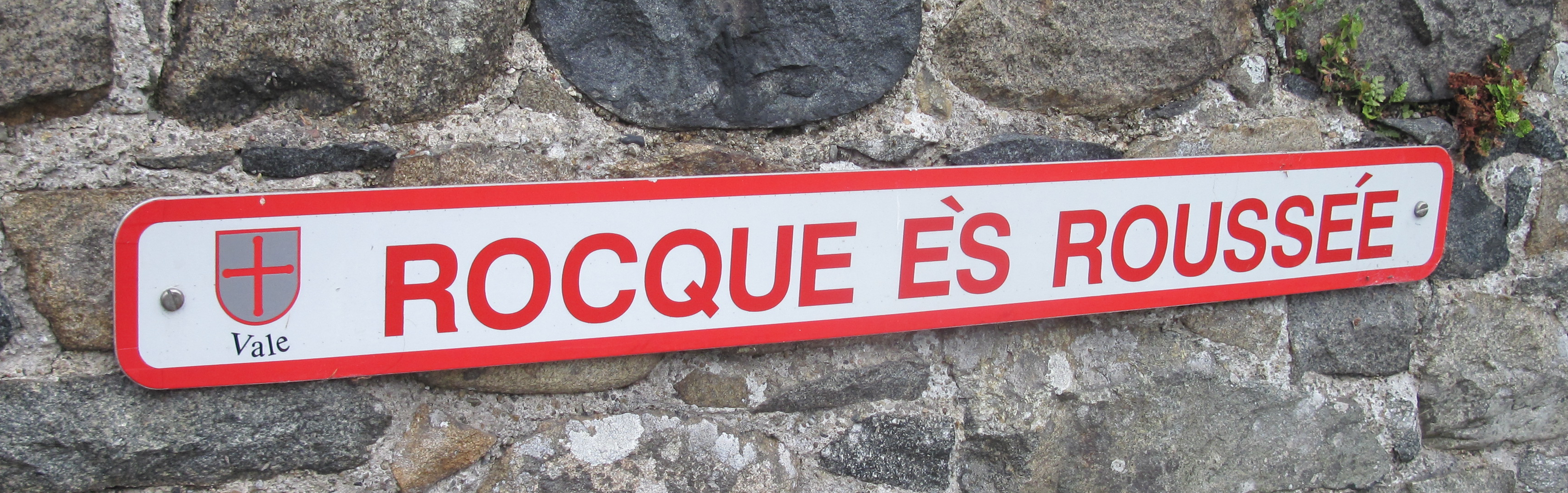
Road names in Guernsey are generally in French or Guernésiais

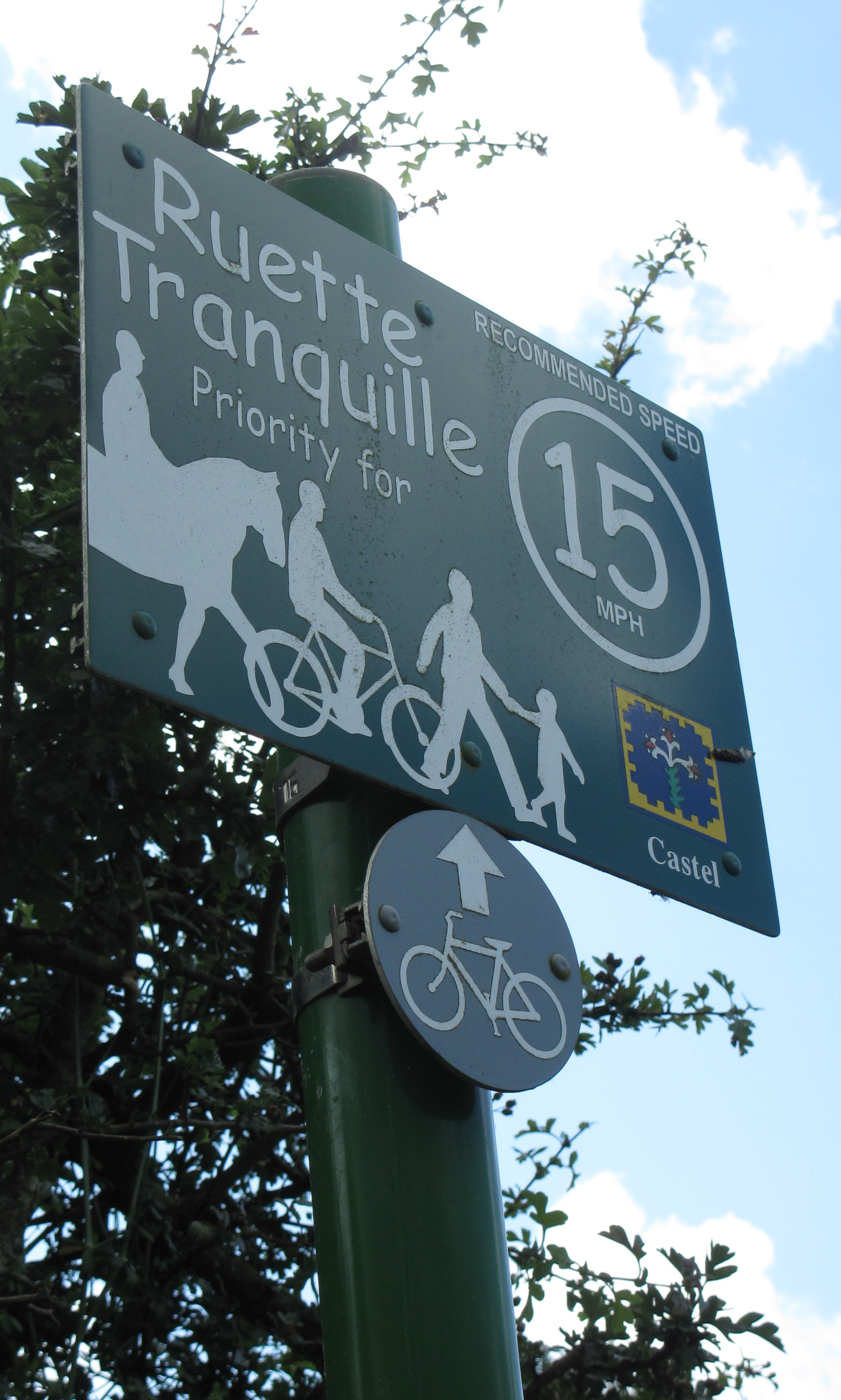
A Ruette Tranquille sign

Traffic in Guernsey drives on the left. Roads are generally narrow, with an all-island speed limit of 35 miles per hour (56 km/h); however, lower speed limits apply on certain roads. There are seasonal speed limit changes that see the speed limit of 35 miles per hour reduced to 25 miles per hour (40 km/h) on some coast roads during the summer months.

Most road markings are the same as those in the UK, with the exception of:

- A yellow line across the exit of a minor road means stop and give way to traffic on the major road. A yellow arrow painted on the road warns of a yellow stop line ahead.
- Junctions marked filter-in-turn. At these junctions, all directions have equal priority.
- Yellow kerb-side no-stopping lines are single lines and mean you must not stop for any reason other than to avoid an accident.

The Ruette Tranquille network (French for "quiet street") is a series of smaller lanes that give priority to pedestrians, cyclists and horse-riders. These have a recommended speed of 15 miles per hour (24 km/h), with pressure groups lobbying for the recommended speed's legal enforcement. Ruette Tranquilles can be found primarily in the parishes of Castel, Forest, St. Andrew, St. Martin, St. Sampson and St. Saviour, and are occasionally connected by Link Paths and Link Roads. The Walking Cycling Guernsey app was created in 2019 to provide information on the entire network.

The School Street initiative was introduced in 2023 and restricts vehicular access during school drop-off and pick-up times, in favour of active travel on roads leading to local schools. Exemptions have been made for emergency vehicles and buses, and for residents living in surrounding areas.

==== Driving laws ====
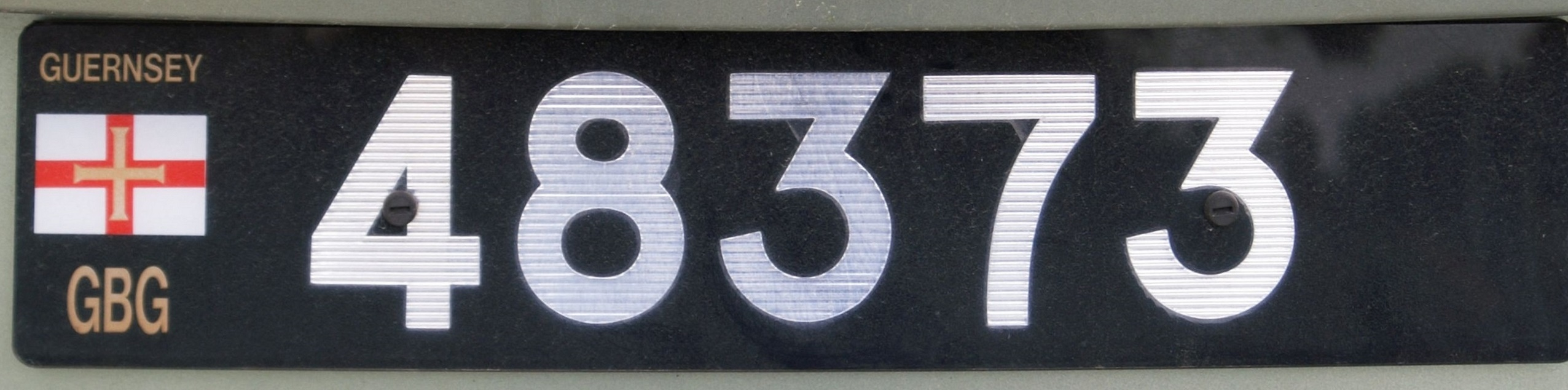
Guernsey vehicle number plate

Driving laws in Guernsey are the United Kingdom Highway Code, supplemented by the Guernsey Highway Code.

Number plates in Guernsey became legal in 1908. Guernsey plates consist of up to five digits, with no letters, while Alderney uses 'AY', followed by four digits. An oval containing the letters GBG (Great Britain and Northern Ireland – Guernsey), the island's international vehicle registration code, is sometimes included.

Motor tax was abolished in Guernsey from 1 January 2008. Vehicle registration plates in Guernsey carry between one and five numerals only; the international identification sticker/plate is "GBG".

Drink-driving is illegal in Guernsey. Police use breathalyser tests during spot checks and a person is guilty if there is over 35 microgrammes of alcohol per 100 ml breath.

Sark and Herm ban motor vehicles other than tractors from their roads.

=== Cycling ===
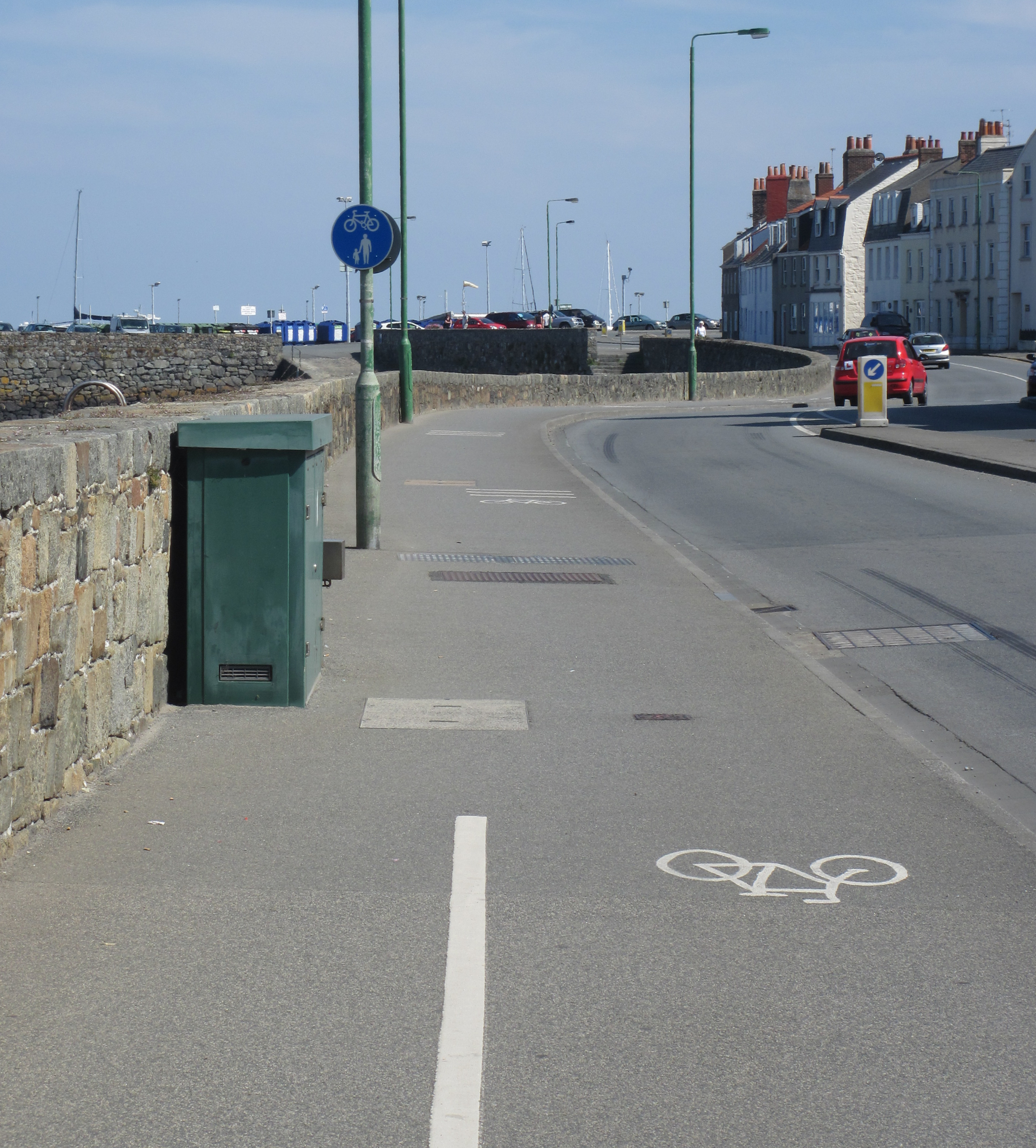
Part of the cycle route that runs along the east coast of Guernsey

Cycling is encouraged in Guernsey, and there are various cycle routes and paths on the island, including a dedicated cycle route that runs along the island's east coast between Bulwer Avenue in St. Sampson and North Beach in St. Peter Port, with shared pedestrian usage. There are other routes in the north of the island.

On paths along the north and west coasts, cyclists are recommended to travel no more than 10 miles per hour (16.09 km/h), whereas on cliff paths in the south, cycling has been banned.

=== Bus ===
Guernsey's bus network has been operated by Stagecoach South West on behalf of the States of Guernsey's Committee for the Environment and Infrastructure since April 2025. The service is currently branded as Buses.gg, with all service routes operating to and from the Town Terminus bus station in St Peter Port. 28 public routes and 24 school routes are run, with routes 91 and 92 forming a complete circuit of the island.

Vehicles used are based on buses used in the UK but with a slightly narrower construction, to allow them to circulate on the island's narrow roads, with the legal limit of 2.31 meters (7' 6¾"). Several narrower (and shorter) StreetVibe buses arrived from May 2017 onwards. Two Enviro100EV buses were purchased in early 2026.

Most bus journeys have a fixed single fare price of £1.60 per journey; however, one free transfer is permitted if a change buses is needed in order to complete the journey. After 9pm, limited night services operate a flat £5 fare and 1-day and 2-day unlimited travel passes are available. Payments can only be made by contactless or by 'Puffinpass'; however, cash payments are accepted at the Town Terminus Shop for top ups and the purchase of unlimited travel passes. The Puffinpass offers discounted single fares for daytime journeys in the form of Pay As You Go, unlimited weekly travel passes, student passes for ages 5–16, concession cards for ages 65+ and family travel passes. Residents in possession of a concessionary or student Puffinpass travel for free on all daytime services. Children under the age of 5 travel for free.

1.65m journeys were taken in 2016. Bus usage increased year on year, reaching a record high of 2 million journeys in 2019. However, usage subsequently fell due to the COVID-19 pandemic. In March 2023, monthly usage was higher than pre-pandemic levels for the first time.

There are no bus services in Herm or Alderney. However, there is a 'tractor bus' ferrying passengers up Harbour Hill from the harbour to the Avenue in Sark.

=== Taxis ===
Guernsey has a regulated, licensed taxi service based at ranks in central St Peter Port, St Sampson and at Guernsey Airport. Taxis can also be booked by telephone.

Accessible taxis capable of transporting a wheelchair passenger and with improved lighting to assist people who may have a visual impairment are available.

Alderney also has a regulated, licensed taxi service based at a rank at Alderney Airport where there are dedicated taxi phone lines.

There is no taxi service on Herm or Sark.

=== Carbon output ===
With effect from 2030, the sale of new combustion engine cars will be banned, which forms part of the net-zero climate change plan.

== Air ==
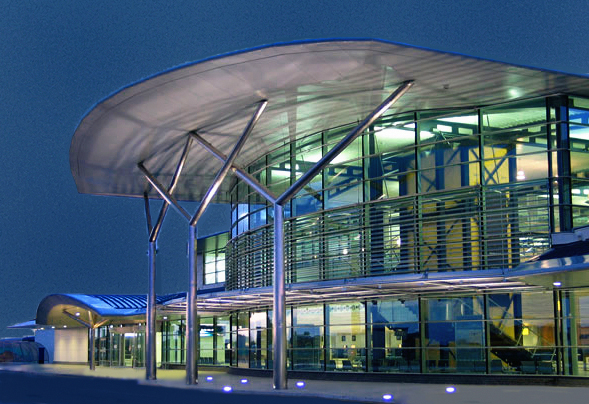
The Guernsey Airport terminal building

There are only two airports in the Bailiwick of Guernsey. The largest is Guernsey Airport, located 3 miles (5 km) south-west of St Peter Port in the parish of Forest. The airport is the headquarters for state-owned flag carrier Aurigny, who operate the majority of flights to the United Kingdom and International destinations, alongside other airlines.

On Alderney, the much smaller Alderney Airport has regular scheduled flights to Southampton and Guernsey.

Both airports have private aircraft facilities and annual air rallies.

== Sea ==
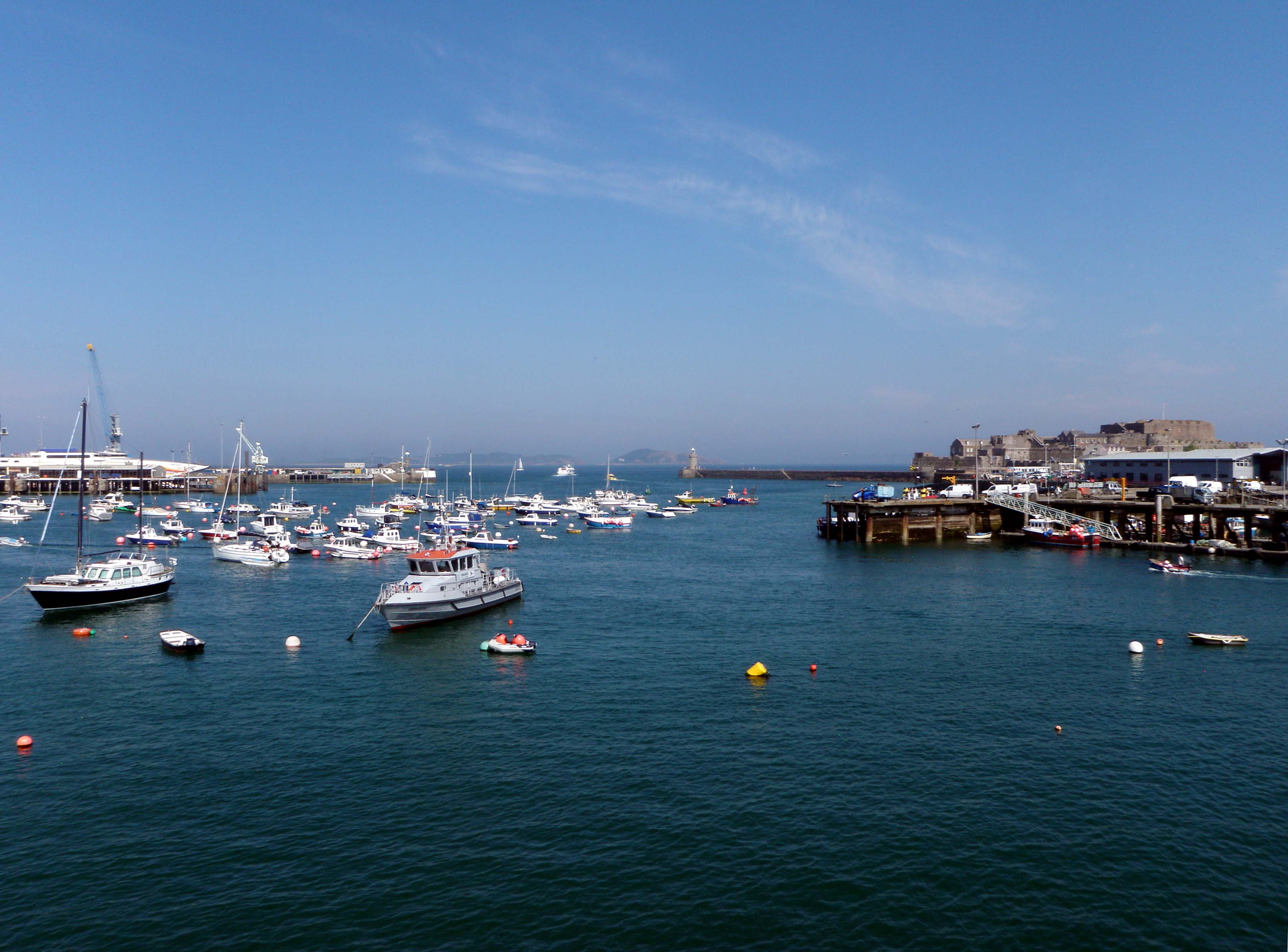
Saint Peter Port Harbour

=== Seaports and harbours ===
Saint Peter Port Harbour is the main port of Guernsey, situated in the island's capital St Peter Port. Others include St Sampson and Beaucette Marina. Ancorages for pleasure craft on various small ports and local beaches are permitted.

Saint Peter Port Harbour houses dedicated ro-ro and lift-on/lift-off facilities for freight and passenger vessels.

=== Operations ===
==== Ferries ====
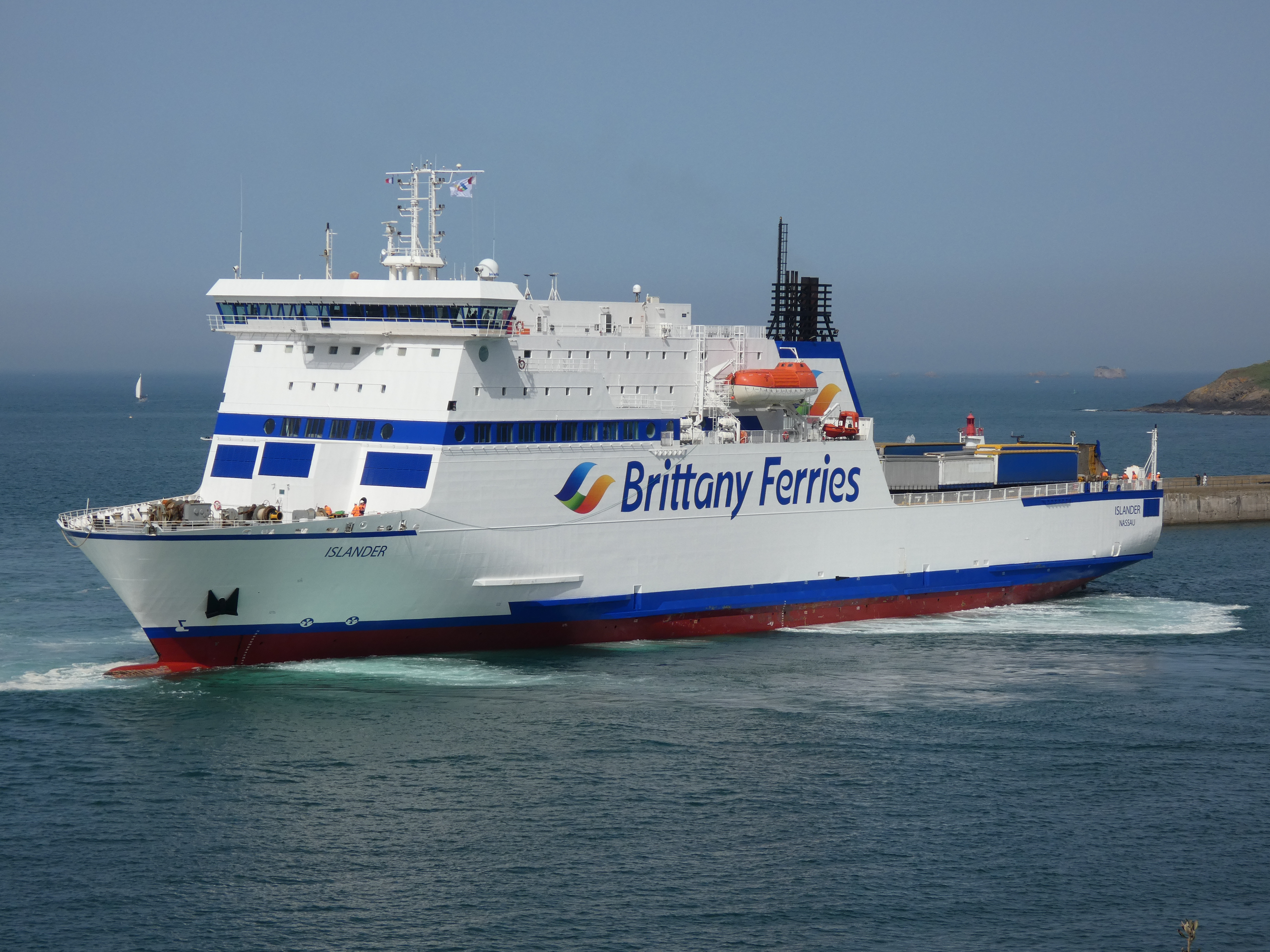
The Islander ro-ro vessel, operated by Brittany Ferries

Guernsey's lifeline ferry operations are provided by French firm Brittany Ferries, who handle both freight and passenger services from Poole and Portsmouth in England, Saint-Malo in France, as well as limited services to Jersey. This follows their majority takeover of Condor Ferries, who became the main operator in the UK following the closure of British Channel Island Ferries in 1994. Previously, Sealink (and its railway ferry predecessors) had been the main operators for many decades.

Various independent companies operate out of Guernsey. Islands Unlimited run a daily foot-passenger service to Jersey, as well as the French company Manche Îles Express, who also operate a summer-seasonal foot-passenger service between Guernsey and Jersey, and to Diélette, France. The Alderney Ferry Service operates various ferries between Guernsey, Alderney and Cherbourg.

Nearby Sark and Herm see daily services to Guernsey. The Isle of Sark Shipping Company operates regular passenger and cargo services to Sark, with Travel Trident running services to Herm all year round.

==== Cruise ships ====
Various cruise ships visit Guernsey throughout the summer, with larger cruises arriving in the Little Roussel, providing tenders to Albert Pier and smaller cruises measuring up to 131 meters (429 ft 9 in) docking in one of two ro-ro berths in Saint Peter Port Harbour.

== Railways ==
=== Alderney ===
The Alderney Railway is a heritage railway of approximately two miles, with a regular timetabled service during the summer months and at seasonal festivals including Easter and Christmas. It is now the only working railway on the Channel Islands. It is also one of the oldest railways in the British Isles, dating from 1847, and carried Queen Victoria and Prince Albert as the first 'official' passengers in 1857.

There is also a 7 1/4 in (184 mm) gauge miniature railway on Alderney, which operates during the summer months.

=== Guernsey ===
The Guernsey Railway, which was virtually an electric tramway, began working on 20 February 1892, was abandoned on 9 June 1934. It replaced an earlier transport system, which was worked by steam, and was named the Guernsey Steam Tramway. The latter began service on 6 June 1879 with six locomotives.

The only railway service currently running on Guernsey is the Sausmarez Manor Miniature Railway line, which first opened in 1985 and runs a quarter of a mile loop through some woodland.

== See also ==
- Bailiwick of Guernsey
- List of shipwrecks in the Channel Islands
- Speed limits in Guernsey
