= Evacuation of civilians from the Channel Islands in 1940 =

Partial evacuation of British dependencies during WWII

The evacuation of civilians from the Channel Islands in 1940 was an organised, partial, nautical evacuation of Crown dependencies in the Channel Islands, primarily from Jersey, Guernsey, and Alderney to Great Britain during World War II. The evacuation occurred in phases, starting with school aged children, their teachers, and mother volunteers. The islands and the British military began the evacuation following the Allies' loss in the Battle of France, after which the British Army withdrew from the islands.

== Background ==
The occupants of the Channel Islands became involved in European events of 1938–39 only as distant and worried listeners to the radio and readers of newspapers. The declaration of War by Britain on 3 September 1939 increased the concern. However, life in the islands continued much as normal. By spring 1940 the islands were advertising themselves as holiday destinations.

On 10 May 1940, the Phoney War ended and Belgium and the Netherlands were invaded. Little did the islanders imagine their homes would be under German occupation for five years, before liberation on 9 May 1945.

When it became clear that the Battle of France was lost, time was limited for anyone to evacuate, even so 25,000 people went to Great Britain, roughly 17,000 from Guernsey, 6,000 from Jersey and 2,000 from Alderney in the ten days before the German troops landed at the end of June 1940. Most civilians who were evacuated went to England.

== Volunteers and early evacuees ==
The National Service (Armed Forces) Act 1939 passed on 3 September 1939 enforced full conscription on all males between 18 and 41, however it only applied to the United Kingdom and had no effect in the independent Channel Islands. A number of men, especially those who had served in the Royal Guernsey Militia or the Royal Militia of the Island of Jersey as well as men who had been in the Officers' Training Corps at Victoria College, Jersey and Elizabeth College, Guernsey travelled to England, volunteered and were swiftly taken into the armed services, the Jersey militia men leaving as an organised unit.

By mid May 1940 the news was not good; Germans were fighting in France and individuals as well as whole families were making plans and taking the ferry to England. Even so, holidaymakers were still coming to the islands. By the beginning of June, the evacuation of Dunkirk was the main topic of conversation, resulting in more people considering leaving the Channel Islands. Paris surrendered without a fight on 14 June.

Not knowing that on 15 June the British Army commanders had decided the Channel Islands were not defensible, the islanders were surprised to see the resident army units quickly depart on ships, with all of their equipment; the islands were being abandoned. The "Channel Islands had been demilitarised and declared... 'an open town'...", without telling anyone, until after the islands had been bombed on 28 June, as the British government did not want to invite the Germans to take the islands.

== June 1940 evacuees ==
=== School children ===
On 19 June the Guernsey local paper published announcements that plans were well in hand to evacuate all the children from the island, telling parents to go to their schools that evening to register and to prepare to send the children away the next day. Some schools asking that the child and their suitcase be brought so it could be checked. Teachers were told they were expected to travel with their children bringing assistants to help, mothers volunteered.

Some schools decided to relocate in total, whereas others had their children scattered amongst local schools all over England, Scotland and Wales. 5,000 schoolchildren evacuated from Guernsey and 1,000 stayed with 12 teachers. Amongst those who stayed were a number from the Castel school, who through a misunderstanding about the boat departure time, missed the sailing.

In Jersey there was no instruction to schools; people could decide themselves if they, or their children, should evacuate. Only 1,000 evacuated with 67 teachers, many travelling with their parents. The remaining 4,500 remained for the occupation with 140 teachers.

=== Other evacuees ===
Mothers with children below school age were authorised to go on the first ships, as were men of military age.

In Jersey, where the school children were on two weeks holiday to help with the potato harvest, everyone who wished to leave was asked to register. Queues quickly appeared, with 23,000 eventually registering. The civil service could not cope and scared of potential riots with desperate people trying to get on ships, announced that it was best to stay in the island with the result that only about 1,000 Jersey children were evacuated with their parents and 67 teachers.

As soon as the majority of the first wave had departed, ships were made available for anyone else who wished to depart, however with the fear of ships being mobbed, riots amongst travellers and in the empty towns, with looting of empty houses and shops, as had happened in France on the Channel coast, the authorities pushed the message that 'staying was best', with posters saying "Don’t be yellow, stay at home", (the "patriot" responsible for this poster fled to England). This led to confusion and disorder, especially in Jersey where the authorities did not think it necessary to evacuate children, therefore it was safe for adults to stay.

The reasons why people stayed or evacuated were personal, ranging from fear of the unknown to noble thoughts of continuing the fight with Great Britain. Only a few people were put under pressure to either evacuate or stay, often due to their important jobs.

The island authorities assumed that all locals who particularly feared a German occupation would leave the islands, such as people of the Jewish faith. Some certainly did, however it came as a surprise to find out later that others had decided not to leave or who were barred from entering the United Kingdom, because they were "aliens", resulted in around 20 people the Germans would define as "Jewish" becoming trapped in the islands.

Houses, cars and businesses were abandoned by those evacuating. Some locked their front doors, some did not, reasoning that someone would break the door to get in anyway. Some gave away pets, others just released them, many put them down. Some gave away furniture and belongings, some gave it to someone for safe storage, others simply walked away, leaving dirty dishes in the sink and food on the table. The withdrawal of cash from banks was limited to £20 per person. People could take just one suitcase.

The Lieutenant Governor of Jersey and Lieutenant Governor of Guernsey left their islands on board ships on 21 June 1940, the day France surrendered.

=== Ships ===
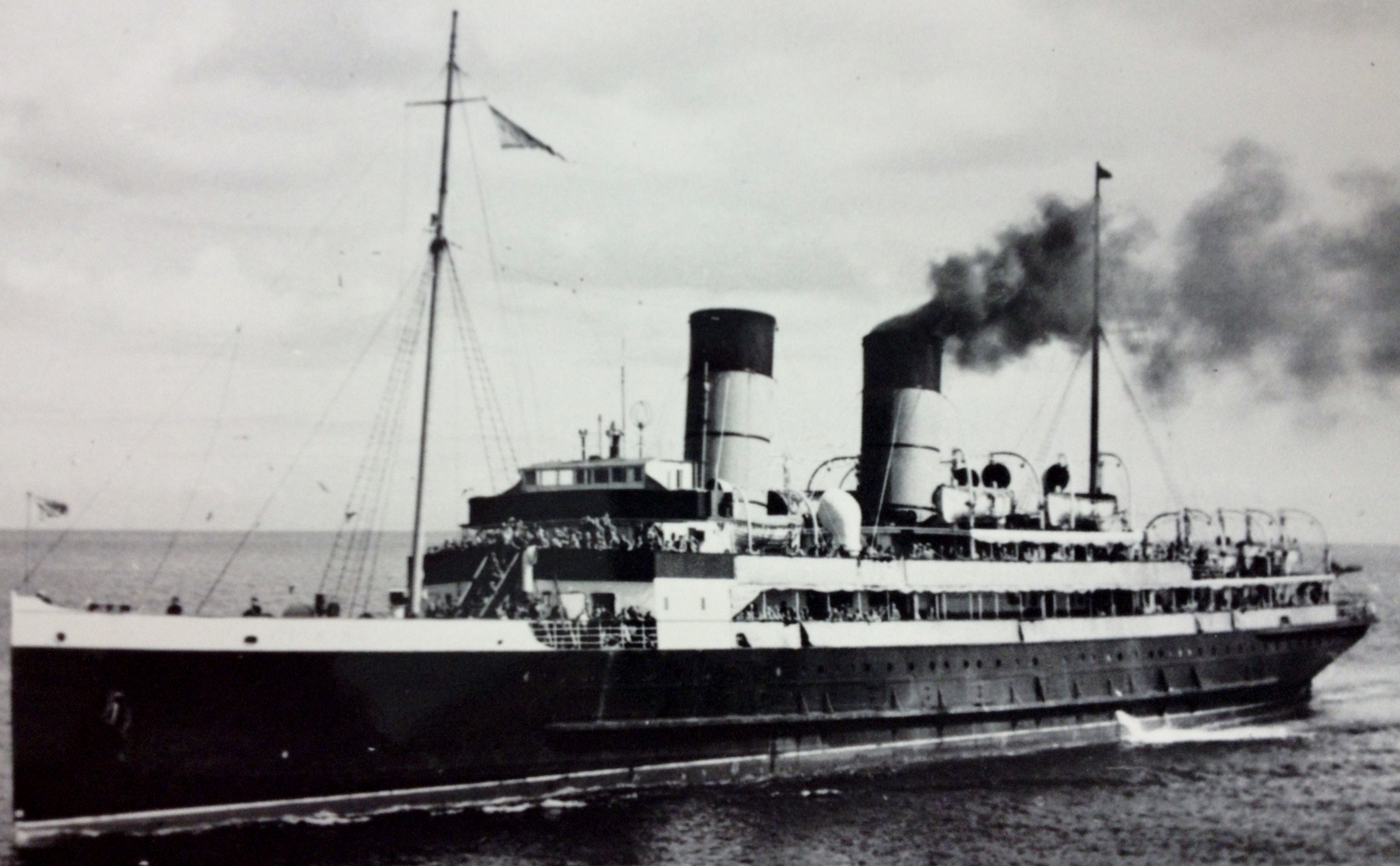
SS Viking in Steam Packet service.

Ships urgently needed to evacuate soldiers from France in Operation Aerial, were diverted to help civilians in the Channel Islands. Marshal Philippe Pétain requested an armistice on 17 June and on 19 June nearby Cherbourg was captured by German forces.

25 ships took people from Guernsey on 21 June alone, ships like the SS Viking, built in 1905, and which served as HMS Vindex until 1918. Requisitioned in 1939 as a troopship, she transported 1,800 schoolchildren from Guernsey to Weymouth. Eighteen ships sailed on 21 June from Jersey including the SS Shepperton Ferry carrying military stores and 400 evacuees. Evacuation ships stopped on 23 June, when ships sailed for England empty. The regular cargo boats and ferries were asked to resume normal service and six evacuation ships were sent to Alderney on 23 June, where previous ships had docked and left almost empty of passengers. 90% of all Channel Island evacuees were taken to Weymouth Harbour, Dorset.

Several ships including the Southern Railway SS Isle of Sark, the normal cross channel ferry, were docked in St Peter Port harbour on 28 June when the Luftwaffe arrived and six Heinkel He 111 bombers attacked Guernsey. Lewis machine guns on the ships opened fire, to no visible effect. The bomb damage was mainly to the harbour where lorries loaded with tomatoes for export were lined up. 34 people died. A similar attack occurred in Jersey where nine died. That night the Isle of Sark sailed for England with 647 refugees. She was the last ship to sail, its Captain, Hervy H. Golding being awarded an OBE for his actions that day.

The fact that Guernsey was loading ships with tomatoes rather than people indicates the lack of panic; ships from Guernsey and Jersey designated to carry evacuees were sometimes packed, but others did not sail to their full capacity. No hospital ship had arrived to take the elderly and sick away. Several ships, including the Guernsey lifeboat, were machine gunned by German aircraft. With enemy aircraft and submarines operating in the Channel, it was lucky that no evacuation ship was sunk.

=== Aircraft ===
R.A.F. units moved from Dinard in France to Jersey on 15 June, No. 17 Squadron RAF and No. 501 Squadron RAF flying sorties until 19 June, in support of the evacuation from Cherbourg, when the aircraft flew to England and the ground support units were evacuated on the SS Train Ferry No. 1. Other military planes were using the Islands - on 17 June 1940, a de Havilland Dragon Rapide DH.89 plane arrived in Jersey from Bordeaux evacuating Général de brigade Charles de Gaulle from France. He stayed for lunch whilst waiting for the plane to be refuelled, before flying on to London.

319 people evacuated the islands on five civilian de Havilland Express DH-86 aircraft, between 16 and 19 June, landing in Exeter.

== Evacuees in the UK ==
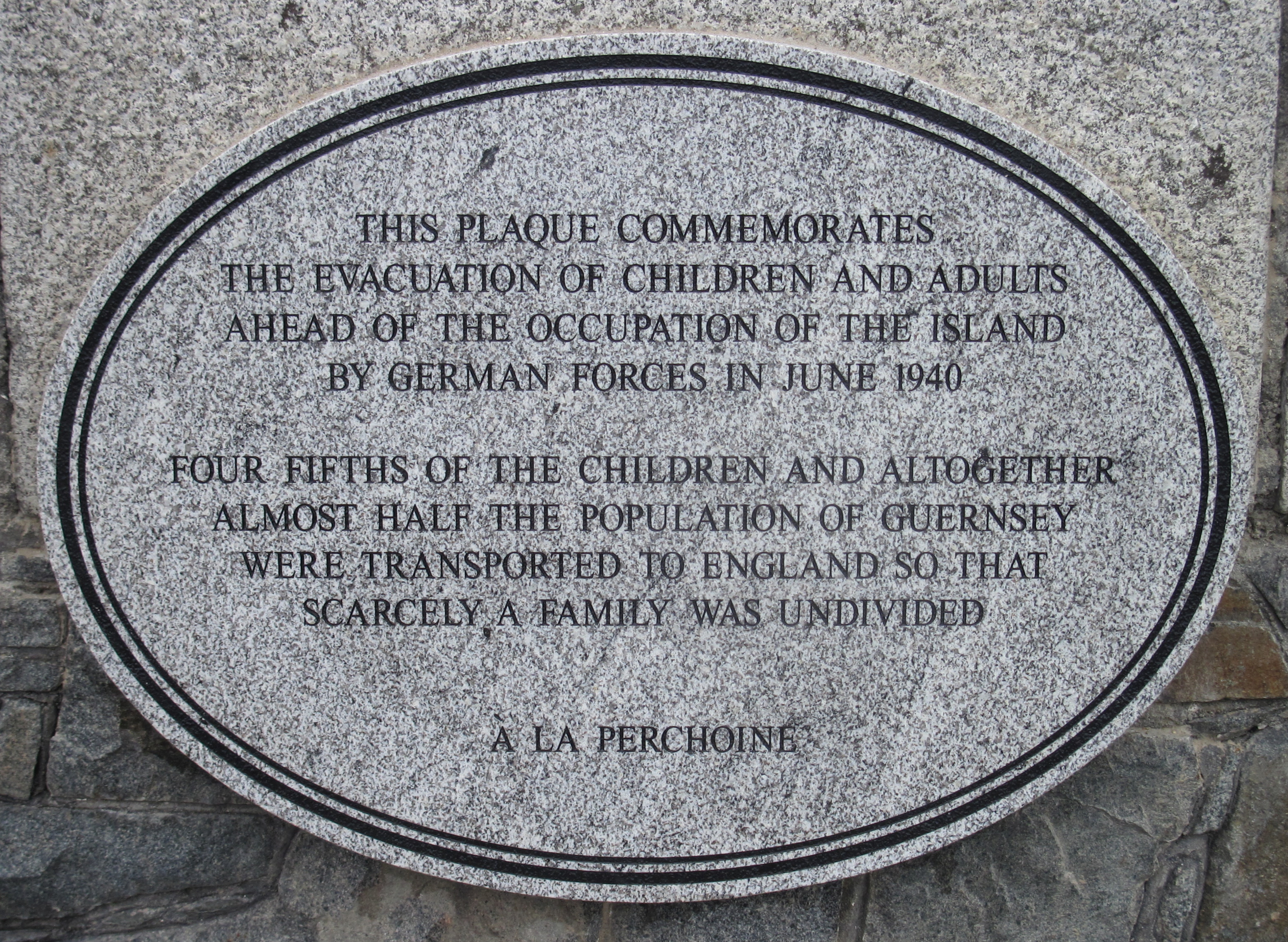
Memorial in Saint Peter Port: "This plaque commemorates the evacuation of children and adults ahead of the occupation of the island by German forces in June 1940. Four fifths of the children and altogether almost half the population of Guernsey were transported to Great Britain so scarcely a family was undivided. À la perchoine."

=== Schools ===
Upon arrival in England, the Guernsey school children were met with mountains of jam sandwiches, bread and butter and tea, before being given a medical and put on crowded blacked out trains, machines most island children had never seen before, to be transported north. There were 5,000 Guernsey children with their teachers and 500 mothers who became teaching assistants.

- Elizabeth College, Guernsey sent initially to Oldham, moved on to Great Hucklow and Buxton in Derbyshire
- Intermediate School for Boys merged with Oldham Hulme Grammar School
- Intermediate School for Girls went to Rochdale
- Ladies' College went to Denbigh in Wales
- Forest and St Martin's Schools set up in Cheadle Hulme in Cheshire
- Other primary schools managed to keep pupils together and established themselves in several small communities.

Most Alderney and Jersey school children were scattered, attending different local schools, except Victoria College, Jersey pupils who congregated at Bedford School

In the years to come, children leaving school at the normal age of 14 went into occupations including war industries and would join the Home Guard. 17-year-old girls could join the ATS or WLA.

=== Families ===
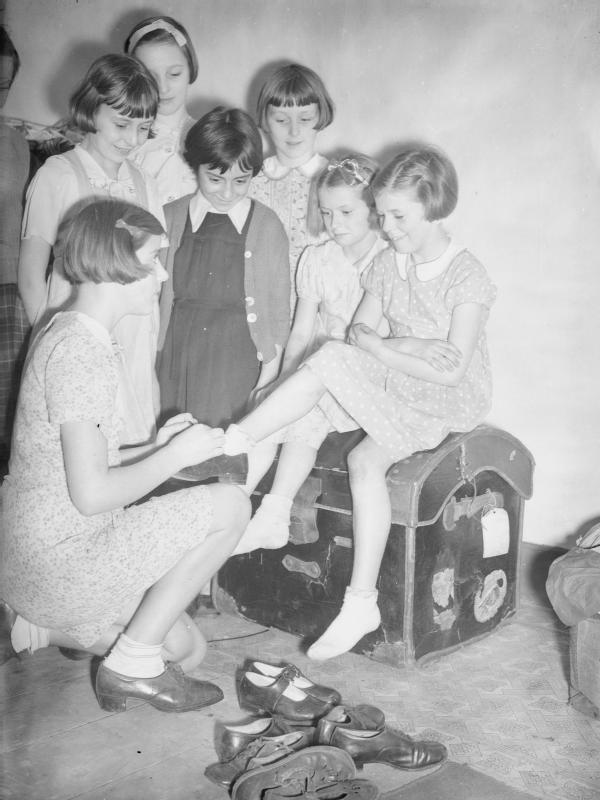
Channel Island evacuees try on American clothing in Marple, Cheshire, England, 1940

Some reception centres run by The Salvation Army and WVS helpers were surprised to discover that Channel Islanders could speak English, having arranged for translators to be available, islanders answering questions put to them in French with their own local Patois which the translators could not understand. Some ignorant people asked if they had sailed across the Mediterranean and why were they not wearing grass skirts.

Stockport received at least 1,500 refugees and would years later erect a blue plaque to commemorate the event, others went to Bury, Oldham, Wigan, Halifax, Manchester, Glasgow and many other towns.

Some mothers travelling with children whose husbands either stayed in the islands or had joined the armed services initially found attempts were made to take their children away as it was considered they could not possibly look after them with their husbands away.

Women whose husbands were still in the islands were told they were not allowed to rent accommodation, so found they had to match up with a woman whose husband was in the armed services and share a house. Not being able to live on the public assistance monies, one mother would look after the children whilst another mother went out to work; sometimes both worked, one doing a night shift and the other a day shift.

Some houses were not good, previously condemned, damp or bug ridden. Others used empty shops as nothing else was available. If children or families had relatives in the UK, they tended to drift, with their single suitcase of belongings to them, to seek assistance. Some evacuees had brought an elderly relative with them. Islanders were not shy in volunteering for Air Raid Precautions (ARP), Auxiliary Fire Service (AFS), Home Guard or Voluntary Aid Detachment (VAD) duties in their spare time.

People in the North of England generally rallied to help the evacuees. They were very generous, helping with clothes and shoes, arranging picnics, providing free tickets to cinemas and football matches, lending furniture and donating money for Christmas presents for children.

=== Safety ===
Just because thousands had managed to cross the English Channel safely did not mean they would have a safe war. Children from Manchester had recently been evacuated to Canada, as that city was not considered safe; they were replaced by Channel Island children.

Those that joined the armed forces were subject to the usual war risks; those that worked in the UK, whether in war industries or elsewhere were, just like the children, subject to the risk of bombing.

Some of the Channel Island children, like some of the 1,500,000 British children that were evacuated from cities in 1939, would suffer mistreatment and abuse, physical, mental and sexual.

There are stories of extorting child labour, stealing the rations of the children, beatings, etc., but they were in the minority, and most were rescued by inspectors. For a few, being fostered was a better life than they had had at home.

The psychological damage changed many evacuees, especially children and particularly those deprived of their parents, teachers, siblings and friends for five years. Some put up with, even though they hated the experience, most of the children had nobody to talk to about problems and abuse. It was not unusual to blame evacuee children if there was vandalism or something went missing. Most were content and more than a few children formed long lasting friendships with loving caring families that looked after them.

== Contact and communications ==
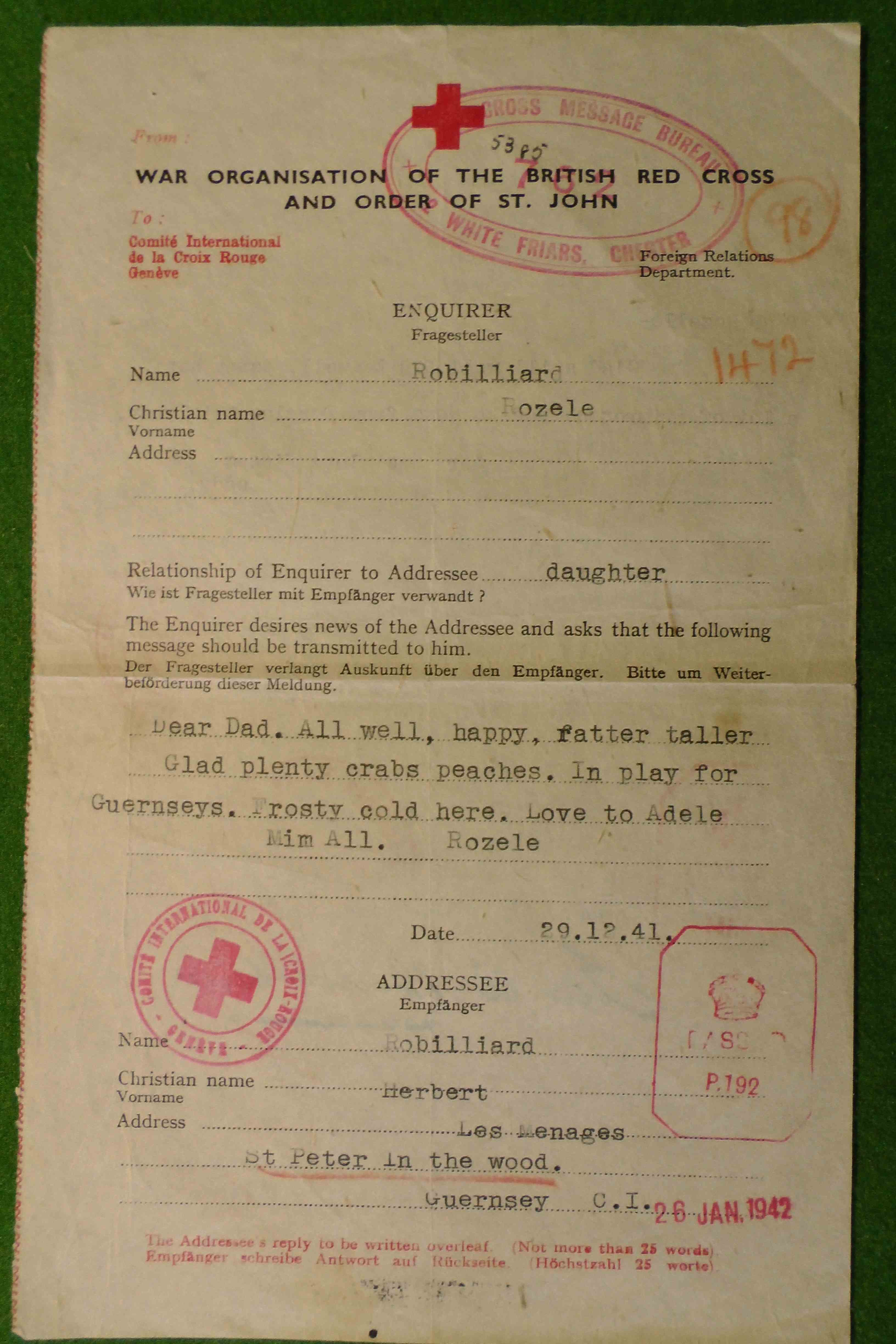
December 1941 Red Cross letter from England

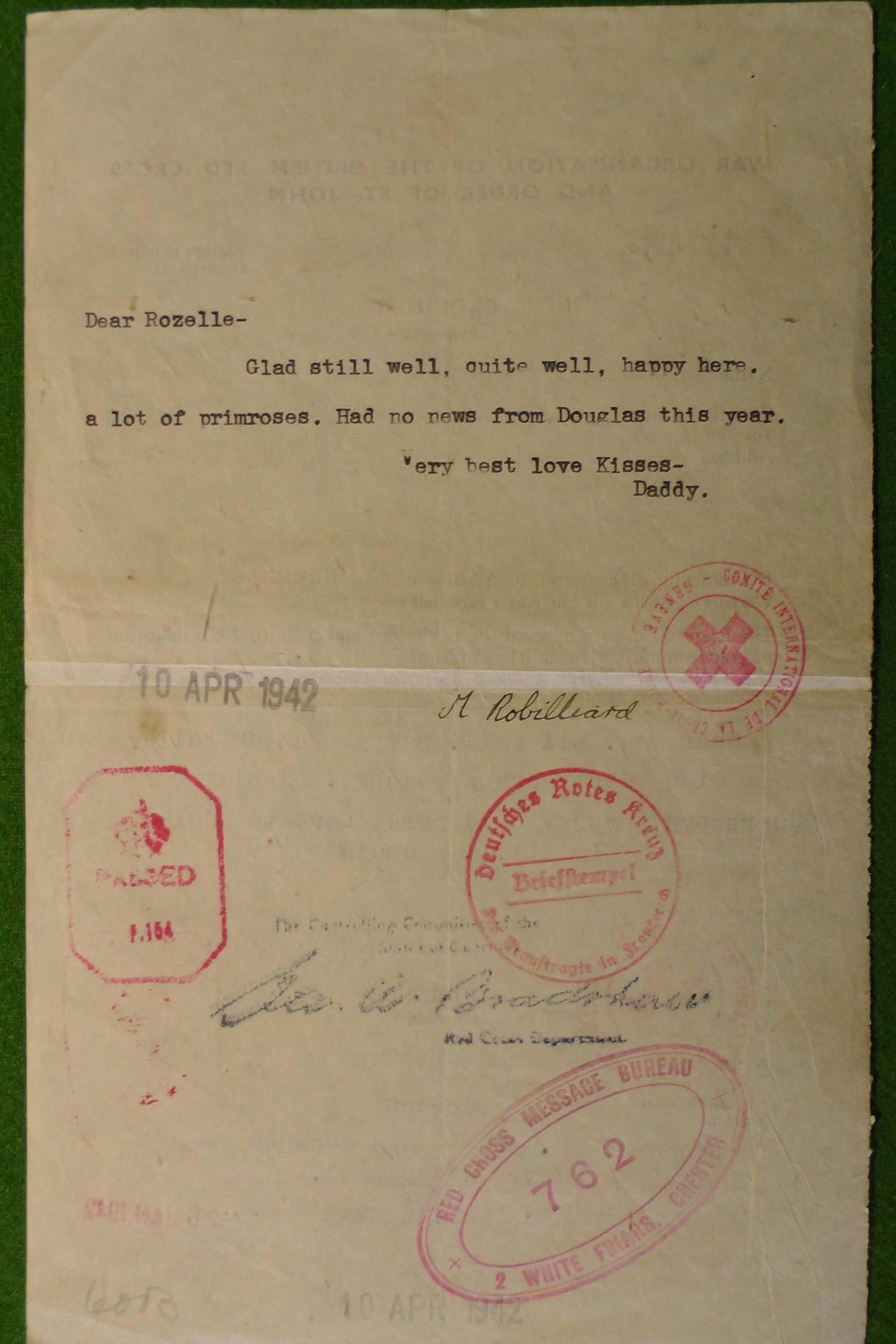
Red Cross letter reply April 1942

Channel Island refugees could not write or receive letters to people at home, as their homes were now occupied by the enemy.

=== Red Cross messages ===
Everyone fleeing the islands left behind friends and relatives. With the islands under German occupation, communications were severed. In 1941, negotiations allowed the International Red Cross message system, which was designed primarily for use by captured soldiers, to include civilians in the Channel Islands. In May 1941, the first 7,000 arrived in England.

It was initially limited to 10 words per letter but was later changed to 25, which was the standard for prisoners-of-wars. The rules changed over the years; at one point, islanders were not permitted to write to relatives but could write to friends. The number of messages that one could send was limited, and replies had to be on the back of the original message. It might take months for a message to arrive although a few of them took only weeks. All messages were routed via the International Red Cross headquarters in Geneva, Switzerland, which dealt with 24 million messages during the war. The islands dealt with around 1 million messages, each of them costing 6d.

To islanders, the tiny link was a saviour. Although slow and limited, it kept vital contacts and reduced fear of the unknown. However, not all messages were good since they included notices like "Baby Mary died last December." One family that had two boys in England received the message "Your son died in England." Messages ceased shortly after 6 June 1944, when the islands were cut off and isolated.

=== Societies ===
The Jersey Society, which had been founded in London in 1896, acted as a link for Jersey evacuees during the war. The society accumulated over 1,000 books published during the war to restock the island libraries after the war.

Over 90 local "Channel Island Societies" were established in England, with weekly meetings and arranged social events, including card games and dances. Welfare committees were established to help islanders, allowing the evacuees to maintain contact, talk about their news, gain mutual support and allow children to play together. Islanders serving in the forces would attend meetings when possible.

The Guernsey Society was formed in 1943 to represent the interests of the island to the British government during the German occupation and to establish a network for Guernsey evacuees in the United Kingdom.

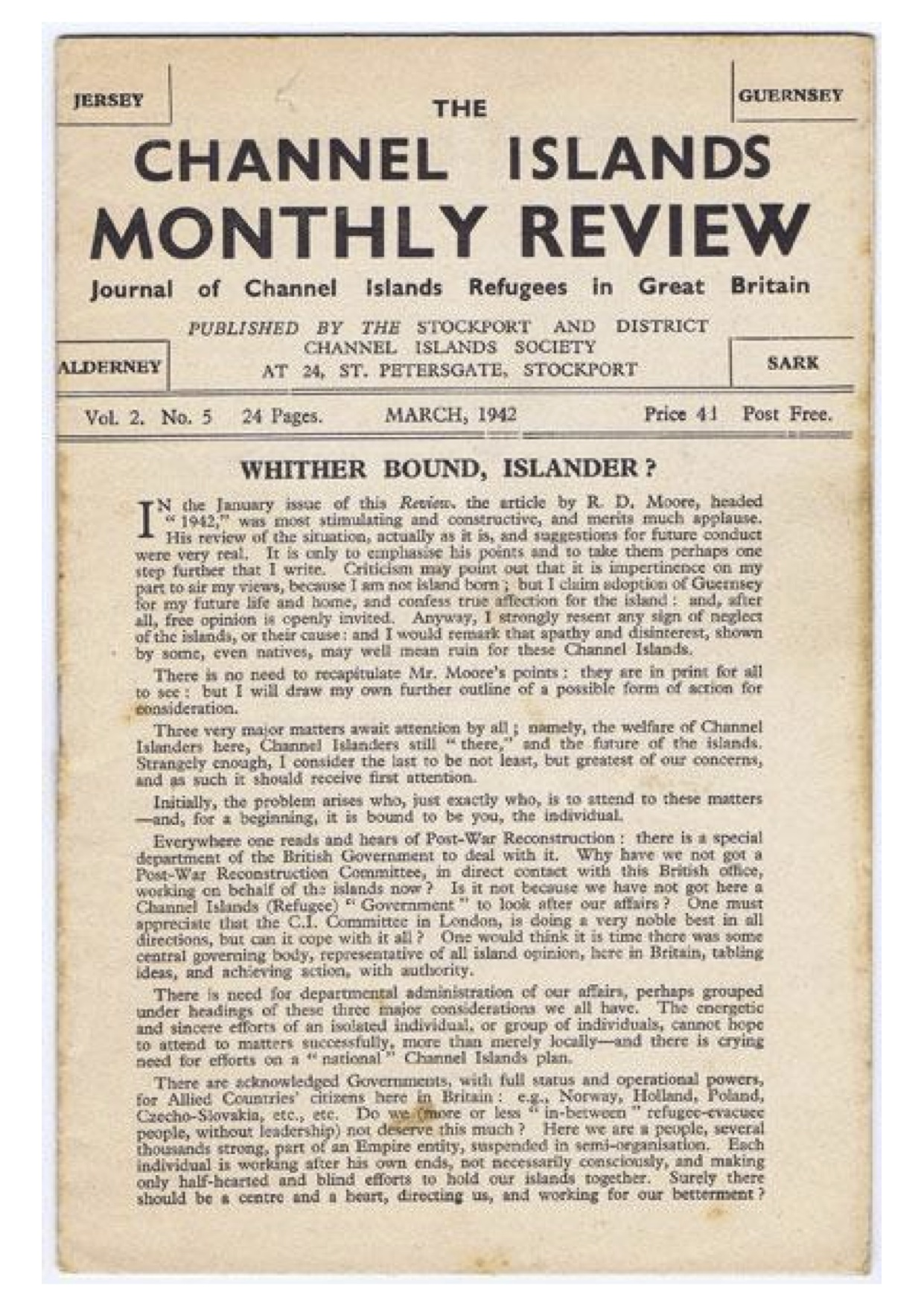
CI Monthly Review

Lapel badges were produced to help islanders recognise other evacuees.

In London, 20 Upper Grosvenor Street was the contact address for islanders, provided a legal bureau and held records for 30,000 Channel Islanders who could be found. A room called Le Coin became a home away from home for anyone passing through the capital wanting to meet other Islanders.

=== Monthly Review ===
The Stockport and District Society was founded in January 1941, when 250 prospective members attended the first meeting. They decided to publish the Channel Island Monthly Review, despite a ban on new periodicals in August 1940 because of paper shortages. The first edition, a four-page sheet, appeared in May 1941. It quickly became popular by the thousands of Channel Island people living in the UK. The Review was threatened with closure in May 1942 after questions in Parliament.

It did not close, and the 20-24 page Review was published with up to 5,000 copies a month posted out to subscribers, including servicepeople all over the world.

The Review included a collection of articles and poetry relevant to Channel Island people and personal comments received from Red Cross messages that might affect other islanders, such as births, marriages and deaths and greeting messages.

Following the Deportations from the German-occupied Channel Islands in September 1942, the December edition of the Review published lists of the deportees and their contact details so that Red Cross messages could be sent to them.

=== Support ===
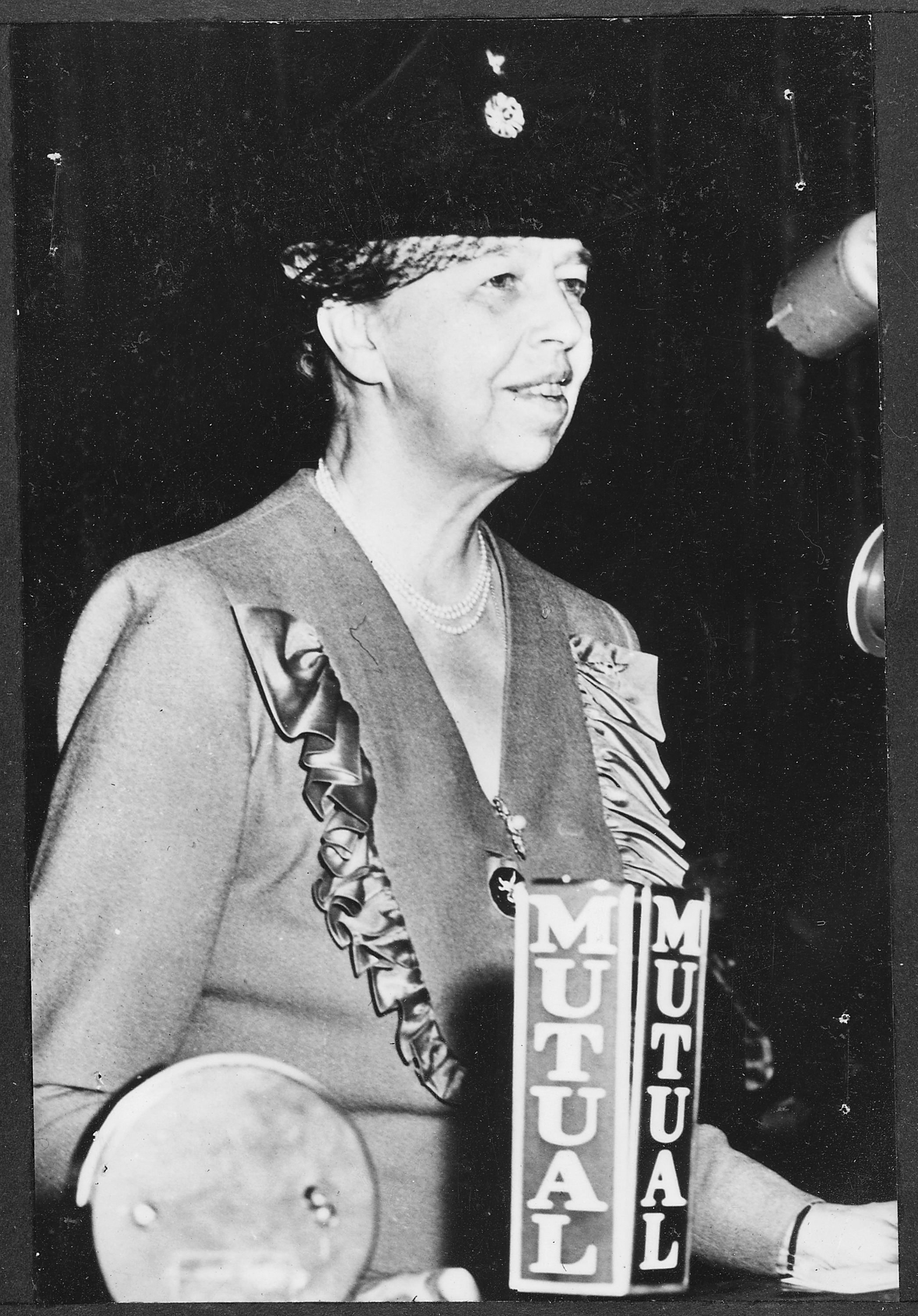
Eleanor Roosevelt at Waldorf Astoria Hotel in New York City - 1943

The Methodist church tried to keep track of their island members in England; introduce them to English Methodists and to provide them with advice, some money, winter clothing and employment.

Many Islanders had emigrated to Canada over the years and got together to help their homeland evacuees. Philippe William Luce founded the Vancouver Society for the 500 Channel Islanders who lived in the area, who collected many thousands of dollars and hundreds of crates of clothing and shoes to send to Great Britain.

A "Foster Parent Plan for Children Affected by War" was originally created in 1937 to help children in the Spanish Civil War, with Americans adopting a child and providing money for education and clothing. Participants included film stars. Eleanor Roosevelt adopted three children in 1942. One, Paulette, was a Guernsey evacuee who referred to her as "Auntie Eleanor who lived in the White House". See also 'Guernsey Evacuees: The Forgotten Evacuees of the Second World War' by Gillian Mawson, (History Press, 2012)

The BBC recorded island children singing for a Christmas 1942 radio broadcast. The BBC also produced a film of the evacuees showing a rally on 19 June 1943 in the Belle Vue Stadium in Manchester that was attended by 6,000 islanders.

The British government had opened up an evacuation account for each of the bailiwicks of Guernsey and Jersey to which certain costs could be charged, such as the cost of the evacuation ships, rail travel and the education costs of children. There were concerns over helping Channel Island private schools with their costs, as British private schools received no help when evacuated from cities.

== Service and death ==
From the people who had left the Channel Islands in 1939 or 1940 and been evacuated in 1940, over 10,000 islanders served with Allied forces.

Island	Population in 1931	Serving in armed forces	Percentage serving	Died whilst serving
Jersey	50,500	5,978	11.8%	516
Guernsey	40,600	4,011	9.8%	252
Alderney	1,500	204	13.6%	25
Sark	600	27	4.5%	1
Channel Islands	93,200	10,220	10.9%	794
UK	44,937,000	3,500,000	7.3%	383,700

A higher percentage of serving people from the islands had died per head of prewar population than in the United Kingdom.

Of those who had stayed in the islands, a higher percentage of civilians died in the islands per head of prewar population than in the United Kingdom.

== Return ==
People began to return in July and August 1945, with some children taking their northern accents with them.

Children who had not seen their parents for five years often did not recognise them. The adults who had stayed in the islands looked old, tired and thin and wore old clothes. A few children never adjusted to the return, as the trauma of separation was too great.

For British foster parents, the trauma of losing the children they had looked after and grown to love could be just as bad. Some children and families kept contact, and many held fond memories and grateful thanks for the northern people who showed so much kindness. The Mayor of Bolton had threatened the islands with another invasion after liberation, as so many Lancashire holidaymakers would want to see the islands about which they had heard so much.

Not all evacuees returned. Families that had owned no property in the islands had found jobs and houses, and some youngsters had found employment and love in their evacuation towns. Some who returned found the men whom they had left in the islands had formed a relationship with another woman. The reverse also applied, with women finding a new partner. Women who had become used to working found no jobs available in the islands apart from scrubbing floors.

Many adults returned at the same time as the schoolchildren, but some who had volunteered for the armed services were demobbed in 1946. The meetings of families could be equally traumatic, with wives and husbands meeting again for the first time in five years and discovering they had lived very different lives and had difficulty talking about them. Those who had been evacuated were told that it was tougher in the islands. Alderney residents were not allowed to return to their island until December 1945.

The islands ended the war with a debt of £9,000,000, which the British government hoped would be repaid. That was roughly the total value of every house in the Channel Islands and included the evacuation accounts. A generous gift from the British government of £3,300,000 was used to recompense islanders who had suffered losses and the cost of maintaining the evacuees, estimated at £1,000,000, was written off by the British government.

== See also ==
- German occupation of the Channel Islands
- Living with the enemy in the German-occupied Channel Islands
- Deportations from the German-occupied Channel Islands
- Resistance in the German-occupied Channel Islands
