= Saint Saviour, Guernsey =

Parish in western Guernsey

St. Saviour
- Parish
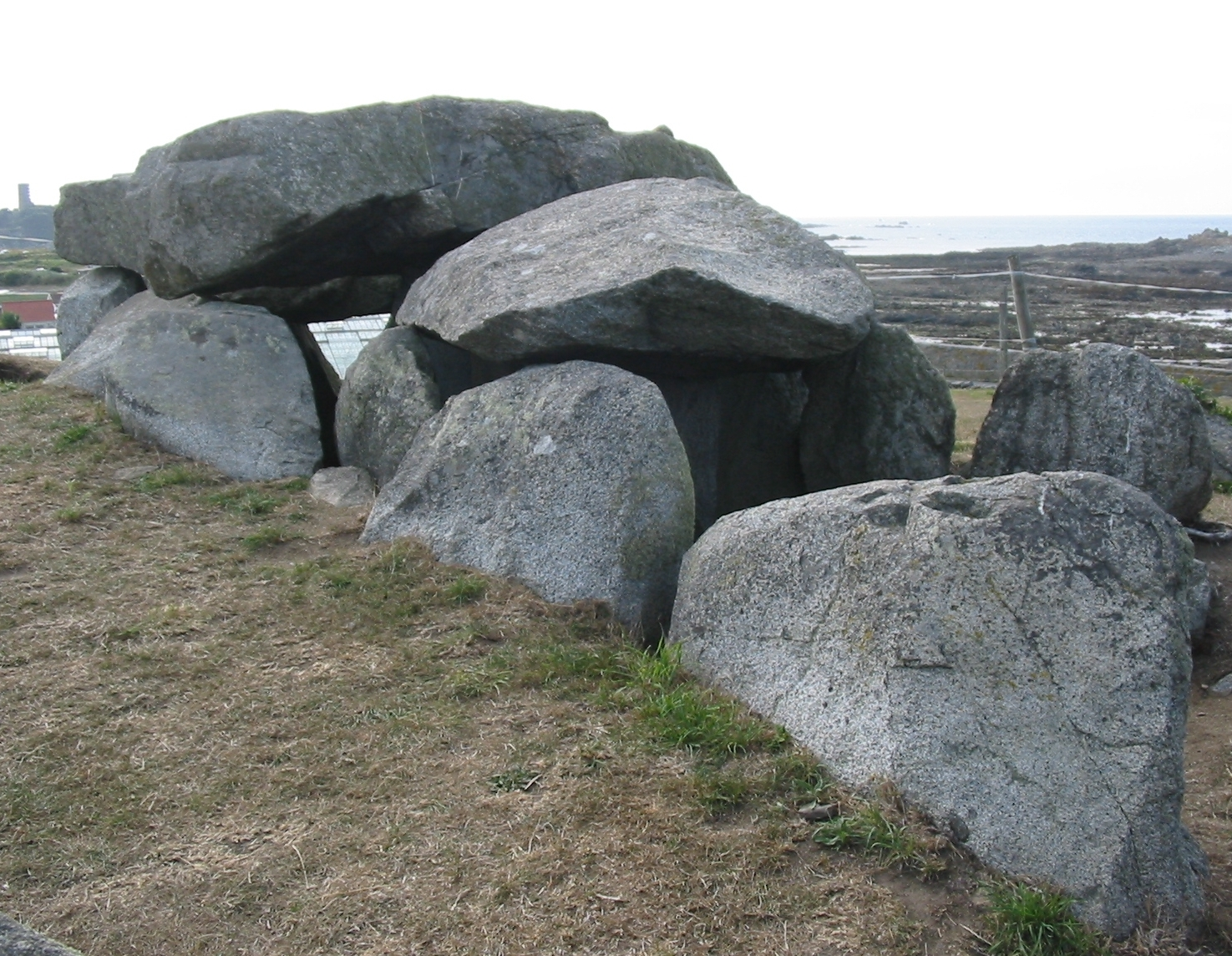
- Le Catioroc (dolmen) in Saint Saviour

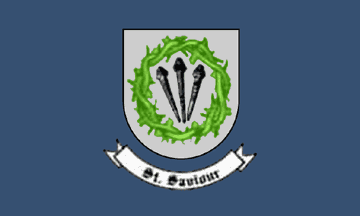
- Flag

- Location of St. Saviour in Guernsey
- Coordinates: 49°27′0″N 2°37′23″W
- Crown Dependency: Guernsey, Channel Islands

Government
  - Electoral district: West

Area
  - Total: 6.2 km^{2} (2.4 sq mi)

Population (2019)
  - Total: 2,765
  - Density: 450/km^{2} (1,200/sq mi)
- Time zone: GMT
  - Summer (DST): UTC+01
- Website: www.stsaviours.gg

St Saviour (Guernésiais: Saint Sauveux; French: Saint-Sauveur) is one of the ten parishes of Guernsey. It is situated on the west coast of the island, west of the parish of Castel, east of St Pierre du Bois, and south of Perelle bay.

People from Saint Sauveux were nicknamed "fouormillaons" in Guernésiais, the insular Norman language of the island. The postal code for street addresses in this parish begins with GY7.

== Features ==
St Saviour is home to the States of Guernsey reservoir, providing a water supply to the whole island.

The parish contains many protected historic constructions, including the parish church, St Saviour church and outside it, the parish war memorial; the 14th century St Apolline's chapel; the Victorian Fort Richmond; the artillery batteries of Mont Chinchon and Perelle of Napoleonic Wars vintage, numerous German fortifications of World War II and several Neolithic sites principally at Le Crocq and Le Catioroc (Mont Chinchon).

The once extensive megalithic site at Le Crocq now consists mainly of two menhirs, although the hedge boundaries in the area contain many of the stones from the destruction of the monument a couple of hundred years previously. At Le Catioroc again there is a lot less than historically; this area featuring more than any other in the witchcraft trials of the 16th and 17th century and appears to have suffered some deliberate destruction, though Le Trepied Dolmen remains.

World War II fortifications, built during the 1940-45 German occupation of the Channel Islands include the St Saviours Tunnel complex beneath the church and parts of the Batterie Mirus, although there are other PAK (Anti Tank), FLAK (Anti Aircraft), artillery, machine gun installations.

Abreuvoirs - places for cattle to drink - are also found in Saint Saviour.

== Politics ==
Saint Saviour comprised part of the West administrative division with Torteval, Forest and St. Pierre-du-Bois, until the 2018 referendum implemented a single constituency.

In the 2016 Guernsey general election there was a 3,188 or 74% turnout to elect five Deputies. Those elected (in order of votes received) being Al Brouard, Andrea Dudley-Owen, Emilie Yerby, David De Lisle and Shane Langlois.

The parish is managed by twelve elected officials known as the Douzane.

== Twin towns ==
Saint Saviour is twinned with:

- Montebourg, Normandy, France
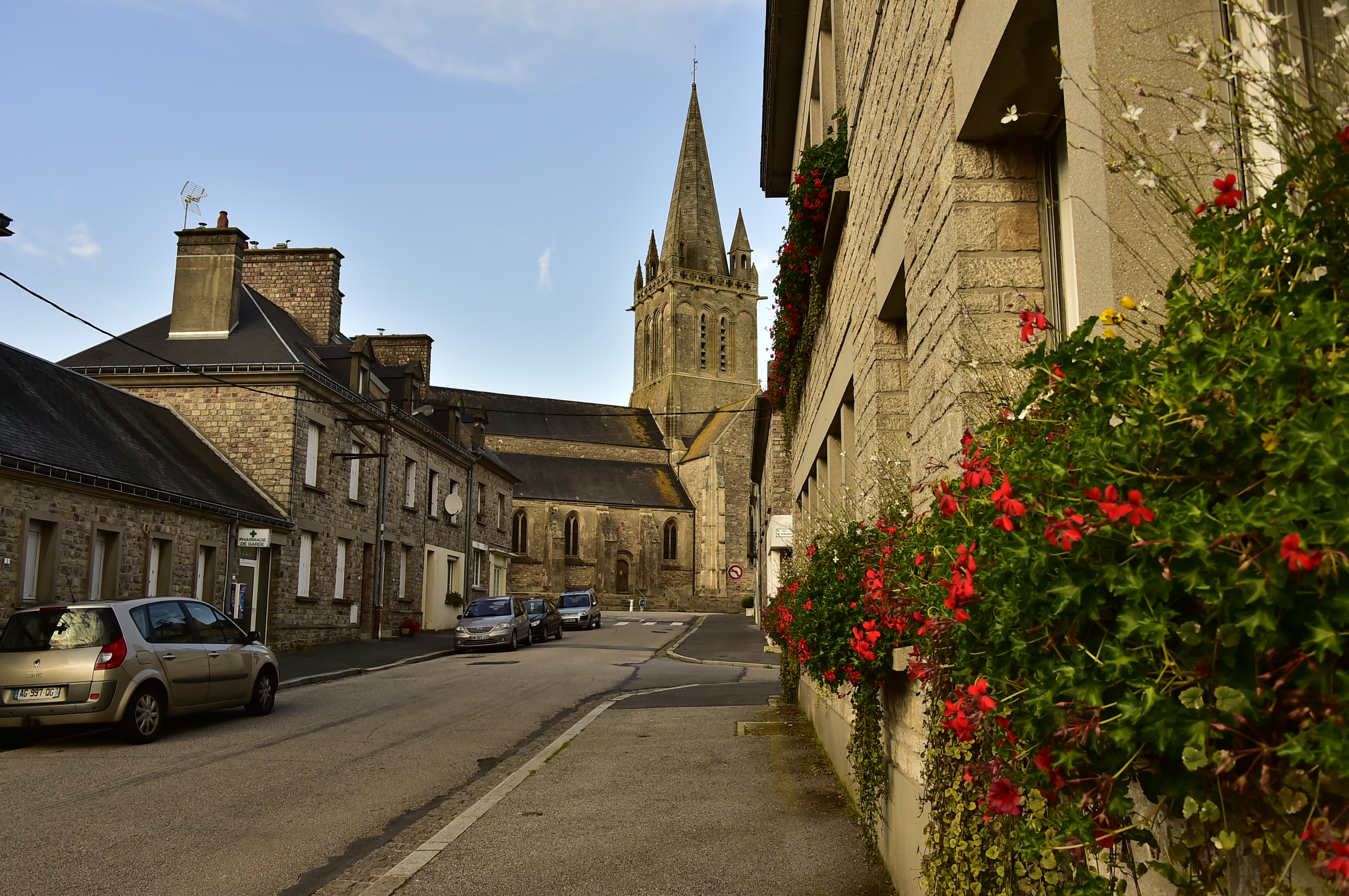
File:Montebourg_-_L'église_Saint-Jacques.jpgMontebourg - L'église Saint-Jacques

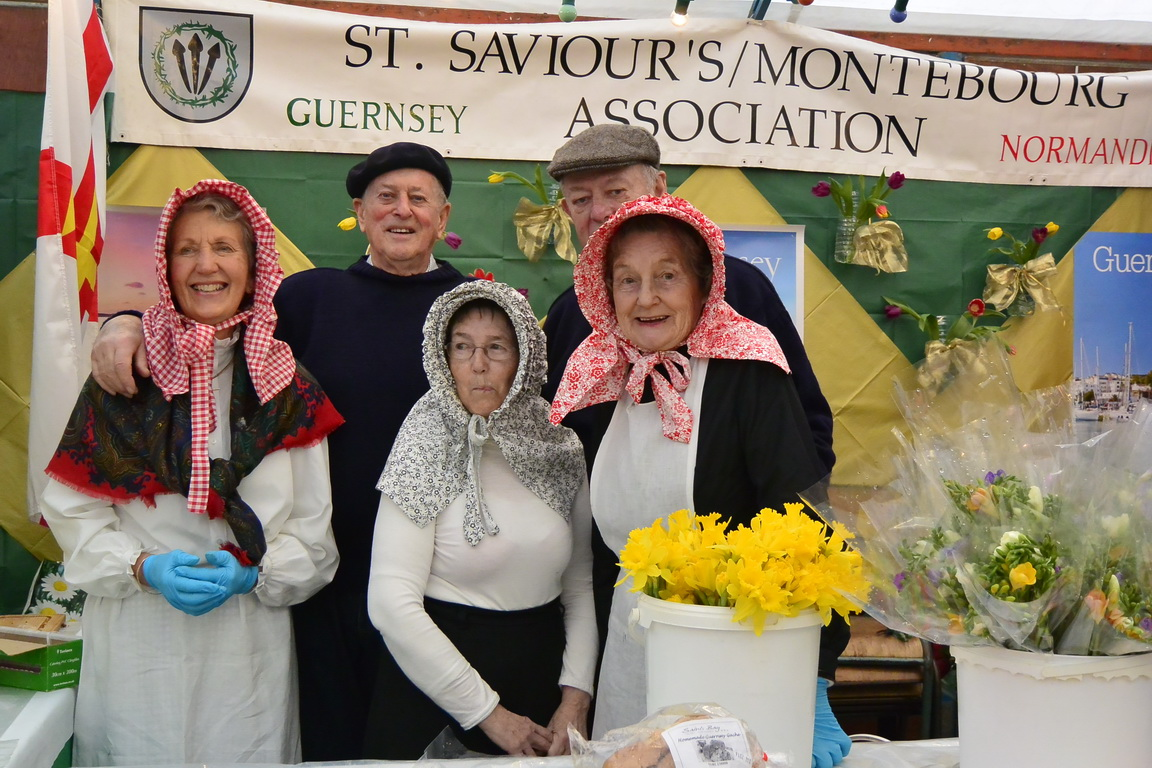
File:Montebourg,_Jumelage,_Saint_Saviour,_Guernsey.jpgSaint Saviour Partnership Committee
