= Montebourg =

- Commune
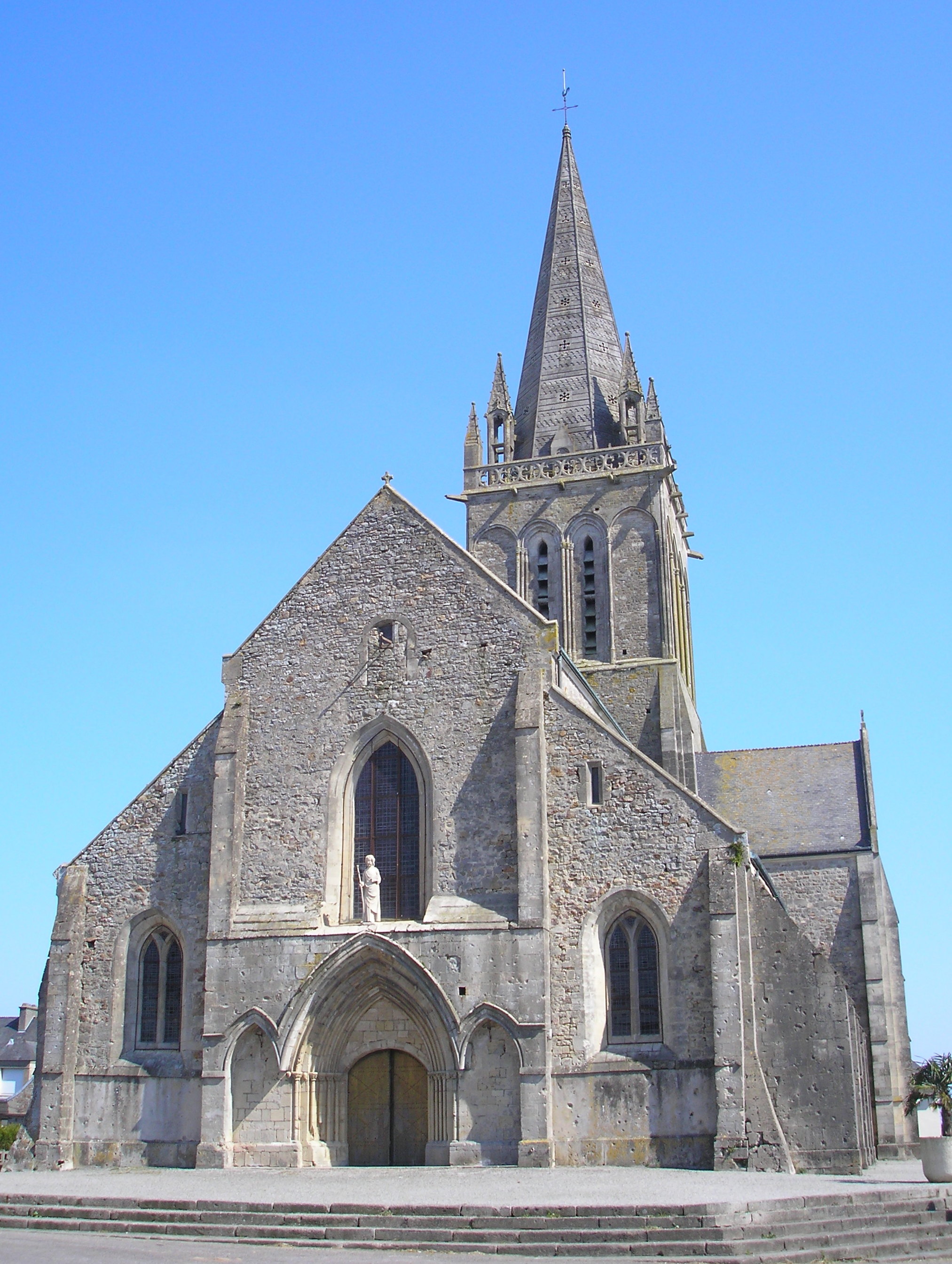
- The church of Saint Jacques
- Location of Montebourg
- Location within France Location within Normandy
- Coordinates: 49°29′18″N 1°22′42″W
- Country: France
- Region: Normandy
- Department: Manche
- Arrondissement: Cherbourg
- Canton: Valognes
- Intercommunality: CA Cotentin

Government
  - Mayor (2020–2026): Jean-Pierre Mauquest
- Area^{1}: 5.89 km^{2} (2.27 sq mi)
- Elevation: 51 m (167 ft)
- Highest elevation: 116 m (381 ft)
- Lowest elevation: 21 m (69 ft)
- Population (2023): 1,925
  - Density: 327/km^{2} (846/sq mi)
- Time zone: UTC+01:00 (CET)
  - Summer (DST): UTC+02:00 (CEST)
- INSEE/Postal code: 50341 /50310
- ^{1} French Land Register data, which excludes lakes, ponds, glaciers > 1 km^{2} (0.386 sq mi or 247 acres) and river estuaries.

Montebourg (French pronunciation: [mɔ̃tbuʁ]) is a commune in the Manche department in Normandy in north-western France.

== Geography ==
Montebourg is located southeast of Cherbourg.

== Population ==
Historical population
Year	Pop.	±% p.a.
1968	2,026	—
1975	2,039	+0.09%
1982	1,956	−0.59%
1990	2,052	+0.60%
1999	2,022	−0.16%
2007	2,084	+0.38%
2012	2,083	−0.01%
2017	2,096	+0.12%
2023	1,925	−1.41%
Source: INSEE

== Heraldry ==
Arms of Montebourg	The arms of Montebourg are blazoned : Gules, a cross moline Or.

== International relations ==
Montebourg is twinned with:

- Walheim,* Aachen, Germany (1960)
- Sturminster Newton, Dorset, England
- Saint Saviour, Guernsey
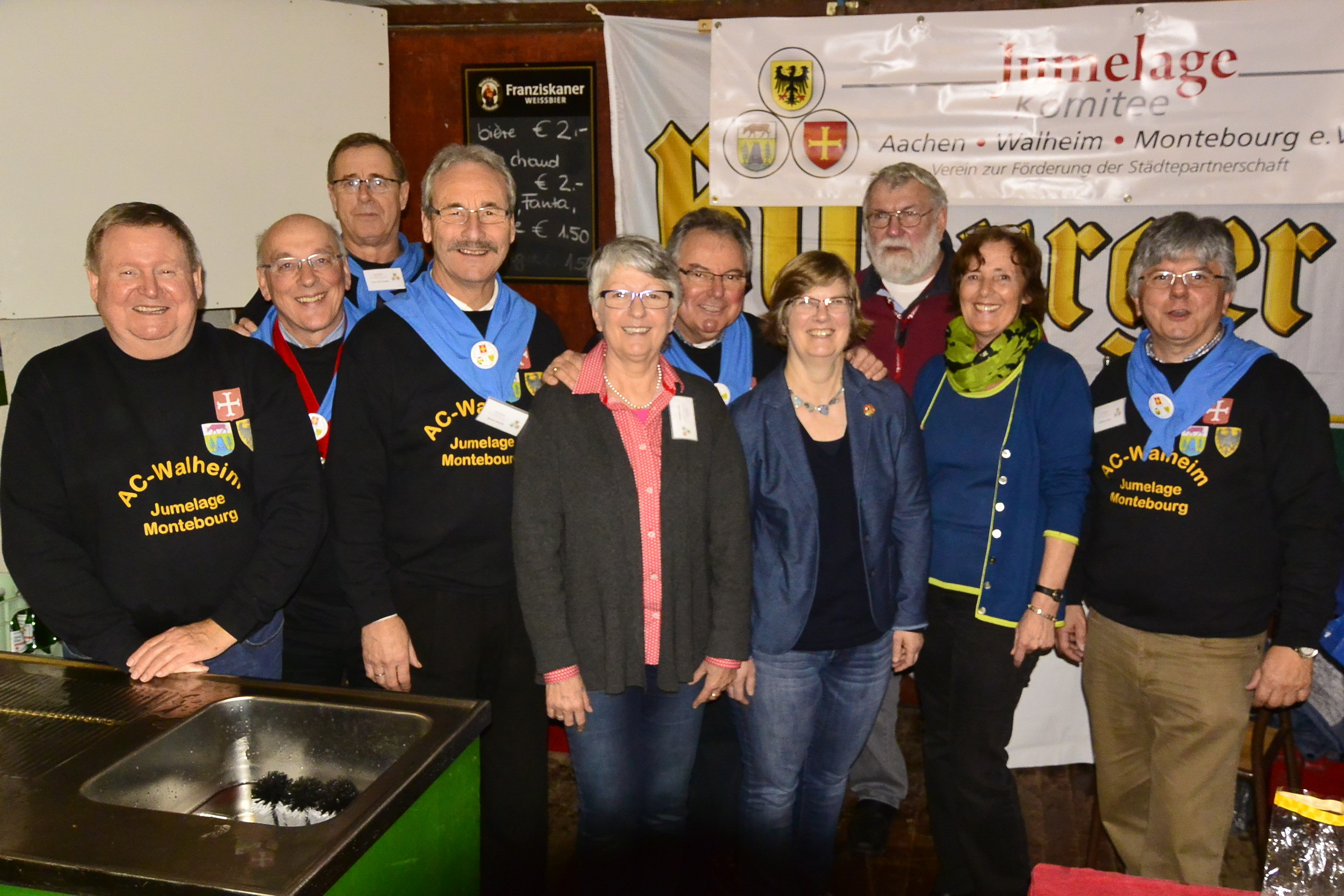
File:Montebourg,_Jumelage,_Aachen-Walheim.jpgAachen Partnership Committee

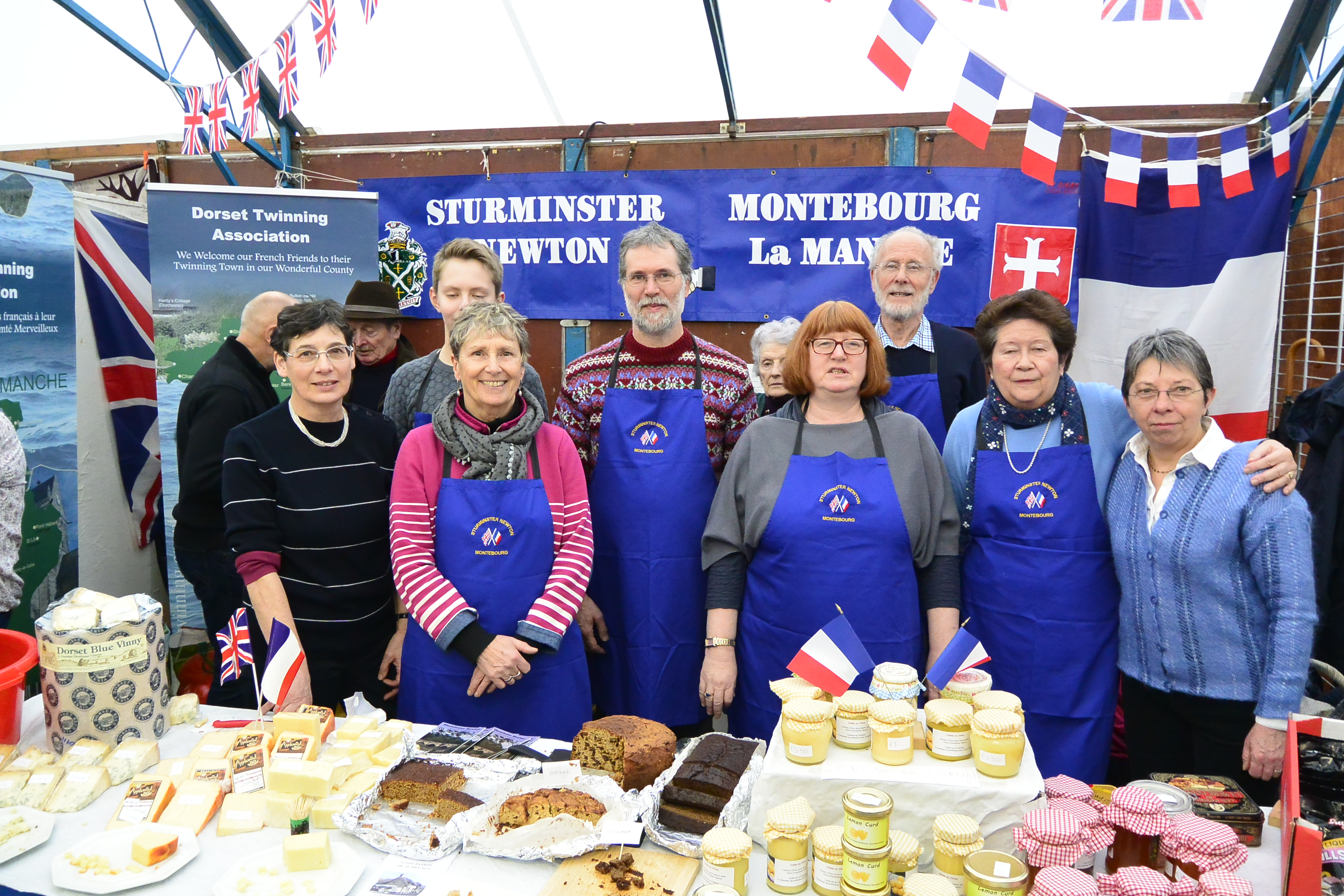
File:Montebourg,_Jumelage,_Sturminster_Newton.jpgSturminster Newton Partnership Committee

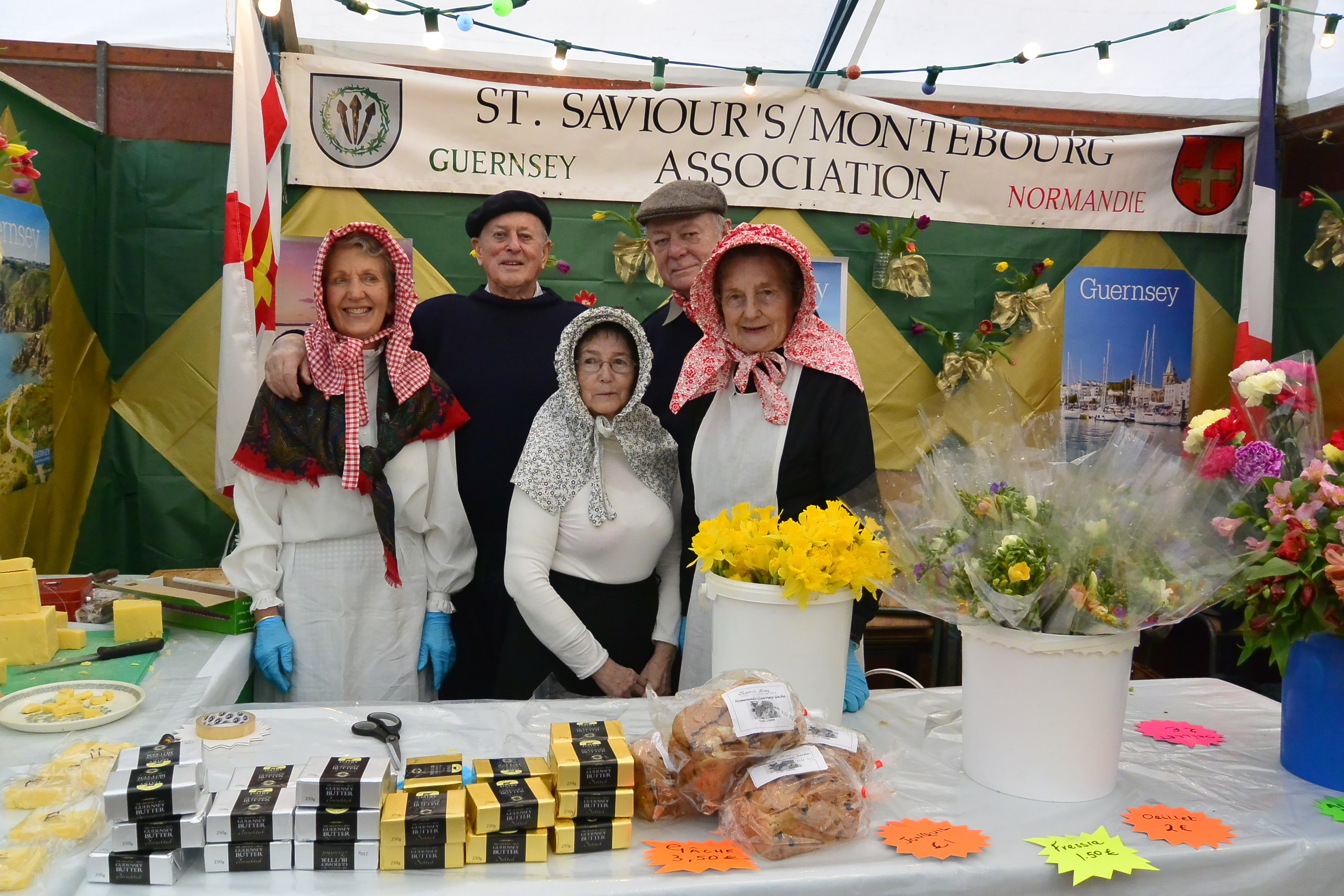
File:Montebourg,_Jumelage,_Saint_Saviour.jpgSaint Saviour Partnership Committee

== Main sights ==
- Église Saint-Jacques de Montebourg
- Abbaye de Montebourg (List of Benedictine monasteries in France)
- Statue de Jeanne d'Arc de Montebourg
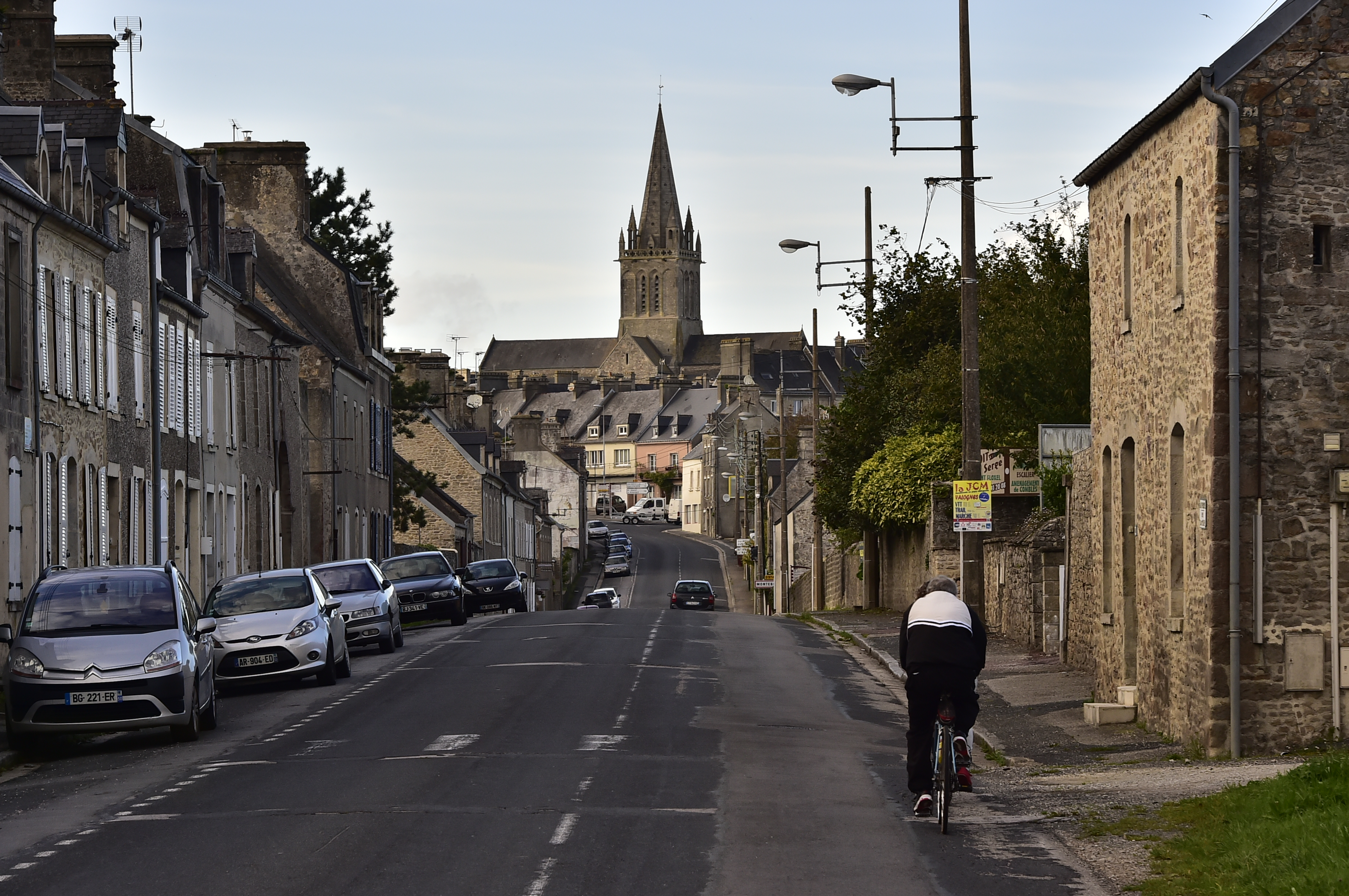
File:Montebourg.jpg

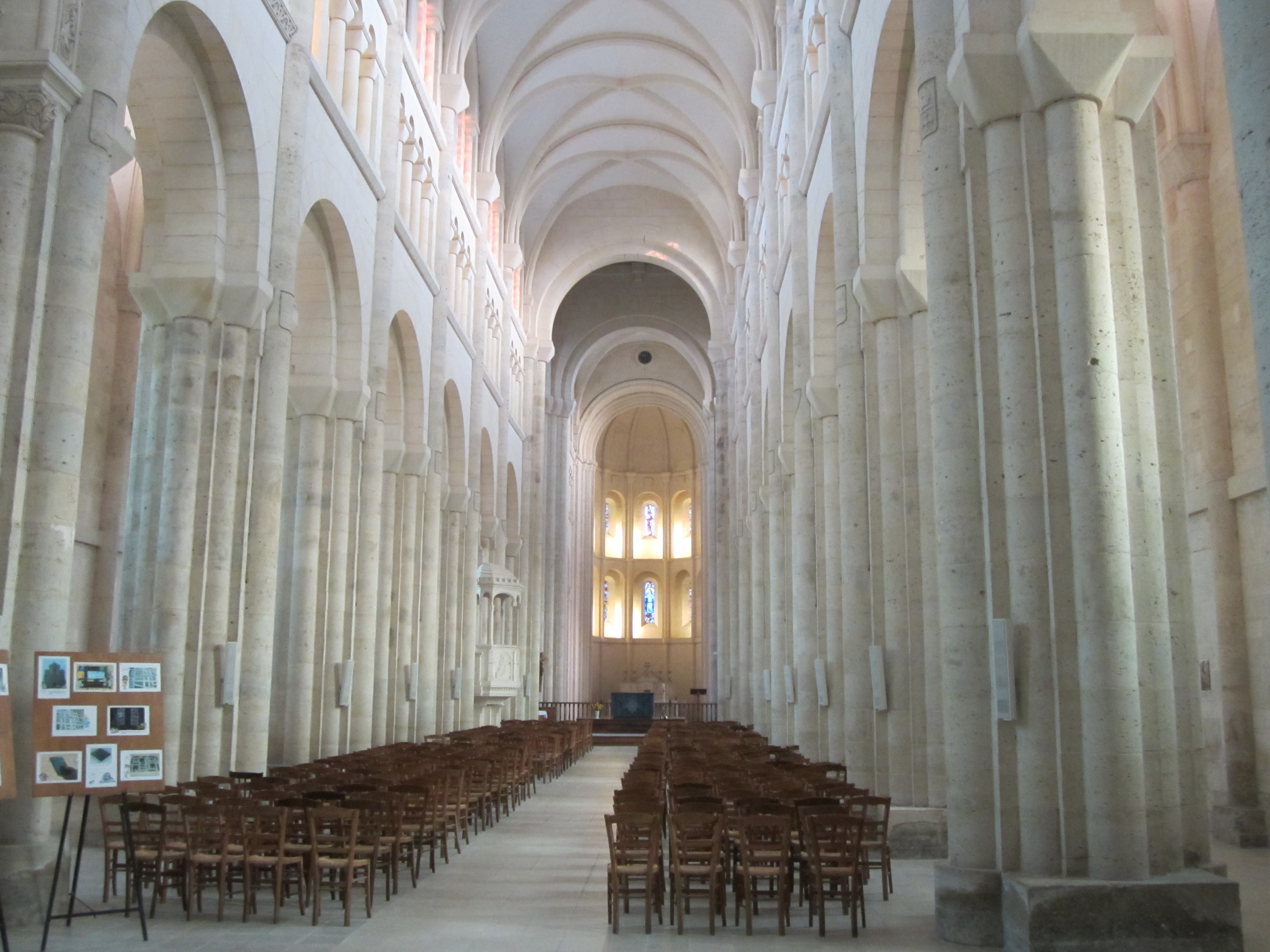
File:Abbaye_de_Montebourg_-_Nef.JPG

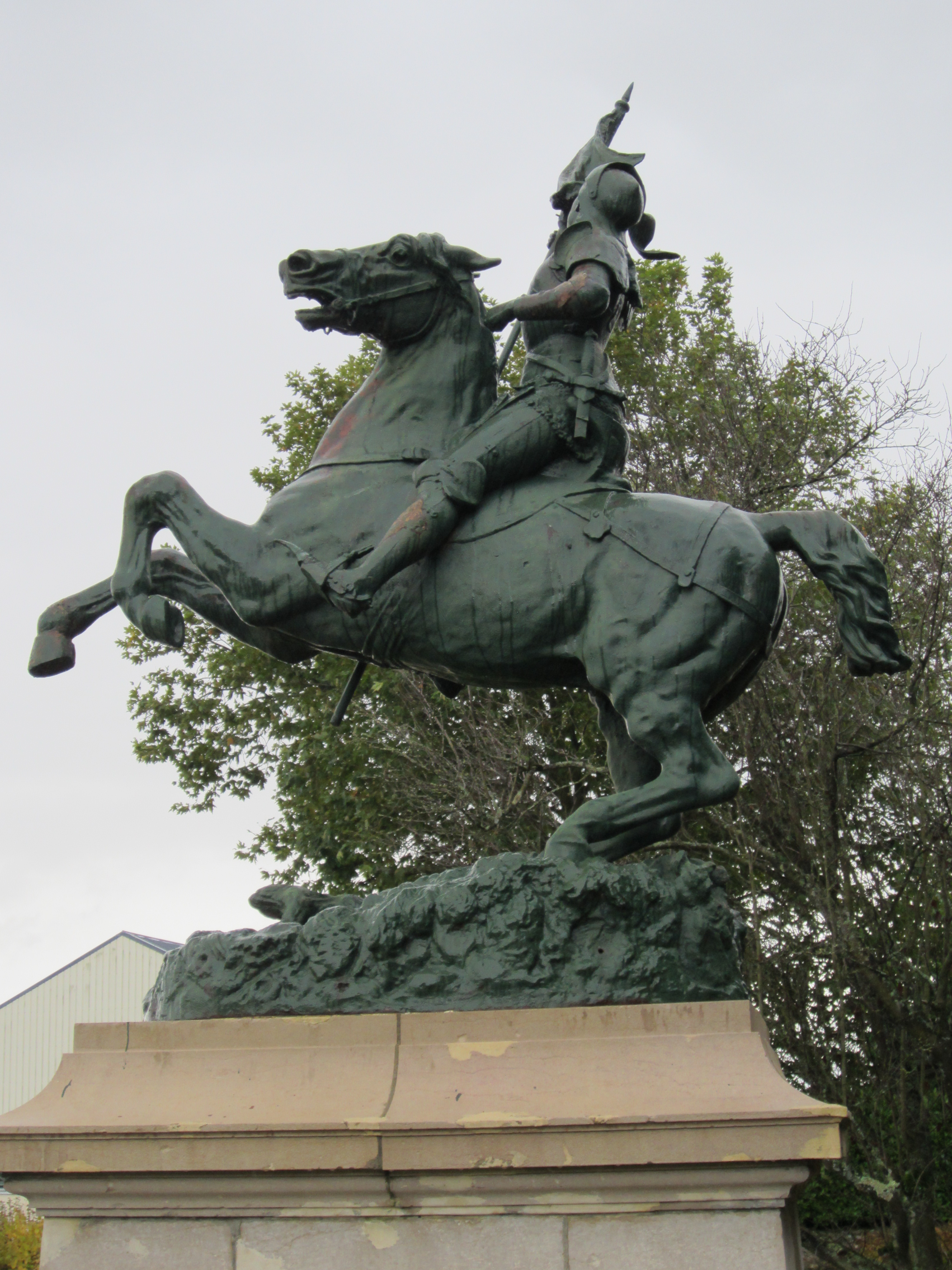
File:Montebourg_-_Statue_équestre_de_Jeanne_d'Arc_(4).JPG

== See also ==
- Communes of the Manche department
