= List of churches, chapels and meeting halls in the Channel Islands =

This is a list of churches, chapels and meeting halls in the Channel Islands

== First millennium ==
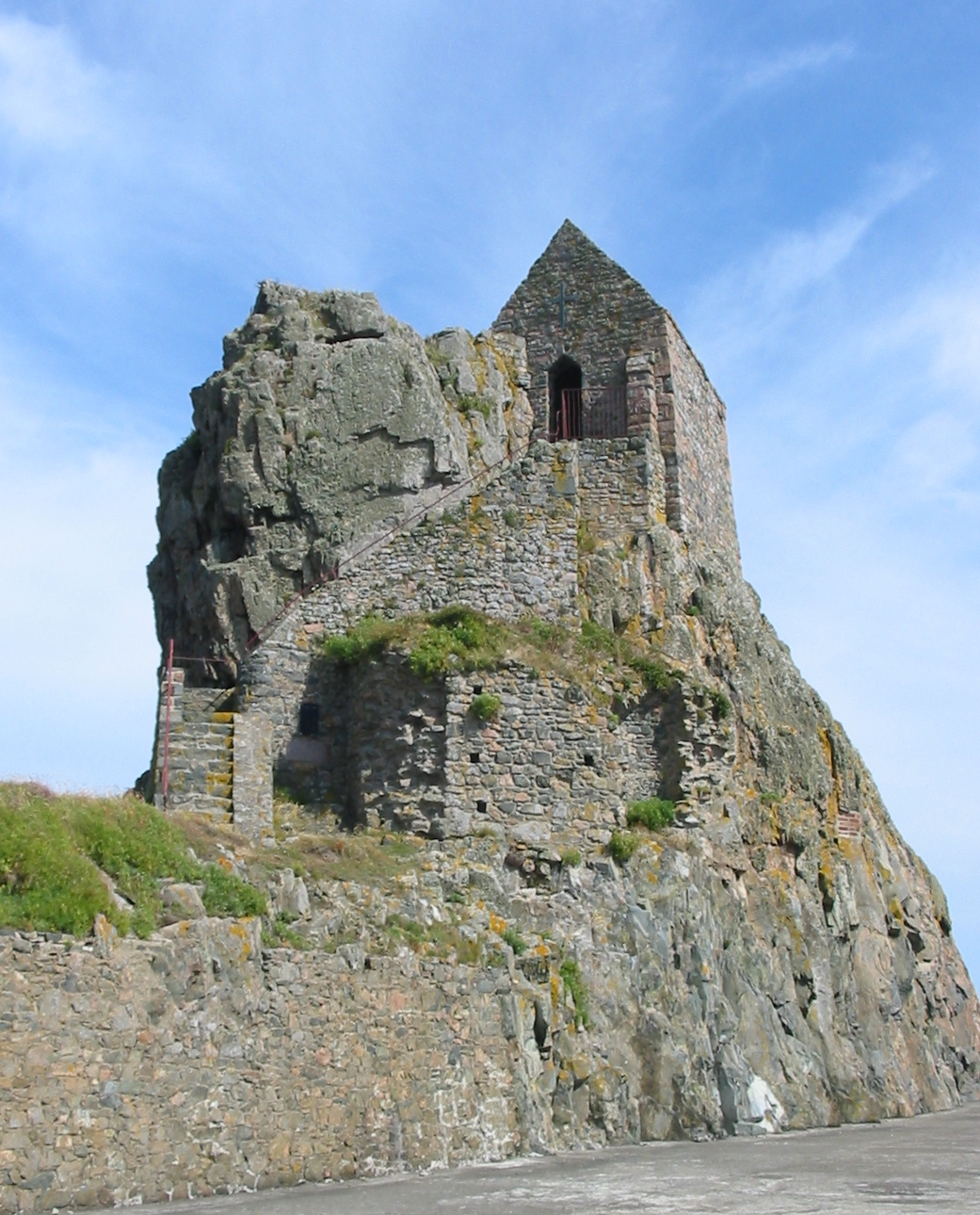
The Hermitage of Saint Helier

Although there are indications that missionary efforts created small places of Christian worship in various places in the islands before 450 A.D. the first proper evidence of Christianity is recorded as coming to the Islands around 520 A.D. when Samson of Dol visited Guernsey and in 540 A.D. when Helier arrived in Jersey, living as a hermit until he was killed by pirates.

The "pirates" grew in strength. In 911 A.D., a group of "pirates", or Vikings led by Rollo besieged Paris and Chartres. After a victory near Chartres on 26 August, Charles the Simple decided to negotiate with Rollo, resulting in the Treaty of Saint-Clair-sur-Epte. For the Vikings' loyalty, they were granted all the land between the river Epte and the sea, as well as Brittany, which at the time was an independent country which France had unsuccessfully tried to conquer. Rollo also agreed to be baptised and to marry Charles' daughter, Gisela. The land would become known as "Normandy", the land of the North Men and included "Les Îles d'la Manche" or the Channel Islands. Religion was strengthened with the arrival and conversion of the Normans to Christianity, in the 10th century.

== Second millennium ==
There were many churches built by the Normans in the 11th and 12th centuries, many on top of previous chapels which were themselves alongside pagan places of worship, the islands being divided up into parishes in the 11th century and land areas granted by endowment to French-based religious centres, Mont Saint Michel Abbey received four and Marmoutier Abbey, Tours six from Guernsey, Cerisy-la-Forêt acquired two in Jersey, but most other Jersey parishes were scattered amongst other people and institutions.

The Islands embraced the French Calvinist form of Protestantism during the Reformation Roman Catholicism continued until orders were received to remove all signs of Catholicism in 1547. A brief return to Catholicism saw the three women turned into martyrs before another turn, back to the Protestant faith and a fear of France and Catholics. Methodism took a stronghold at the end of the 18th century.

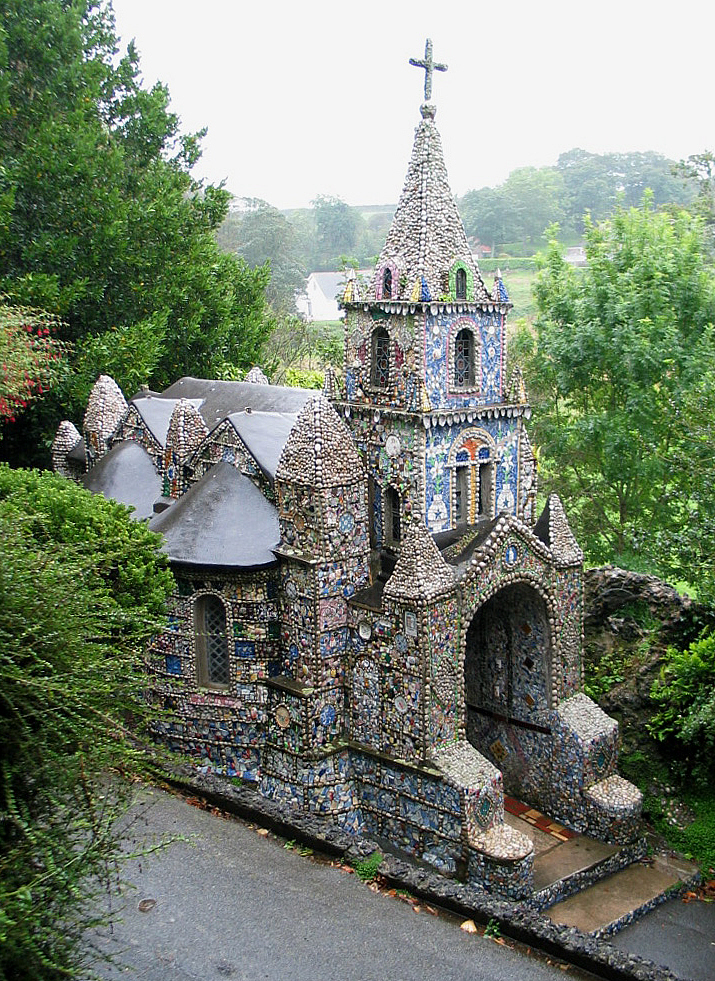
Little Chapel, Guernsey

The Little Chapel in Guernsey has been said that it "is the smallest functioning chapel in Europe, if not the world", and it is "believed to be the world’s smallest consecrated church."

At least three churches in Guernsey have pre-history carved stones, the most famous being La Gran'mère du Chimquière. In Jersey, at La Hougue Bie a 12th-century chapel was built on a Neolithic ritual site which was in use around 3500 BC. In Western Europe, it is one of the largest and best preserved passage graves. Several churches, including Castel Church, Guernsey, have been built using materials dating back to the Roman Empire. St Saviour Church in Guernsey has a number of tunnels running underneath, built by the Organisation Todt for Nazi Germany in the 1940s.

The historic toleration of religious minorities has led to many persecuted minorities seeking refuge in the Islands, such as Huguenots from 1548. The influx of the Protestant refugees led to Calvinism becoming the main religion, forcing a break from the Roman Catholic Diocese of Coutances in 1568 to the Bishop of Winchester. Religion became strictly enforced with physical punishments (whippings, stocks, imprisonment) and torture to get confessions for Channel Islands Witch Trials for 100 years, ending only with the Act of Uniformity 1662 of Charles II of England. In the English Civil War Guernsey, with stronger puritanical sympathies supported Parliament whereas Jersey was happy to restore episcopalian constitutions, siding with the Royalists.

A famous refugee Guernsey in 1855 was Victor Hugo who increasingly expressed anti-Catholic and anti-clerical views. Hugo counted 740 attacks on a book he wrote whilst in Guernsey, Les Misérables in the Catholic press. The last major act of non-toleration goes back to 1556, with the Guernsey Martyrs who died for their Protestant faith. The Island's toleration has left a rich legacy of churches, chapels and places of worship.

The maintenance of parish churches was, before the Reformation, the responsibility of the Catholic Church. To avoid the English Crown taking over responsibility as successor, Charles II in 1677 instructed the Guernsey churchwardens to raise monies from the parishioners.

In 1893 a religious census was undertaken in Guernsey showing around 50% of the population attended:

- Anglican – 17 places – 5,998 attendants
- French Wesleyan – 17 places – 2,989 attendants
- Salvation Army – 4 places – 1,941 attendants
- English Wesleyan – 6 places – 1,783 attendants
- English R.C. – 2 places – 1,021 attendants
- Baptist – 6 places – 663 attendants
- French R.C. – 2 places – 588 attendants
- Independent – 5 places – 533 attendants
- Brethren – 6 places – 507 attendants
- New Connexion – 1 place – 452 attendants
- Primitive Methodist – 2 places – 315 attendants
- Other – 7 places – 800 attendants

== Third millennium ==
The 2010 breakdown of followers in the Channel Islands:

- Christians 84%
- Agnostics 14%
- Atheists 1%
- Other religions 1%

In 2022 the Anglican churches moved from under Winchester, where they had been for 500 years, to the Diocese of Salisbury.

== Religions ==
- Anglicanism – The Deanery of Guernsey of the Church of England comes under the Diocese of Salisbury, but until 2015 was under the Diocese of Winchester.
- Baptists – The Baptist Christian faith has been practised in Guernsey for over 200 years.
- Church of Scotland – The Church has very few churches outside Scotland, but both Guernsey and Jersey have kirks. They were established, partly to cater for the Scottish soldiers who regularly provided garrison duties.
- Elim Pentecostal Church – For over 100 years there has been a Pentecostal Church in the Islands, with Elim expanding in the 1930s.
- Evangelicalism – Auxiliary Associations existed in Gernsey and Jersey in 1814
- Greater World Christian Spiritualism – held its first service in Jersey in 1935.
- Islam – There are no mosques or meeting places in Guernsey. Jersey has a meeting house for Muslims.
- Judaism – Jews first established a synagogue in Saint Helier in 1843.
- Jehovah's Witnesses – There is one English congregation in Guernsey. Three English congregations and one Portuguese congregation in Jersey.
- Methodism – Methodism reached Jersey in 1774. The first Methodist minister in Jersey was appointed in 1783, and John Wesley preached in Guernsey in 1787 and in Jersey in August 1789. The first Wesleyan chapel was built in Guernsey in 1788 opposite the Royal Court. Channel Islands District of the Methodist Church
- Newfrontiers – A network of evangelical charismatic churches. Represented in Guernsey.
- Portuguese Christian Mission – Established in Jersey in 2009 to cater for the Portuguese Protestant community.
- Quakers – The Religious Society of Friends believed to have been active in Jersey around 1660. Recognised in the Island in 1742. In Guernsey they formed a society in 1782.
- Roman Catholic – The Catholic parishes in the Channel Islands, along with the Isle of Wight, are part of the English Diocese of Portsmouth.
- Salvation Army – Founded in Jersey in 1879 and in Guernsey in 1881 and in Alderney in 1882. The Army's founders, Catherine and William Booth, had visited Guernsey in 1855 shortly after their marriage and preached. Marie Ozanne died for her beliefs in Guernsey in 1943.
- United Reformed Church was formed in 1972 when the Presbyterian Church of England and the Congregational Church of England came together. Presbyterian churches have served the Islands for over 100 years.
- Zion Christian Fellowship – Founded in Guernsey in 1988.

== List of buildings ==
This list is incomplete. Please feel free to expand it.

Name	Parish/Place	Island	Date/Era	Denomination	Website	Listed Building
Alderney Methodist Church	St Anne	Alderney	1813	Methodist	Alderney	
Alderney Salvation Army	St Anne	Alderney	1882	Salvation Army	Alderney SA	
All Saints	St Helier	Jersey	1835	Anglican	All Saints	P LB
Belmont Gospel Hall	St Helier	Jersey				
Bethesda Strict Baptist Church	Forest	Guernsey	1904	Baptist		
Bethesda Methodist Church	St Peter	Jersey	1867	Methodist	Bethesda	LB 4
Bethlehem Church	St Mary	Jersey	1828	Methodist	Bethlehem	LB 3
Bordeaux Methodist Church	Vale	Guernsey		Methodist	Bordeaux	
Chapelle Notre Dame	Chausey	Chausey	1850	Roman Catholic		
Church on the Rock	St Sampson	Guernsey	20C	Newground	Rock	
Cobo Mission Hall	Castel	Guernsey		Brethren (Evangelical)	Cobo Mission Hall	
Delancey Elim	St Sampson	Guernsey	20C	Elim	Delancey Elim	
Delisles Methodist Church	Castel	Guernsey	1919	Methodist	Delisles	
Ebenezer Church	Trinity	Jersey	1892	Methodist	Ebenezer	
Eldad Elim	St Peter Port	Guernsey	1936	Elim	Eldad Elim	
Elim Rock	St Saviour	Jersey		Elim	Elim Rock	
Fishermen's Chapel	St Brelade	Jersey	11C	Anglican	Fishermans Chapel	
Forest United Methodist Church	Forest	Guernsey		Methodist	Forest United	
Fortress (The)	Vale	Guernsey	1976	Salvation Army	Salvation Army	
Freedom Centre	St Helier	Jersey		Evangelical	Freedom Centre	
Friends Meeting House	St Helier	Jersey	1872	Quakers	Friends	
Galaad Methodist Church	Castel	Guernsey	1926	Methodist	Galaad	
Georgetown Methodict Church	St Saviour	Jersey	1873	Methodist	Georgetown	LB 3
Greater World Christian Spiritualism	St Helier	Jersey	1938	Greater World Christian Spiritualism	Greater World	
Guernsey Quaker Meeting House	St Peter Port	Guernsey		Quakers	Quakers	
Holy Trinity Church	St Peter Port	Guernsey	1789	Anglican	Holy Trinity	PB
Islamic Community Centre	St Helier	Jersey		Islam	Islamic Trust	
Jersey Baptist Church	St Helier	Jersey	1864	Baptist	Jersey Baptist	LB 3
Jersey Jewish Congregation	St Brelade	Jersey	1961	Jewish	Jersey Jewish	
Kingdom Hall of Jehovah's Witnesses	St Sampson	Guernsey		Jehovah's Witnesses	Jehovah's Witnesses	
Kingdom Hall of Jehovah's Witnesses	St Brelade	Jersey	1985	Jehovah's Witnesses	Jehovah's Witnesses	
Kingdom Hall of Jehovah's Witnesses	St Helier	Jersey		Jehovah's Witnesses	Jehovah's Witnesses	
La Rocque Methodist Church	Grouville	Jersey	1838	Methodist	La Rocques	LB 3
La Villiaze Church	St Andrew	Guernsey		Evangelical Congregational	La Villiaze	
Les Adams Methodist Church	St Peter	Guernsey		Methodist	Les Adams	
Les Camps Methodist Church	St Martin	Guernsey		Methodist	Les Camps	
Les Capelles Methodist Church	St Sampson	Guernsey	1817	Methodist	Les Capelles	
Lighthouse Christian Church	St Helier	Jersey		Evangelical	lighthouse	
Little Chapel	St Andrew	Guernsey	1914	Interdenominational	Little Chapel	
Monnaie Chapel (The Chapel of Christ the Healer)	St Andrew	Guernsey		Christian Healing		
New Life Church	St Saviour	Guernsey	1992	FIEC	New Life Church	
Notre Dame Du Rosaire	St Peter Port	Guernsey	1829	Roman Catholic	Notre Dame	
Our Lady of the Annunciation	St Martin	Jersey	1863	Roman Catholic	Our Lady Annunciation	
Our Lady Star of the Sea, Delancey	St Sampson	Guernsey	1879	Roman Catholic	Our Lady Star	
Philadelphie Church	St Peter	Jersey	1825	Methodist	Philadelphie	LB 3
Quennevais Evangelical Church	St Brelade	Jersey		Evangelical	Quennevais	
Rohais Methodist Church	St Andrew	Guernsey	1919	Methodist	Rohais	
St Andrew's Church	St Helier	Jersey	1926	Anglican	St Andrew’s	P LB
St Andrews de la Pommeraye (St Andrew's Church)	St Andrew	Guernsey	1284	Anglican	St Andrew's	PB
St Andrews in the Grange Kirk	St Peter Port	Guernsey	1897	Church of Scotland	St Andrews Kirk	
St Anne	St Anne	Alderney	1850	Anglican	St Anne	
St Anne and St Mary Magdalen	St Anne	Alderney		Roman Catholic		
St Apolline's Chapel	St Saviour	Guernsey	14C	Interdenominational		PB
St Aubin on the Hill	Saint Aubin	Jersey	1889	Anglican	St Aubin	P LB
St Aubin Methodist Church	St Aubin	Jersey	1817	Methodist	St Aubin Methodist	LB 3
St Bernadette	St Brelade	Jersey	1971	Roman Catholic	St Bernadette	
St Brelade's	St Brelade	Jersey	1111	Anglican	St Brelade’s	P LB
St Clement	St Clement	Jersey	1117	Anglican		P LB
St Columba Kirk	St Helier	Jersey	1857	Church of Scotland	St Columba	LB 2
St George's	St Ouen	Jersey	1880	Anglican	St George’s	P LB
St Helier	St Helier	Jersey	1341	Anglican		LB
St Helier Citadel	St Helier	Jersey		The Salvation Army	Salvation Army	
St Helier Methodist Centre	St Helier	Jersey	1846; 2000	Methodist	The Centre	LB 2
St John	St John	Jersey	1204	Anglican		LB
St John the Evangelist	St Peter Port	Guernsey	1839	Anglican		
St Joseph & St Mary	St Peter Port	Guernsey	1846	Roman Catholic	St Joseph & St Mary	PB
St Lawrence	St Lawrence	Jersey	1190	Anglican		P LB
St Luke	St Helier	Jersey	1848	Anglican	St Luke	P LB
St Marguerite de la Foret (Forest Church)	Forest	Guernsey	13C	Anglican		PB
St Marie du Castel (Castel Church)	Castel	Guernsey	1203	Anglican	Castel	PB
St Mark's	St Helier	Jersey		Anglican		P LB
Saint Martin de Grouville (Grouville Church)	Grouville	Jersey	1322	Anglican	Grouville	P LB
St Martin de Gouray	St Martin	Jersey	1116	Anglican	St Martin de Gouray	P LB
St Martin de la Bellouse (St Martins Church)	St Martin	Guernsey	1199	Anglican	St Martin	PB
St Martin's Methodist Church	St Martin	Jersey	1851	Methodist	St Martin’s Methodist	LB 3
St. Martin's Mission	St Martin	Guernsey	1906	Methodist		
St Mary	St Mary	Jersey	1320	Anglican	St Mary	P LB
St Mary & St Peter	St Helier	Jersey	1985	Roman Catholic	St Mary & St Peter	LB 3
St Matthew's (Glass Church)	St Lawrence	Jersey	1840	Anglican		LB
St Matthew's	Castel	Guernsey	1852	Anglican	St Matthew’s	
St Matthieu's Church	St Peter	Jersey	1871	Roman Catholic	St Matthieu	LB 3
St Michel du Valle (Vale Church)	Vale	Guernsey	1117	Anglican	Vale	PB
St Ouen	St Ouen	Jersey	1130	Anglican	St Ouen	P LB
St Ouen Methodist Church	St Ouen	Jersey	1871	Methodist		LB 2
St. Patrick's Church	St Clement	Jersey	1948	Roman Catholic	St Patrick	
St Paul	St Helier	Jersey	1818	Portuguese Christian Mission	St Paul’s	P LB
St. Paul's Methodist Church	Vale	Guernsey		Methodist	St Paul’s	
St Peter la Rocque (Grouville)	Grouville	Jersey	1852	Anglican	St Peter la Rocque	
St Peter Port (Town Church)	St Peter Port	Guernsey	1312	Anglican	St Peter Port	PB
St Peter's	St Peter	Jersey	1167	Anglican	St Peter	P LB
St Peter's Church	Sark	Sark	1820	Anglican	St Peter's, Sark	
St Pierre du Bois (St Peter's Church)	St Peter	Guernsey	1167	Anglican	St Pierre du Bois	PB
St Phillipe de Torteval (Torteval Church)	Torteval	Guernsey	1818	Anglican		PB
St Sampson	St Sampson	Guernsey	1111	Anglican		PB
St Sauveur (St Saviours's Church)	St Saviour	Guernsey	1154	Anglican	St Saviour	PB
St Saviour	St Saviour	Jersey	1154	Anglican		P LB
St Simon	St Helier	Jersey	1865	Anglican		P LB
St Stephen's	St Peter Port	Guernsey	1865	Anglican	St Stephen's	PB
St Thomas’ Church	St Helier	Jersey	1885	Roman Catholic	St Thomas	P LB
St Tugual's Chapel	Herm	Herm	11C	Non-denominational		
Sacred Heart	St Aubin	Jersey	1936	Roman Catholic	Sacred Heart	P LB
Samarès Methodist Church	St Clement	Jersey	1903	Methodist	Samares	LB 4
Sark Methodist Church	Sark	Sark	1797	Methodist	Sark Wesleyan	
Shiloh Church	Vale	Guernsey		Baptist	Shiloh	
Sion URC	St John	Jersey	1809	United Reformed Church	URC Jersey	LB 1
Spurgeon Baptist Church	St Peter Port	Guernsey	1888	Baptist	Spurgeon	
The Church of Jesus Christ of Latter-day Saints	St Mary	Jersey		The Church of Jesus Christ of Latter-day Saints		
Torteval Methodist Church	Torteval	Guernsey	1834	Methodist	Torteval	
Trinity Church (Holy)	Trinity	Jersey	1163	Anglican	Holy Trinity	P LB
Vazon Elim Pentecostal	Castel	Guernsey	1911	Elim	Vazon Elim	
Wesley Chapel	St Peter Port	Guernsey	1835	[Methodist]	Wesley	

- LB (Jersey Listed Building) with grade
- P LB (Jersey Potential Listed Building)
- PB (Guernsey Protected Building)

== See also ==
- Religion in Jersey
- History of the Jews in Jersey
- History of the Jews in Guernsey
- Channel Islands
