= Chapel of St Apolline, Guernsey =

14th-century church in Saint Saviour, Guernsey

Coordinates: 49°27′25″N 2°38′00″W

The Chapel of St Apolline, La Grande Rue, Saint Saviour, Guernsey is a protected building and historic monument. Constructed in the 14th century, it is still in regular use for worship. The Chapel has stood virtually unchanged for over 600 years.

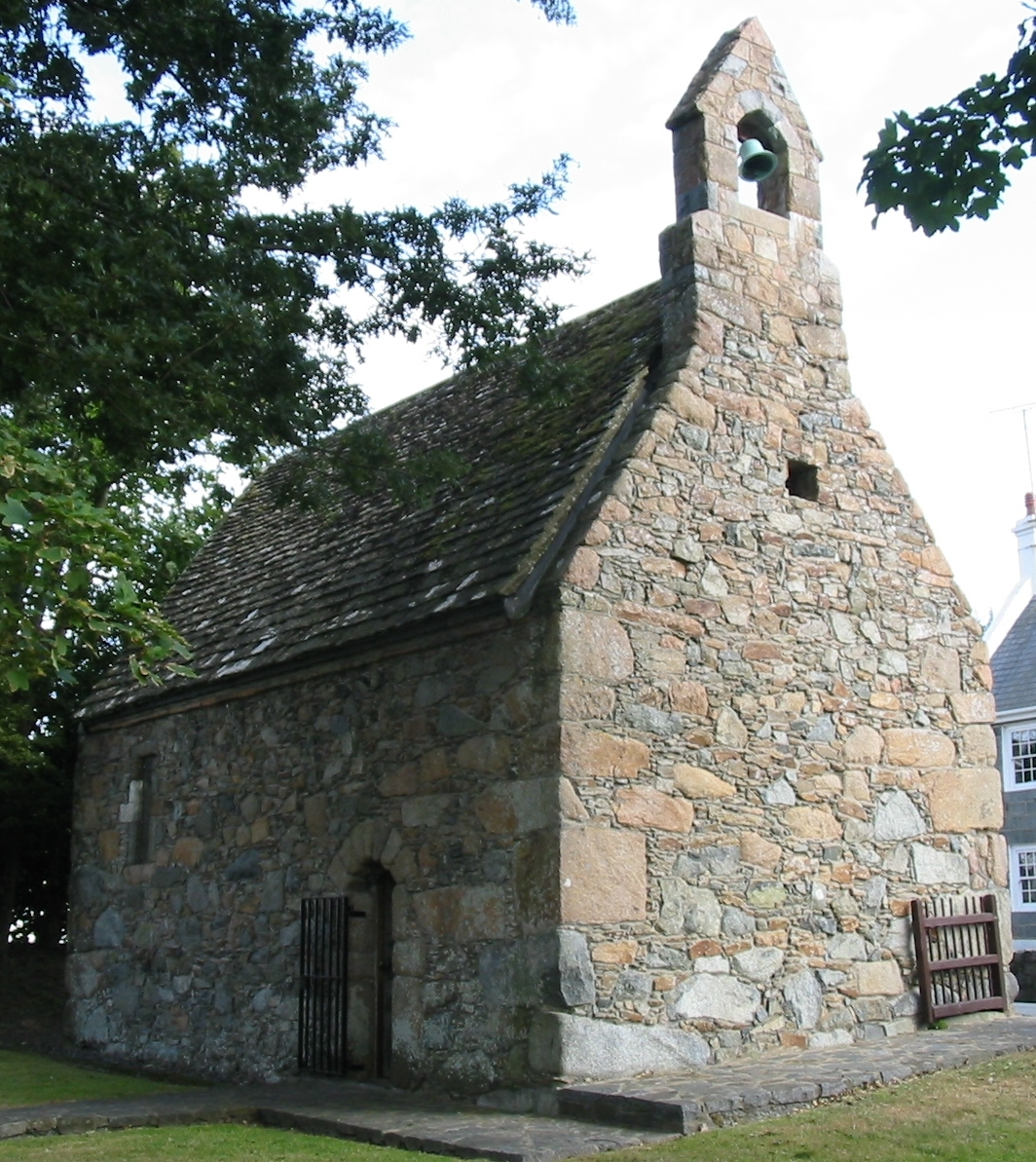
St Apolline chapel Guernsey

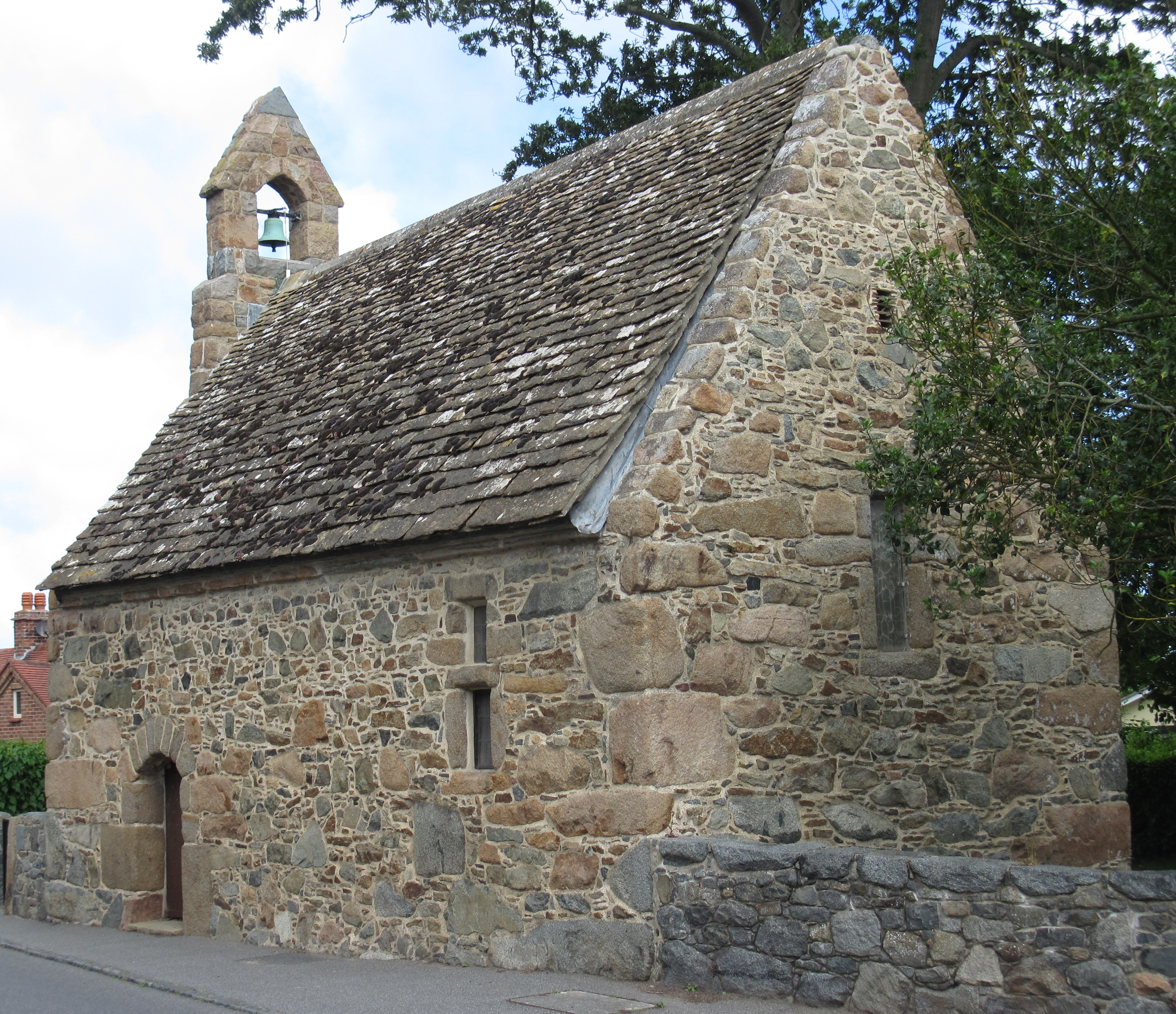
St. Apolline from roadway

== History ==
Nicholas Henry, who lived in nearby La Perelle manor, constructed the chantry chapel in 1392 and dedicated it to Saint Apolline.

According to Pope Dionysius of Alexandria, Apolline was a woman in Alexandria around A.D. 249 where Christians were being persecuted. After having her jaw and all her teeth destroyed, she threw herself into a fire, and became a martyr. She was canonised in A.D. 300 as the patron saint of dentists. A fourteenth century Dominican prayer appeals to her against the pain of toothache.

The first mention of a chapel was on 20 July 1394, when Richard II of England issued a charter mentioning la chapelle de Saint Marie de la Perelle. In 1452, the chapel is referred to as la chapelle de Notre Dame, de la Perrelle, appelleye la chapelle Sainte Appolyne.

The chapel changed hands a number of times until, with the old Catholic order being replaced during the Protestant Reformation, a Royal Commission, set up on 25 May 1563, conveyed Ste Apolline’s Chapel to Thomas Effart, who was a leading Protestant and Jurat. The building then fell into ruin, saved from demolition by its use as a stable.

A number of objects were probably hidden or taken at this time, some of which have since been recovered including a 14th-century stone figurine, 16th century cross, a silver burette for holding wine or water, two candlesticks and a bell clapper.

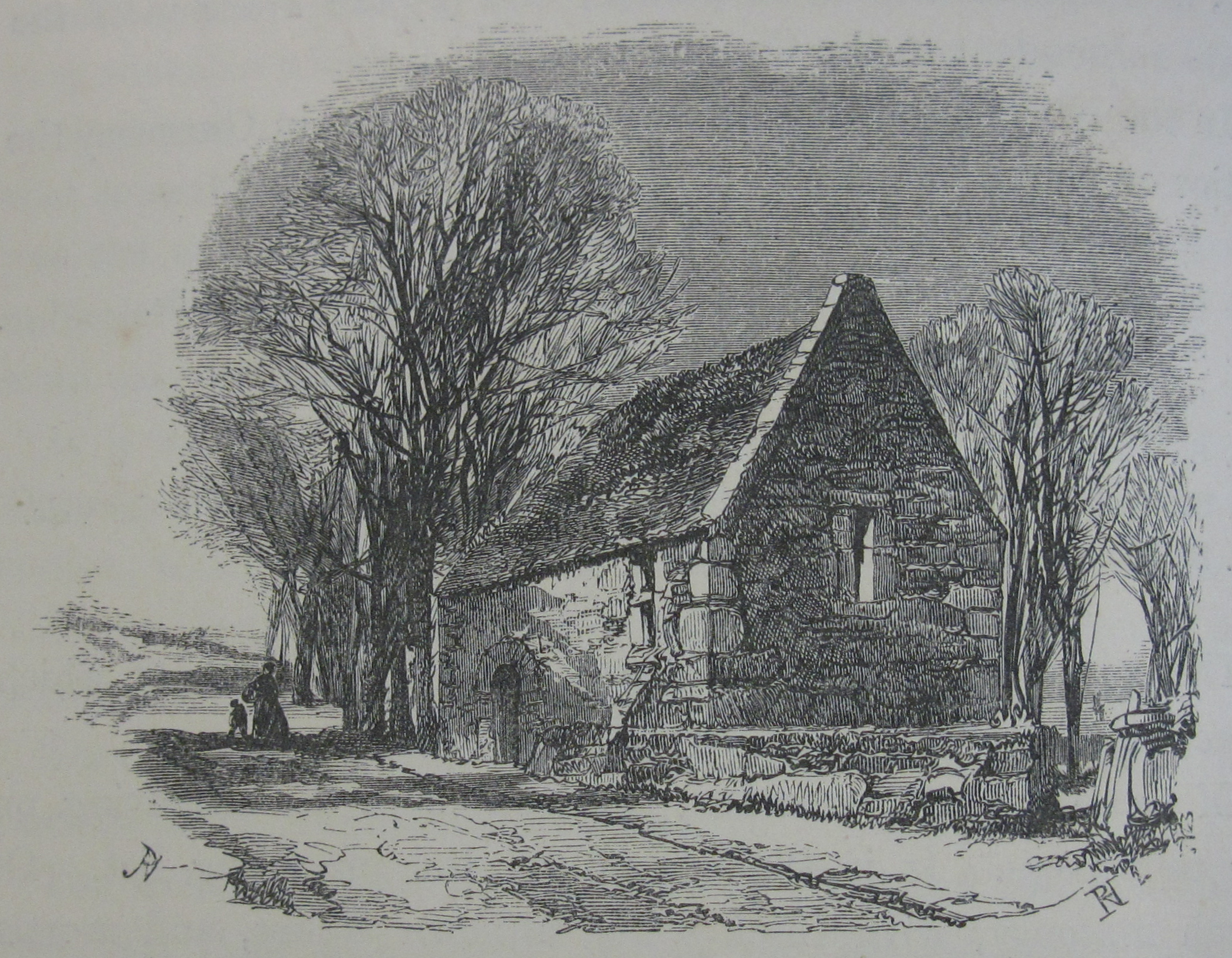
1862 drawing by Ansted & Latham

The chapel appears on the 1787 Duke of Richmond’s map of Guernsey by William Gardner on a plot of three Vergée (around 1.2 acres) planted with an apple orchard.

The States of Guernsey bought the building and 12 perches of land (about 0.12 acre) in 1873 for £120 when it was being used as a cattle barn. It was the first such acquisition to preserve important buildings in Guernsey.

The chapel was restored in the 1970s. Under floor heating was added to try to solve the damp together with a replaced bellcote, new roof and lighting.

The damp problem was not solved, with both roof leaks and rising damp affecting the building and paintings. In 2003 proposals were made to improve the preservation of the chapel and in particular the paintings. These further improvements, including improving ventilation have since reduced the problem.

== Chapel ==
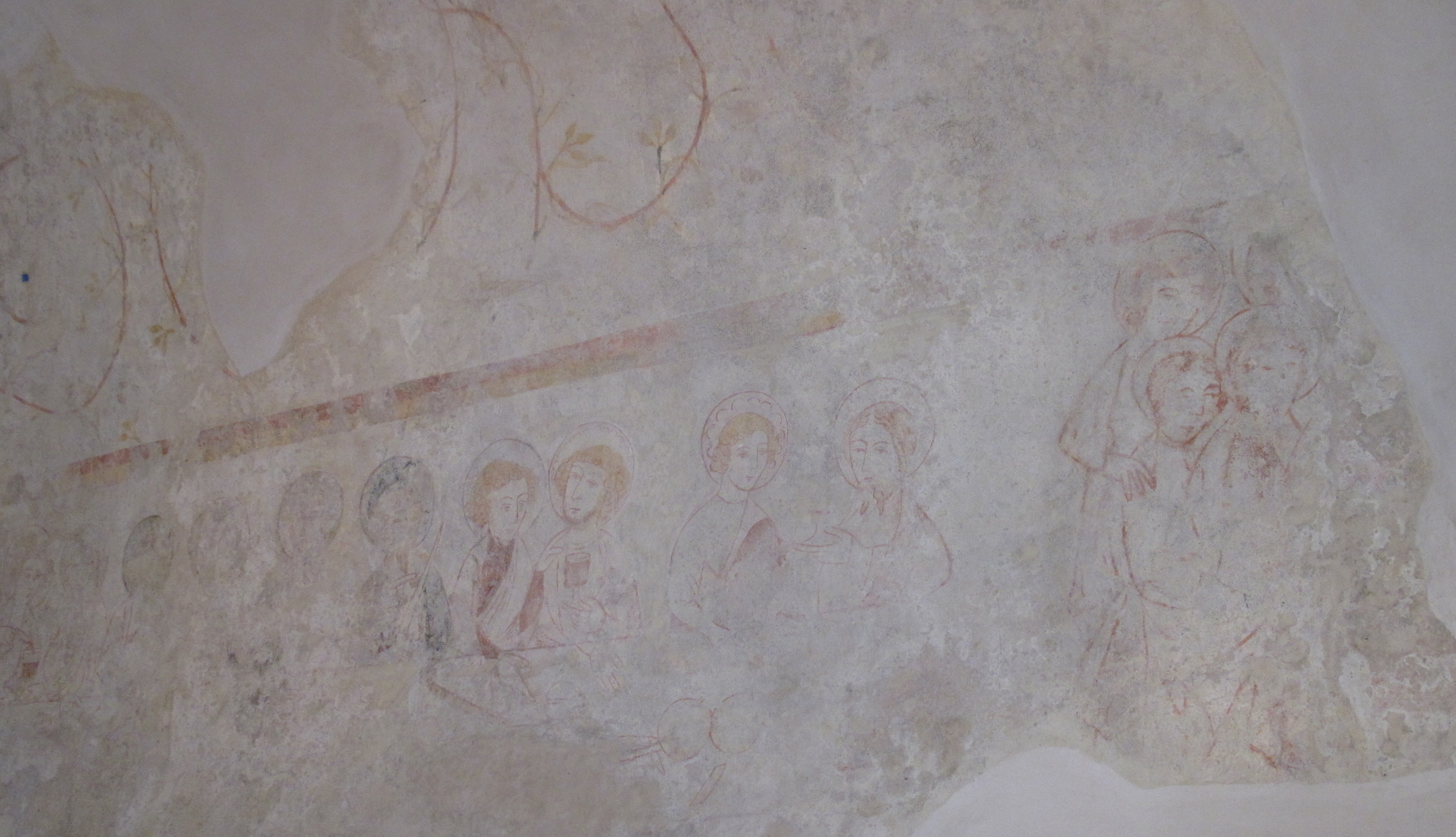
St. Apolline, 14th-century painting of the Last Supper

With 8.2m × 4.2m interior dimensions, there is seating for 14 inside the Chapel which comprises a single room with a pointed vaulted roof.

The interior of the chapel shows evidence of the original 14th-century paintings, one on the south wall depicting the last supper. another is possibly of Christ washing the feet of the Apostles. The paintings would have been created in haste, needing to complete them as the plaster dried.

The 0.75m thick walls of the chapel indicate various sources for the stone, mainly from nearby Cobo, on the west coast, there is also local Perelle stone and stone from Icart on the south of Guernsey. Stones from the more distant Chausey islands have been identified and two blocks of Caen stone, from Normandy, are used in the north window.

The Chapel is open every day to the public and is used as a place of prayer for Christian Unity. A simple place for contemplation and reflection.

There is a stained glass window in the north wall of the chapel depicting Sainte Apolline and an angel holding a tooth.

== Protection ==
The building the boundary walls and enclosed area were listed as a Protected Monument on 16 March 1938, reference PM204

== See also ==
- List of churches, chapels and meeting halls in the Channel Islands
