= History of the Jews in Guernsey =

Channel Islands
Îles Anglo-Normandes (French) Îles d'la Manche (Norman)
- Satellite photo of the Channel Islands in 2018

- Location of the Channel Islands

Geography
- Location: Western Europe
- Coordinates: 49°26′N 2°19′W
- Adjacent to: English Channel
- Total islands: 7 inhabited
- Major islands: Jersey and Guernsey
- Area: 198 km^{2} (76 sq mi)
- Highest point: Les Platons

Administration
- Bailiwick of Guernsey
- Capital and largest settlement: Saint Peter Port, Guernsey
- Area covered: 78 km^{2} (30 sq mi; 39.4%)
- Bailiwick of Jersey
- Capital and largest settlement: Saint Helier, Jersey
- Area covered: 118 km^{2} (46 sq mi; 59.6%)

Demographics
- Demonym: Channel Islander
- Population: 171,916 (2021)
- Pop. density: 844.6/km^{2} (2187.5/sq mi)

Additional information
- Time zone: Greenwich Mean Time (UTC)
  - Summer (DST): British Summer Time (UTC+1)

The location of the two Bailiwicks of Guernsey and Jersey (in red circle) form the Channel Islands in Europe

Guernsey's Jewish population has historically been much smaller than that of neighboring Jersey, and there has never been a synagogue on the island.

== Background ==
Guernsey (/ˈɡɜːrnzi/; Guernésiais: Guernési) is an island in the English Channel off the coast of Normandy. It lies roughly north of Saint-Malo and to the west of Jersey and the Cotentin Peninsula. With several smaller nearby islands, it forms a jurisdiction within the Bailiwick of Guernsey, a British Crown dependency. The jurisdiction is made up of ten parishes on the island of Guernsey, three other inhabited islands (Herm, Jethou and Lihou), and many small islets and rocks. The jurisdiction is not part of the United Kingdom, although defence and most foreign relations are handled by the British Government. The entire jurisdiction lies within the Common Travel Area of the British Islands and the Republic of Ireland, and although it is not a member of the European Union, it does have a special relationship with it, being treated as part of the European Community with access to the single market for the purposes of the free trade in goods. Taken together with the separate jurisdictions of Alderney and Sark it forms the Bailiwick of Guernsey. The two Bailiwicks of Guernsey and Jersey together form the geographical grouping known as the Channel Islands.

== Earliest Jews in Guernsey ==
A London Jew named Abraham was described in 1277 as being from "La Gelnseye" (Guernsey). A converted Portuguese Jew, Edward Brampton, was appointed Governor of Guernsey in 1482.

== World War II ==
Enemy aliens, people born in a country with which Britain was at war, were restricted from entering Britain without a permit. Accordingly, a few Jews became trapped in Guernsey when the islands were occupied. In addition, a few locals decided to remain in Guernsey rather than evacuate in June 1940.

During the occupation of the Channel Islands by Nazi Germany during World War II, laws were imposed on the authorities that required registration. All non Guernsey and British foreigners (aliens) had already been required to register with the police, but the records did not mention their faith. An advertisement appeared in the Jersey Evening Post on 21 October 1940 calling on all Jews to identify themselves:

JEWS TO REGISTER
The Bailiff said he had received two Orders from the German authorities, the first relating to measures to be taken for the registration of Jews.
This was read by the Attorney-General, and on his conclusions was lodged au Greffe and its promulgation ordered.
The Bailiff announced that he had entrusted the Chief Aliens Officer with the registration of Jews under the Order.

The Germans issued identity cards to everyone, which listed their nationality and faith. The First Order Against The Jews came two days later, on 23 October 1940, and this was the beginning of the adoption of the Nuremberg Race Laws in to the Channel Islands' legal systems. The Islands' bailiffs collaborated with the Germans. Only Sir Abraham Lainé protested against the anti-Jewish laws.

The deportation of the Jews from the Channel Islands was done with the full collaboration of the bailiffs and the government authorities. According to the grandson of Bailiff Victor Carey, Winston Churchill did not know whether to hang Carey or knight him. To hush up the level of collaboration, he was knighted, and the history of Guernsey's delivery of the Jews to the Nazis was concealed for decades.

Jews identified in Guernsey and Sark

- Elda Brouard née Bauer, 27/4/1884, British by marriage, born Italy
- Elisabet Duquemin née Fink, 21/7/1899, British by marriage, born Austria
- Auguste Spitz, 28/8/1901, German, born Austria
- Therese Steiner, 22/4/1916 German, born Austria
- Anny (Annie) Wranowsky, 22/4/1894, Czech but held German passport, living on Sark

Marianne Grunfeld, born in Kattowitz, German Empire (now Katowice, Poland) in 1912 had studied horticulture at the University of Reading before going to work on a farm in Guernsey. She was identified in April 1942 as Jewish.

Therese Steiner, a Jewish Austrian, had come to the Islands from England and become trapped in the Islands by the invasion as she had been detained as an alien, amongst 30 enemy aliens who were arrested and detained in June 1940. She did not have a UK visa, as required for immigrants from Germany and Austria (from 1938). A qualified dental nurse, she was then employed as a nurse by the States of Guernsey, working at the Castel Hospital. After 18 months she went to the German authorities to ask to contact her parents.

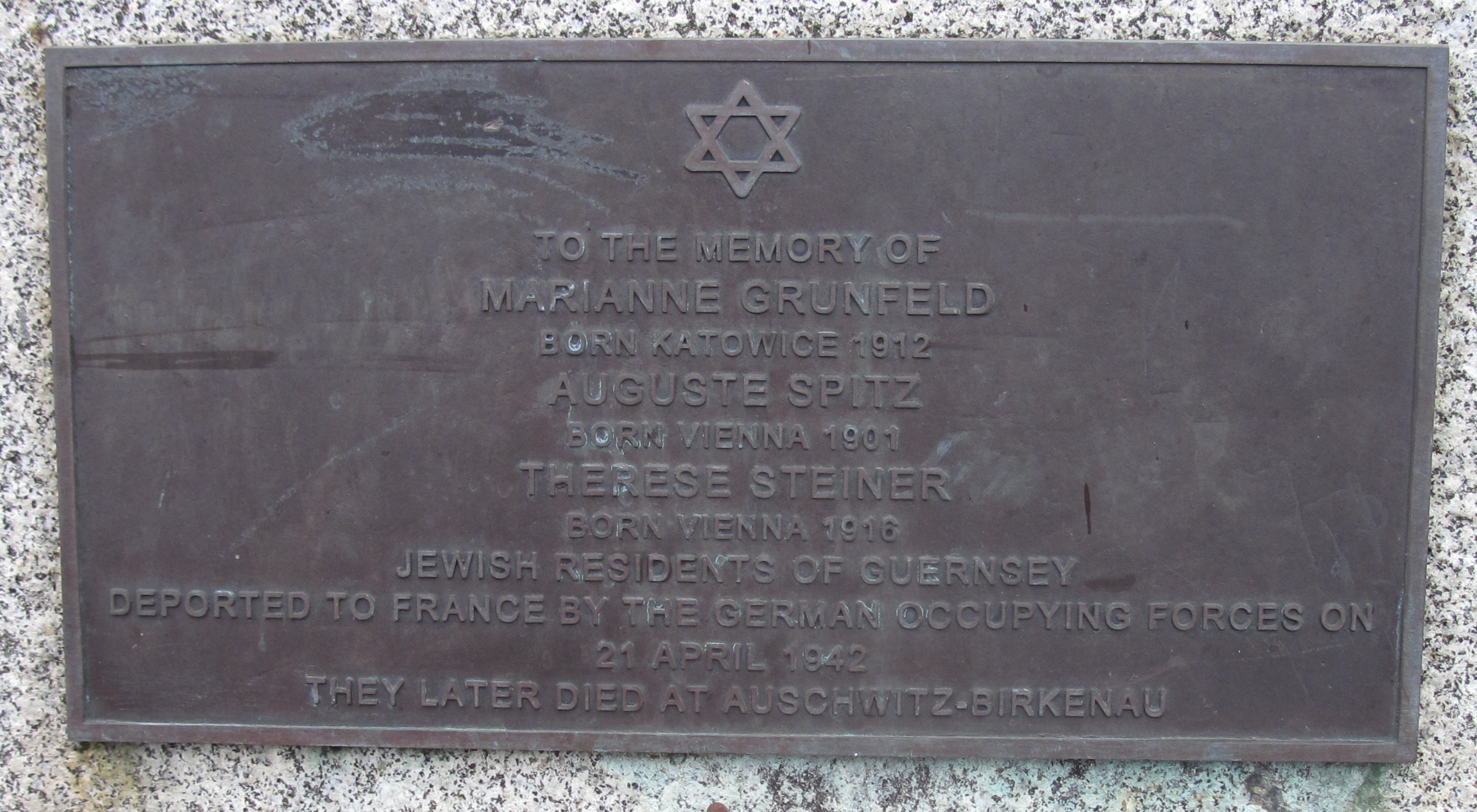
Guernsey plaque to Marianne Grunfeld, Auguste Spitz and Therese Steiner

The first group of three Jews were ordered to leave the Island in April 1942. The three, Marianne Grunfeld, Auguste Spitz, and Therese Steiner, were first sent to Saint-Malo, where they took up local employment. Marianne Grunfeld was reported to be living in Laval, France, until three months later, when they were rounded up in a mass deportation of French Jews. They were sent directly to Auschwitz, where they all died.

The second group of three, Elda Brouard, Elisabet Duquemin, and Janet Duquemin (18 months old), were sent with Henry Duquemin (husband of Elisabet) in February 1943. Henry was sent to Oflag VII-C in Laufen, Germany, and the two women and baby initially went to a prison in Compiègne and then, after six months, to Ilag V-B in Biberach an der Riss. Both of the camps in Laufen and Biberach were civilian camps containing many Channel Island civilians.

Annie Wranowsky lived on Sark throughout the war, working as a German language teacher.

Miriam Jay lived in Guernsey throughout the war, without being identified.

Sir Geoffrey Rowland, the Bailiff of Guernsey from 2005 to 2012, has stated that the government of Guernsey was powerless to stop the deportations, due to the large number of German soldiers on the island.

== Current ==
There are still some Jews living in Guernsey today, some of whom attend the congregation in Jersey. The present-day Channel Islands community, consisting of some 60 Jews was founded in 1962.

== See also ==
- History of the Jews in Jersey
- History of the Jews in the United Kingdom
- List of churches, chapels and meeting halls in the Channel Islands
