= History of the Jews in Jersey =

Channel Islands
Îles Anglo-Normandes (French) Îles d'la Manche (Norman)
- Satellite photo of the Channel Islands in 2018

- Location of the Channel Islands

Geography
- Location: Western Europe
- Coordinates: 49°26′N 2°19′W
- Adjacent to: English Channel
- Total islands: 7 inhabited
- Major islands: Jersey and Guernsey
- Area: 198 km^{2} (76 sq mi)
- Highest point: Les Platons

Administration
- Bailiwick of Guernsey
- Capital and largest settlement: Saint Peter Port, Guernsey
- Area covered: 78 km^{2} (30 sq mi; 39.4%)
- Bailiwick of Jersey
- Capital and largest settlement: Saint Helier, Jersey
- Area covered: 118 km^{2} (46 sq mi; 59.6%)

Demographics
- Demonym: Channel Islander
- Population: 171,916 (2021)
- Pop. density: 844.6/km^{2} (2187.5/sq mi)

Additional information
- Time zone: Greenwich Mean Time (UTC)
  - Summer (DST): British Summer Time (UTC+1)

The location of Jersey (in red) near the United Kingdom in Europe

The location of the two Bailiwicks of Guernsey and Jersey (in red circle) form the Channel Islands in Europe

The history of the Jews in Jersey dates back to at least the 1790s. There was a community in Jersey from the 1840s. The Jersey Old Hebrew Congregation was founded in 1843 and closed around 1870.

As of 2015 there were about 85 Jews living in Jersey, although the number was thought to be shrinking. In 2021, the island's Synagogue experienced significant growth in its membership, following the arrival of several new Jewish families.

== World War Two ==
Enemy aliens, people born in a country with which Britain was at war, were restricted from entering Britain without a permit. Accordingly, a few of Jewish faith became trapped in Jersey when the islands were occupied. In addition, a few locals decided to remain in Jersey rather than evacuate in June 1940.

Following the invasion of 1940, Jersey was forced to pass laws by the German occupiers, requiring the identification of Jews. All non-Jersey and -British foreigners (aliens) had already been required to register with the police, but the records did not mention their faith. An advertisement appeared in the Jersey Evening Post on 21 October 1940 calling on all Jews to identify themselves:

JEWS TO REGISTER
The Bailiff said he had received two Orders from the German authorities, the first relating to measures to be taken for the registration of Jews.
This was read by the Attorney-General, and on his conclusions was lodged au Greffe and its promulgation ordered.
The Bailiff announced that he had entrusted the Chief Aliens Officer with the registration of Jews under the Order.

The Germans issued identity cards to everyone, which listed their nationality and faith.

"Jews", under the Nazi definition, identified on Jersey:

- Victor Emanuel 4 September 1870; British by naturalisation, born Germany; resident in Jersey for 2 years
- John Finkelstein 12 March 1882; Romanian; resident in Jersey for 8 years
- Samuel Selig Simon 3 June 1862; British, born in Jersey
- Nathan Davidson 16 August 1881; Egyptian by naturalisation, born Romania; resident in Jersey for 5 years
- Marianne Blampied 27 August 1887; British by marriage, born Holland; resident in Jersey for 2 years
- John Jacobs 29 September 1883; British; resident in Jersey for 17 years
- Theresa Marks 15 October 1862; born in Jersey
- Ruby Ellen Still 4 July 1887; British; resident in Jersey for 30 years
- Hyam Goldman 18 May 1869; British; resident in Jersey for 32 years
- Hedwig Bercu 23 June 1919; Romanian, born Austria; resident in Jersey for 2 years
- Margarete Hurban 16 April 1909; German, born Austria; resident in Jersey for 3 years
- Esther Pauline Lloyd 31 July 1906; British; resident in Jersey for 3 years

The following were shipped out of Jersey in February 1943, following a report by Dr. Casper dated 17 June 1942, and sent to Lager Compiègne in France:

- Alfred Bertie Still (husband of Ruby) and then to Laufen, Germany, a survivor
- Ruby Ellen Still and then to Biberach an der Riss Ilag V-B, a survivor
- Michael Lewis Still (son of Alfred and Ruby) and then to Biberach an der Riss Ilag V-B, a survivor
- John Max Finkelstein and then to Buchenwald Concentration Camp and finally in April 1945 to Theresienstadt concentration camp, where he was among the survivors.
- Esther Pauline Lloyd and then to Biberach an der Riss Ilag V-B, returned to Jersey in April 1944.

The camps in Laufen and Biberach were civilian camps containing many Channel Island civilians.

Nathan Davidson was admitted to a Jersey's mental hospital in February 1943 and died in 1944, while Victor Emanuel committed suicide.

== Current ==
After the war, there was a revival of Jewish life in Jersey, founded in 1961 with its synagogue opened in 1972, is located in Saint Brélade.

As of 2004, Jewish population was estimated at 120. There are currently about 85 Jews living in Jersey; this number was thought to be declining.

== See also ==
- History of the Jews in Guernsey
- History of the Jews in the United Kingdom
- List of churches, chapels and meeting halls in the Channel Islands
