= List of museums in Guernsey =

This is a list of museums in Guernsey, Channel Islands.

== The list ==
Name	Image	Parish	Type	Summary
Artparks Sculpture Park		St Martin's	Art	Operated by Charles Saumarez Smith
Castle Cornet		St Peter Port's	Military	
Folk & Costume Museum Guernsey		St Martin's	Folk & Costume	website, operated by the National Trust of Guernsey
Fort Grey		St Peter	Castle	
Fort Hommet		St Peter Port	Military	
German occupation Museum		Les Houards Forest	History	website
The Maritime Museum		St Peter Port's	Maritime	website Closed for roof renovation in 2019
Royal Guernsey Militia Museum		St Peter Port's	Military	website
Sausmarez Manor		St Martin's	Historic house	website
No. 201 Squadron RAF Museum		St Peter Port's	Military	website
