= Icart =

Icart may refer to:

- Icart Point, a point in southern Guernsey
- Louis Icart (1888-1950), a French painter, graphic artist and illustrator
- Luys Ycart (fl. 1396–1433), also spelled Lluís Icart, Catalan poet
- Martín Icart (* 1984), Uruguayan footballer
