= Artparks Sculpture Park =

Sculpture trail in Guernsey, Channel Islands

ArtParks Sculpture Park
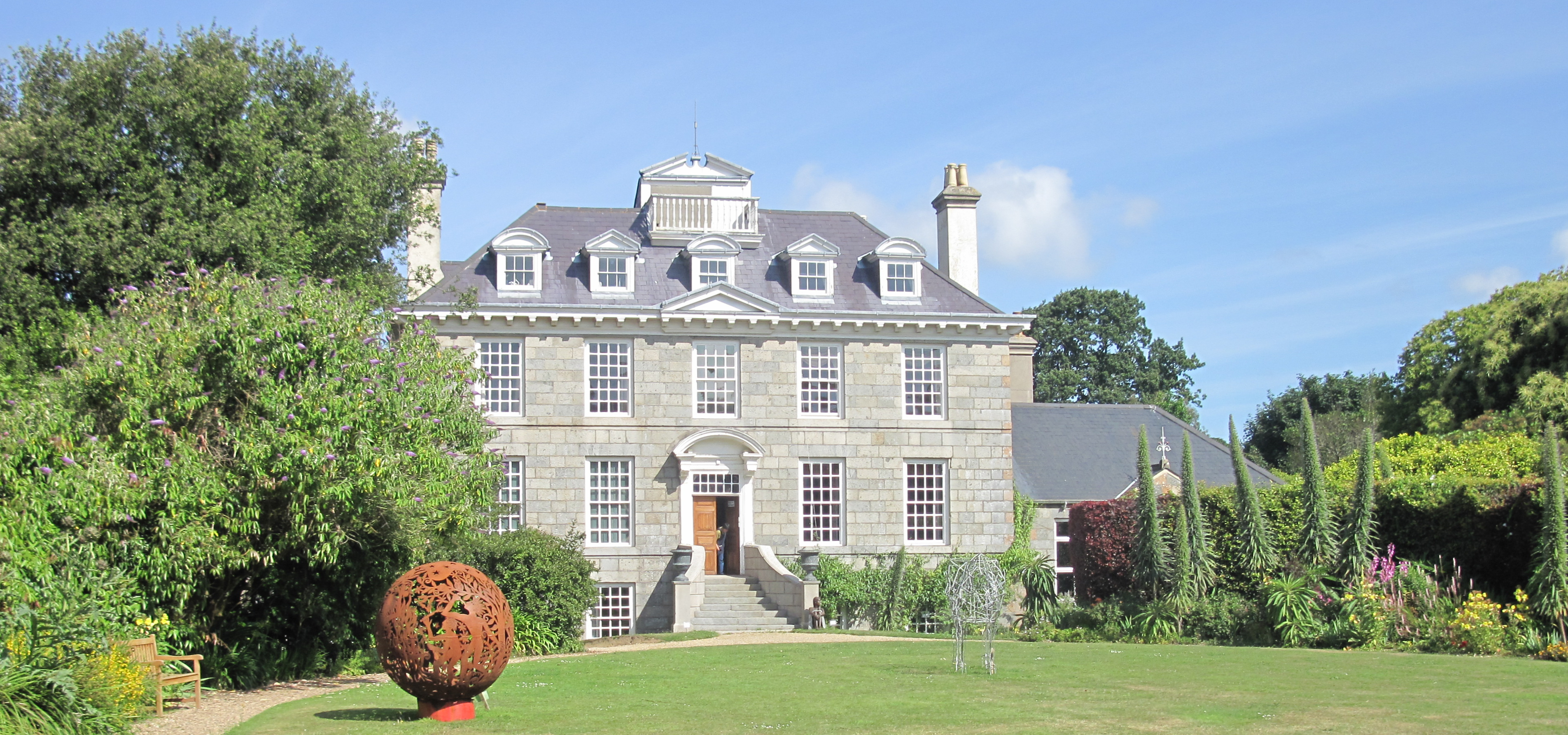
- Sculptures on the front lawn of Sausmarez Manor.
- Established: 1998
- Location: Sausmarez Manor, Saint Martin's, Guernsey, Channel Islands, British Isles
- Coordinates: 49°26′7.80″N 2°32′50.28″W
- Type: Sculpture Garden
- Collection size: <200
- Founder: Peter de Sausmarez
- Public transit access: La Route de Sausmarez
- Parking: On site (no charge)
- Website: http://www.artparks.co.uk

The ArtParkS Sculpture Park sculpture trail is located in Saint Martin's, Guernsey, Channel Islands, in the grounds of the historic Sausmarez Manor.

It shows up to 200 mostly contemporary sculptures every year by approximately 70-80 artists from the United Kingdom and around the world. It was opened by Charles Saumarez Smith CBE, who at the time was the director of the National Portrait Gallery in London. The selection of sculpture is set in a sub tropical garden and changes every year with a grand opening, usually around the third week in May. Amenities include free parking, a bus stop and a cafe.

== Founding and funding ==
The ArtParkS Sculpture Park was founded in 1998 by Peter de Sausmarez and is self-funding.

== Exhibits ==
Occasionally solo exhibitions are shown. Most of the sculpture is for sale and there are some sculptures that are semi-permanent. There are occasional guided tours of the sculptures at certain times of the year.

== Artists ==
Some of the sculptural artists who have exhibited to date are:

Marie Ackers	Carol Acworth	Zakir Ahmedov	Neale Andrew
Carole Andrews	"Anon Of The East"	"Anon Of The Orient"	Yanina Antsulevich
Halliday Avray-Wilson	Nicola Axe	Felicity Aylieff	Lida Baas
Patrick Barker	Ben Barrell	Nicola Beattie	David Begbie
Robin Bell	Alison Bell	Dawn Benson	Vega Bermejo Castelnau
Alan Biggs	Adam Binder	Timothy Blackwood	Robert Bowers
Monika Brors	Gill Brown	Thomas Brown	Dick Budden
Heather Burnley	James Butler	Perryn Butler	Ronald Cameron
Fiona Campbell	Alan Card	David Cemmick	Daniel Clahane
Peter M Clarke	Michael Cooper	David Corbett	Sophie Courtiour
Giorgie Cpajak	Sean Crampton	Helle Rask Crawford	Judy Ann Cropper
Anne Curry	Nicholas B. Daddazio	Anton Dala	Stephanie Davies-Arai
Virginia Day	Ben Dearnley	Martin Debenham	Helen Denerley
Kate Denton	Shirley Diamond	Aragorn Dick-Read	Martin Duffy
Sukey Erland	Abbey Evans	Angela Farquharson	Richard Fenton
Graham Findlay	Tim Fortune	Christine Fox	Donald Foxley
Hilary Frew	Paul Gervis	Olwen Gillmore	Ginger Gilmour
Nicola Godden	Badri Goguadze	Dr. Nicholas Gold	David Goode
Amy Goodman	Ben Greenwood	Hans Grootswagers	Paula Groves
Simon Gudgeon	Helen Gyngell	Elisabeth Hadley	Veda Hallowes
Priscilla Hann	Mark Yale Harris	John Hawkwood	Martin Hayward-Harris
Michie Herbert	Alan Herriot	Brendan Hesmondhalgh	Silas Higgon
Michael Hipkins	Barbara Hodgkins	Beatrice Hoffman	Kirk Hogben
Andrew Horsfall	Deirdre Hubbard	Jon Barlow Hudson	John Huggins
Lynda Hukins	Marko Humphrey-Lahti	Angela Hunter	Christa Hunter
Graham Ibbeson	Alan Jack	Philip Jackson	Abu Jafar
K. Jane Jones	Tom Joynson	Jerzy Kędziora	Simon Keeley
Lucy Kinsella	Robert Koenig	Phillip Kotokwa	Francony Kowalski
Bozena Krol Legowska	Alistair Lambert	Charlotte Lauer	William Lazard
Jason Le Noury	Christine Lee	Nick Lloyd	Margaret Lovell
Peter Lyell Robinson	Michael Lyons	Andrew MacCallum	Simon Mahoney
Rob J Maingay	Tom Maley	Vivien Mallock	Chris Manley
Jane McAdam Freud	Jennie McCall	Lorne Mckean	Margot McMahon
Jesse Merton-Richards	Ev Meynell	Robert Mileham	Sheila Mitchell
Pete Moorhouse	Nick Moran	Nicolas Moreton	Dave Morris
Gail Morris	Moudoir	Peter Moulton	Terry New
Peter Newsome	Peter Nicholas	Piers Nicholson	Gudrun Nielsen
Doru Nuta	Adam Oliver	John Cyril O`Connor	Jeremy Palmer
Marilyn Panto	Gill Parker	Anna Louise Parker	Gary Pickles
Guy Portelli	Kenneth Potts	Tanya Preminger	Bill Prickett
Orhan Rashtana	Janis Ridley	Paul Riley	Sue Riley
Patrícia Riveras	Mike Roles	Rogier Ruys	Timothy Shutter
Helen Sinclair	Paul Smith	Michael Speller	Antonia Spowers
Geoffrey Stinton	Elizabeth Studdert	Jilly Sutton	Barry Sutton
Jan Sweeney	Brian Taylor	Richard Thornton	Peter Thursby
Todor Todorov	Sarah Tombs	Ian Turnock	Tania Ivanova Tzanova
Pippa Unwin	Jennifer Urmenyi	Marcelle Van Bemmel	Henk Van Putten
Roman Velihurskiy	Patricia Volk	Emma Walker	Mick Watson
Esther Wertheimer	Alex Wheeler	Diana Whelan	Paul Wilson
Tolleck Winner	Faith Winter	Olive Wootton	Wrightson and Platt
Jonathan Wylder	Peter Wylly	Althea Wynne	Jenny Wynne Jones
Rafael Zabala	Ans Zondag		

== Hours of operation ==
Artparks Sculpture Garden is open daily, from 10am to 5pm. There is a small charge for admission and free loan guides to the sculpture park available.
