= Jerbourg Point =

Peninsula in Guernsey, Channel Islands

Coordinates: 49°25′16″N 2°32′5″W

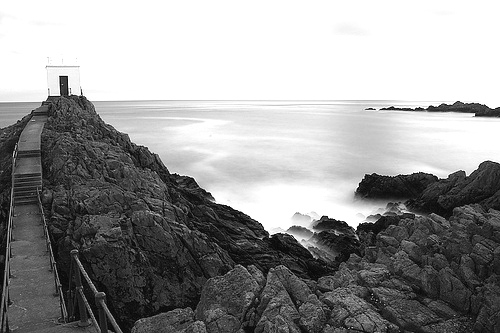
Jerbourg Point, the southeastern point of Guernsey,

Jerbourg Point or the Jerbourg Peninsula is the southeastern point of the Bailiwick of Guernsey in the English Channel off the coast of Normandy, lying within St Martin Parish. It marks the end of the east coast cliffs and beginning of the south coast cliffs. It provides scenic views of the Little Russel and the various islands.

== History ==
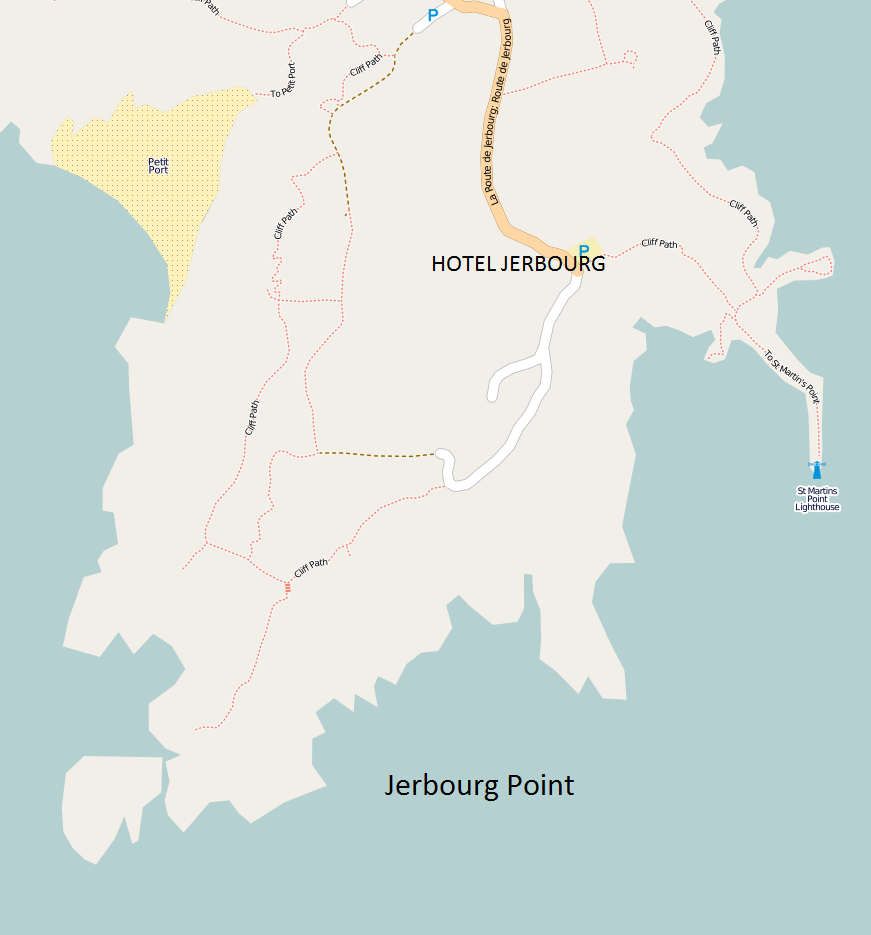
Map of the Jerbourg Peninsula

People have lived on this point since Neolithic times and further during the Bronze Age and Medieval age. It thus has a long history of habitation and defence system establishment, in the form of mounds and ditches, given its strategic location.

Along the narrowest part of Jerbourg promontory's isthmus, there are earthworks fashioned as a defensible camp or fort. According to Gustave Jules Dupont in Histoire du Cotentin et de ses îles (1870), "they begin on the west side at the summit of the cliff at the head of the path from Petit Port... " Of the three embankments, the outer ones are the deepest, measuring approximately 8 feet (2.4 m). The embankments extend towards Doyle's Monument. Three ramparts are located on the east slope with the two northern ones being close together. Flint-chipping debris, arrowheads, Celtic pottery, stone axes, mullers, and an unfinished double-headed stone hammer have been found. The Guille-Allès Museum houses a flint arrowhead from this location.

=== Neolithic ===
Pottery has been found in various parts of Jerbourg Point. Stone instruments, flint knives and 10 arrow-heads from the Late Neolithic/Early Bronze Age period, 2000 BC have been discovered in the earthworks, which extend from Bay Portelet on the west to La Bate des Murs near Le Bee du Nez.

A ditch was created, using a natural fault line across the narrowest part of the Jerbourg peninsular, which at this point is about 400m wide, ending on both sides with cliffs steep enough to not need flanking defences, with the base on the bedrock. There is an inner bank, originally maybe 3m high, which lies on the bedrock, faced with stones held together with clay.

=== Bronze Age ===
Around 1,200 BC an improved and probably taller wall was placed in front of the existing wall, made of larger stones fitted together in a better way. Subsequently, additional improvements were made to the front wall with five different walls in total being identified. Repairs and a third facing wall were built around 500 BC. New works around 200 BC saw a massive glacis style turf rampart built, reinforced at the front with some stones. A round bottomed ditch 1m deep and 2m wide behind the rampart on the wall was dug in the Bronze Age. Pottery, including decorated pottery, fragments have been found.

Two smaller earthworks on the tips of the Jerbourg and St Martins point headlands possible indicate defensive places of last resort, they are of unknown date.

=== Gallo-Roman ===
A Roman hoard, dating from the late 3rd century was found in the 19th century, containing 68 tetradrachms minted in Alexandria during the reigns of the emperors Probus (4 coins), Carus (3 coins), Numerian (3 coins), Carinus (4 coins), Diocletian (34 coins) and Maximian (19 coins).

=== Medieval ===
In the centuries before and after 1204, the defences may have been improved and supplemented with wooden palisades.

In 1313 an inquisition of Edward II and again in 1331 Matthew de Sausmarez was Captain of the Castle at Jerbourg and the Seigneur of the Manor of Sausmarez. There is a report of a garrison of twelve archers at Jerbourg after a battle with the French in 1338. They were all killed there.

Defence on the headland was strengthened to fend off raids from the French. This involved building a turf rampart and fighting platforms. Platforms were built inside the inner bank to take mangonels and ballistae in the 14th century.

=== 18th century ===
A signal station with a ships style mast was erected before 1795 on the point to pass messages or to raise an alarm. A tower, called Sausmarez Tower was constructed and is depicted in a drawing of the signal station. The tower was demolished around 1816.

La Moye battery was built overlooking the inaccessible Havre des Moies Bay around 1800.

A monument in the form of a column erected at this point was in honour of Sir John Doyle, former Governor of the Island, in recognition of his contribution to building a road network and creating other facilities.

=== World War II ===
A number of bomb-proof and gas-proof bunkers were built during World War II by the Germans to provide accommodation, store ammunition and control the large gun positions erected in the vicinity. Batterie Strassburg was constructed in open emplacements with four 22 cm K532 (f) French guns. A command bunker, type M132 was also constructed. The battery was manned by marines from Marine-Artillerie-Abteilung 604 and was operational by May 1942, its guns had a range of 23 kilometres (14 mi). The bunker construction adjacent to the 1807 Barracks, was fitted with a turret mounted rangefinder.

During the war, a medieval defence platform was demolished, and the Doyle Monument, which existed here, was also demolished in 1944 by the Germans, to avoid an obvious target point and to improve the 360 degree angle of fire of the guns. The monument was replaced by a smaller version only after the war.

German armaments in Batterie Strassburg:

- 4 x 22 cm K532 (f)
- 2 x 7.5cm K231 (f)
- 6 x 2cm Flak
- 1 x 3.7 cm KwK 36
- 4 x MG 34
- 2 x 8mm MG 257 (f)
- 4 x MG 30
- 2 x Mortars
- 2 x 110 cm Kriegsmarine searchlights

== Legend ==
A folk legend that is narrated in Le Petit Bon Homme Andriou in Guernsey is about the Archdruid, the last person in Guernsey to convert to Christianity. Druid was not willing to convert to Christianity when all his fellow people had already done so. He, therefore, decided to retire to a secluded cave in the cliff of Jerbourg Point. From this point, as was his regular habit to watch the sea during severe storm, he saw a ship at a distance approaching, heaving heavily towards the rocks of the peninsula to its utter doom. Druid, frightened by this scene, offered prayers to his pagan gods to save the ship and its passengers. As the gale did not abate and the crash became imminent, he prayed to the Christian God with a vow that if the ship was saved he would convert to Christianity and would build a chapel for the Virgin Mary, the Mother of God. As providence would have it, the storm abated and the disaster of ship wrecking against the Jerbourg Peninsula was averted. A chapel was built where St Martin Primary School now stands.

== Geography ==
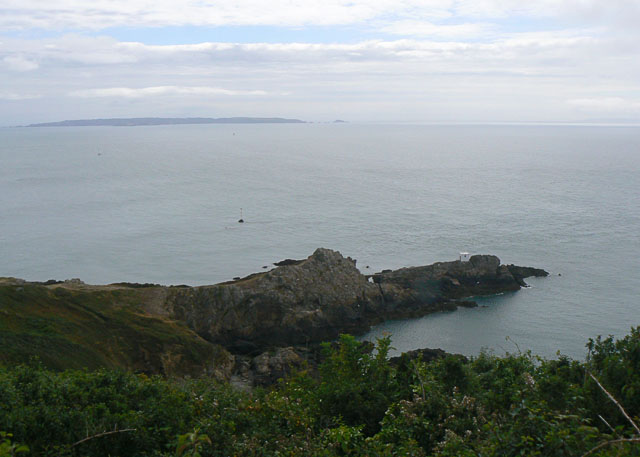
Looking out from the eastern side of the peninsula towards Sark.

The point marks the southeastern coast of the island of Guernsey. At 0.75 miles (1.21 km) in length, it is edged by steep cliffs which are 200 feet (61 m) in height. At the top of the plateau, the surface area can be as much as 300 feet (91 m) above sea level. The width of this landform at its northern and southern ends is a little more than 0.5 miles (0.80 km). However, its midsection is narrowed by the eastern corner of Moulin Huet Bay which is known as Petit Port; here, the promontory's width is only about 1,500 feet (460 m).

The point is approachable by the main road from Sausmarez Manor, leading to La Moye Lane which ends on the cliff tops. Mouilliere Rock, a dangerous rock for navigating ships is located offshore as are Les Grunes de Jerbourg, "very dangerous cluster of rocks a full half mile from the shore". The Encyclopedia of the World's Landforms describes the point as "a jumble of rocky tors and buttresses on a Head-mantled slope undercut by rugged cliffs, descending to the Pea Stacks. Ribs of harder rock run out across the shore, and there is a shingle beach at high tide at Vaux Beres."

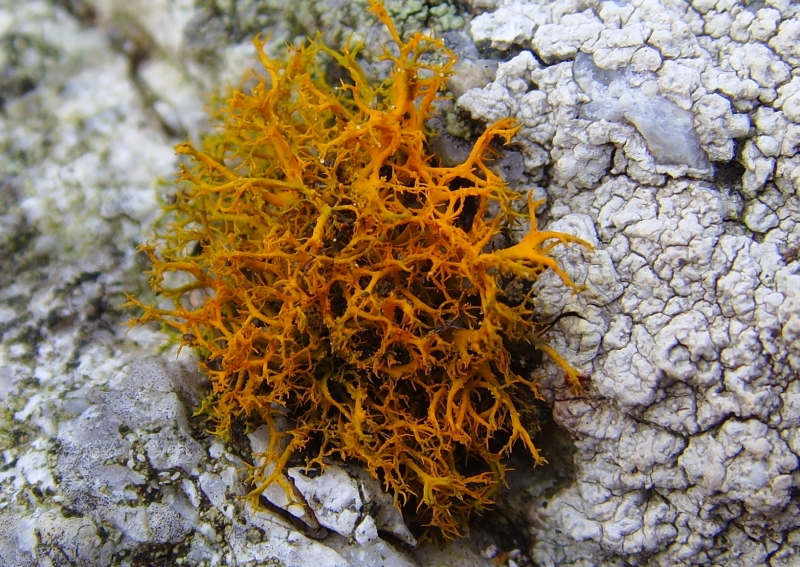
Teloschistes flavicans

Along the coast between Jerbourg Point and Icart Point to the west there are said to be "a number of delightful bays and coves — Petit Port, with its lovely sands which affords good shelter from Easterly, Northerly and North-west winds with 5-9 fathoms of water over clear sand; Moulin Huet, with the Cradle Rock and the Dog and Lion Rocks a short distance offshore". Moulin Huet Bay lies on the western side of the point towards Petit Port. At Moulin Huet Bay, which is slightly to the north of Jerbourg Point, relics of circular walls are seen embedded into rock walls in a precipitous state. A 10-mile footpath traverses the whole length of the south coast between Jerbourg Point and Portelet Harbour in the southwest. On the east coast are the less visited beaches of Marble bay and Divette. Geological formations seen here are of Gneissic rocks, as in the rest of the bay areas near Guernsey. The cliffs of Jerbourg consist of intersected mixed rocks which extend up to the Castle Point. The stratification is irregular with dips tending south.

== Wildlife ==
During the season flowers grow in profusion in the area giving a colourful carpet-like appearance to the terrain. Along the approach path to the Jorgen point many pine trees are also seen. Bridget Ozanne (1953–2007), a botanist, discovered the modern record of lichenized fungi species Teloschistes flavicans at Jerbourg. Jerbourg is an important breeding ground for several species of gulls.

== Protection ==
The following have been listed as Protected Monument:

- The earthworks comprising two banks running east from Petit Port and adjoining medieval platforms at Jerbourg were listed on 26 March 1938, reference PM319.
- The earthworks at St Martin's Point were listed on 26 March 1938, reference PM324.
- The whole of the Battery at Jerbourg was listed on 26 March 1938, reference PM328.
- The whole of La Moye Battery at Jerbourg was listed on 26 March 1938, reference PM327.
