= St Martin's Parish Church, Guernsey =

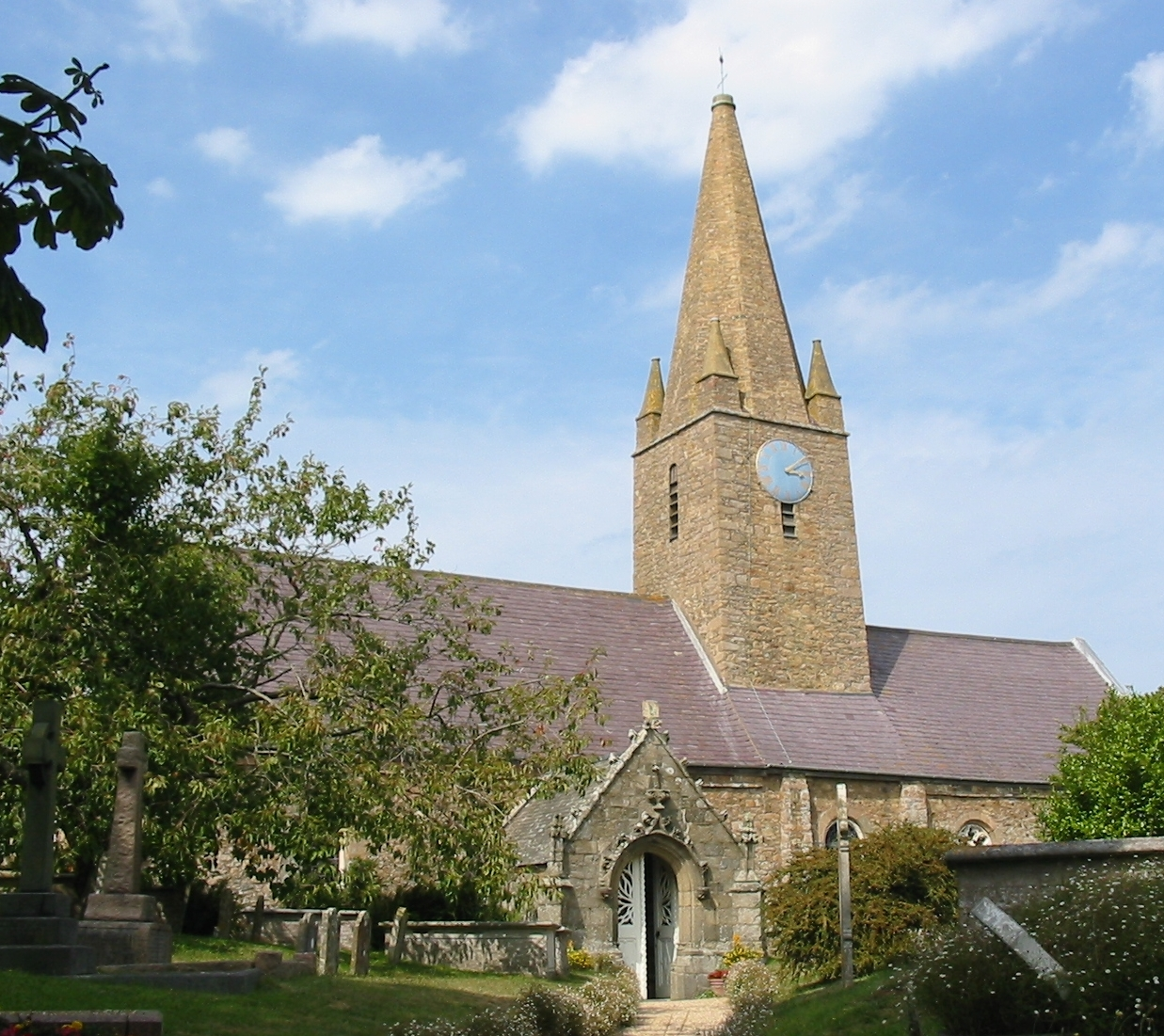
- St Martin's Parish Church, Guernsey

- Location in the Channel Islands
- 49°26′17″N 2°33′16″W
- Country: Channel Islands
- Denomination: Church of England
- Website: www.stmartinschurch.gg

Administration
- Province: Canterbury
- Diocese: Salisbury
- Archdeaconry: Channel Islands
- Deanery: Guernsey
- Benefice: Guernsey
- Parish: St Martin

Clergy
- Rector: Revd. Daniel Foot

St Martin's Parish Church, Guernsey is also known as the Saint Martin de la Bellouse and is located in a dip in an ancient village, in the parish of Saint Martin, Guernsey.

The earliest reference to a religious building on the site was in 1048. The original building was built over, with the oldest parts of the current building dating back to 1225 with a second aisle added in the next century.

La Gran'mère du Chimquière stands at the entrance gate.

The current rector is the Reverend Daniel Foot.

== History ==
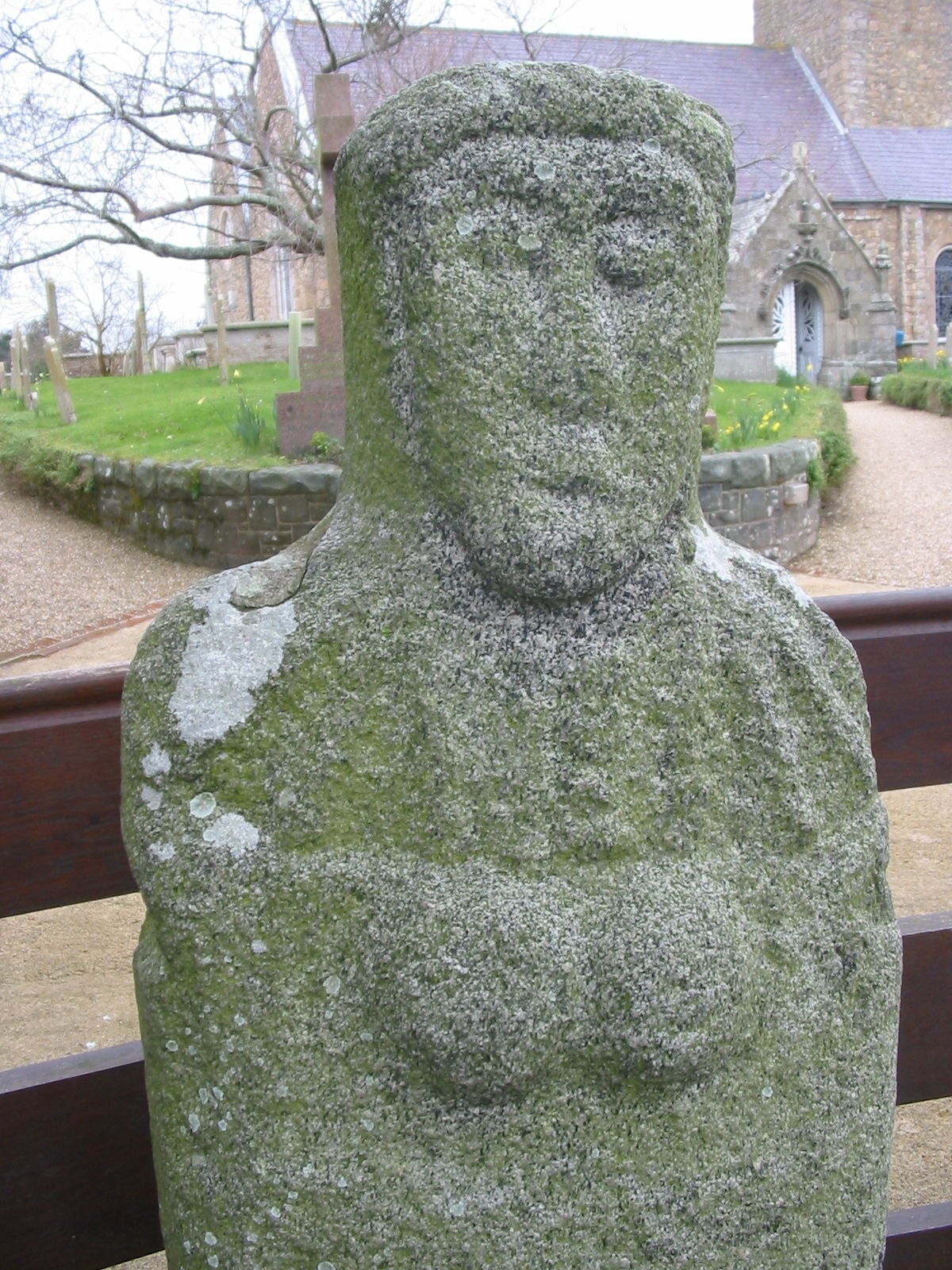
La Gran'mère du Chimquière

There was a Neolithic tomb on the site of the church to which La Gran'mère du Chimquière was possibly linked. This standing stone menhir, dating from 2500 – 1800BC is shaped into a female figure and has had the head recarved, into a more Roman style at a later date. She stands at the main gate and it is traditional for new brides to place flowers on her head for luck.

Close by is a healing spring, la Fontaine de la Bellouse.

Guernsey was Christianised in the sixth century AD.

A wooden church existed on the site in 1048 when William, Duke of Normandy granted St. Martin's as a Parish Church to the Abbot of Marmoutier, near Tours.

The Church was consecrated on 4 February 1199.

The connection with Marmoutier Abbey continued until 1415 when King Henry V confiscated the revenues being sent to France. The Church remained part of the Diocese of Coutances in France until in 1568 when the Channel Islands churches were finally transferred to the Diocese of Winchester.

== Building ==
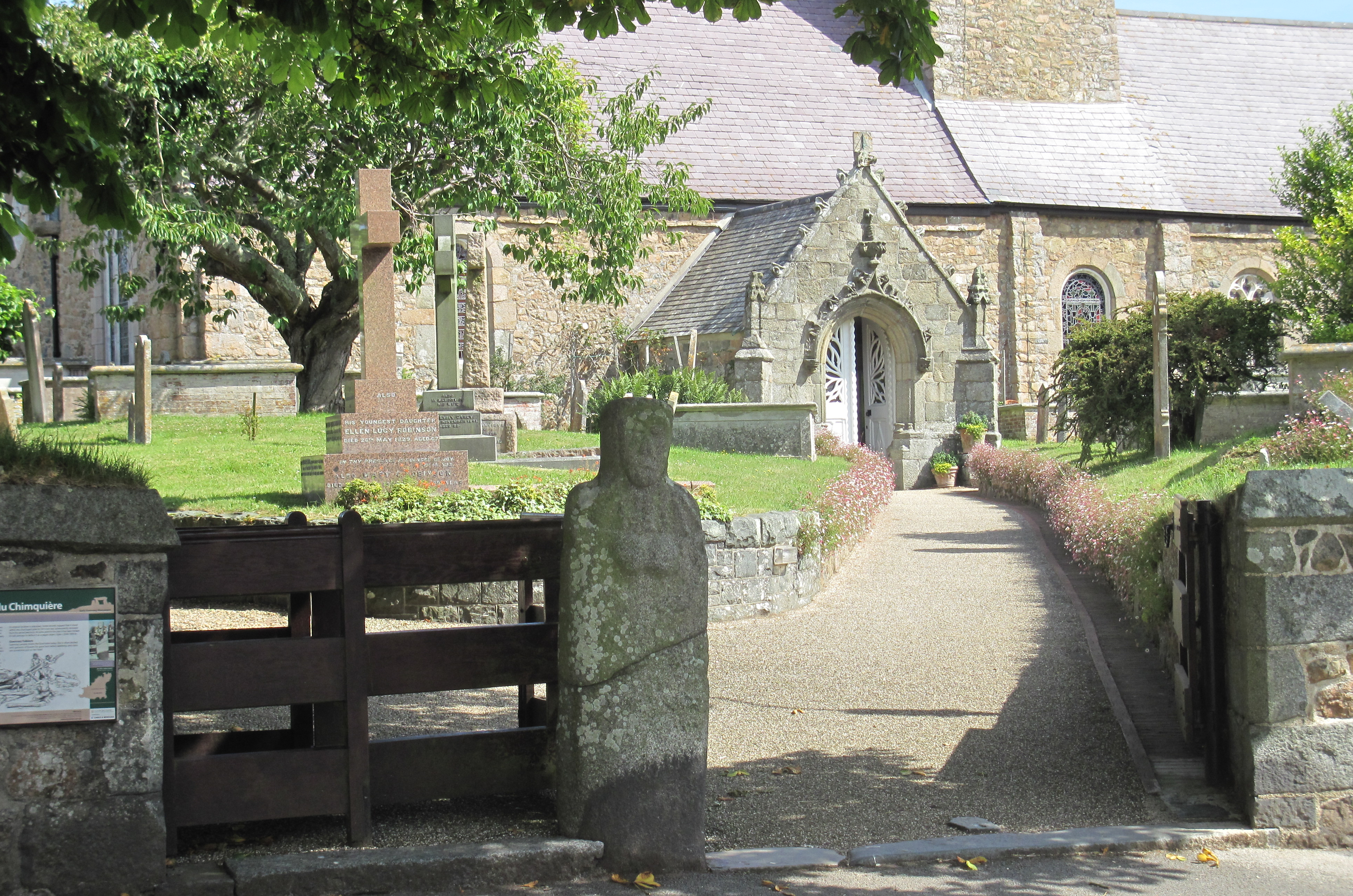
St. Martin's Parish Church entrance

The earliest part, the nave, tower and chancel, date from 1225 to 1250, with the northern aisle being added a century later. The porch was added around 1520 and has a sundial dated 1751.

The font is the oldest in the island, dating from before the reformation. The pulpit dates from 1657 and the organ was installed in 1848.

There are three bells weighing 448, 677 and 947 lbs which were recast by a French bell-founder, Jean Baptiste Brocard at Glategny in Saint Peter Port in September 1736.

The clock was installed by Peter Le Page of St Peter Port in 1869, the bells were linked and the chiming apparatus installed.

== Births, Marriages and Deaths ==
The church records, now held at the Priaulx Library, show baptisms and marriages from 1660 and burials from 1728.

== Media ==
In 2000 the church appeared on a Christmas stamp issued by Guernsey Post.

Artists who have painted the church include John Louis Petit.

== See also ==
- List of churches, chapels and meeting halls in the Channel Islands
