= Man and Boy =

Man and Boy may refer to:

- Man and Boy (1971 film), American film
- Man and Boy (2002 film), British television film
- Man and Boy (novel) by Tony Parsons
- Man and Boy (play) by Terence Rattigan
- Man and Boy (sculpture), public sculpture by Elisabeth Hadley in Brixham, Devon, England
- Man and Boy: Dada, opera by Michael Nyman and Michael Hastings
