= Statue menhir =

Standing stone carved into a human shape

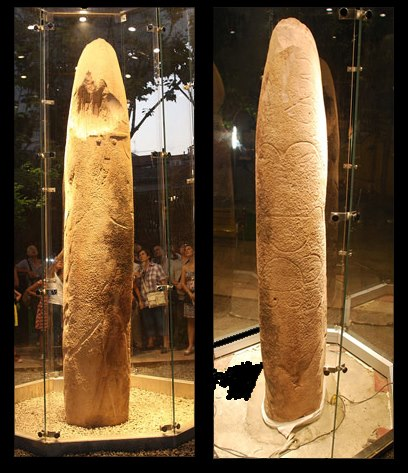
La estatua-menhir del Pla de les Pruneres (Mollet del Vallès). Complutum, 2011, Vol. 22 (1): 71–87. Universidad Complutense de Madrid. Madrid.

A statue menhir is a type of carved standing stone created during the later European Neolithic Period.

The statues consist of a vertical slab or pillar with a stylised design of a human figure cut into it, sometimes with hints of clothing or weapons visible.

== Locations ==
They are most commonly found in Southern France and western France, Catalonia, Corsica, Sardinia, Italy and the Alps. A group from the Iron Age also is known in Liguria and Lunigiana.

There are two in Guernsey, La Gran' Mère du Chimquière ('the Grandmother of the Cemetery'), a highly detailed example in the churchyard of Parish of Saint Martin, and another known simply as La Gran' Mère in the Parish of Castel. The latter is an earlier, less detailed example found buried underneath the porch of the parish church.

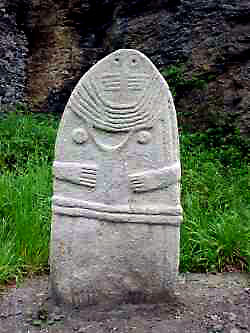
Statue-menhir la Dame de Saint-Sernin, musée Fenaille de Rodez

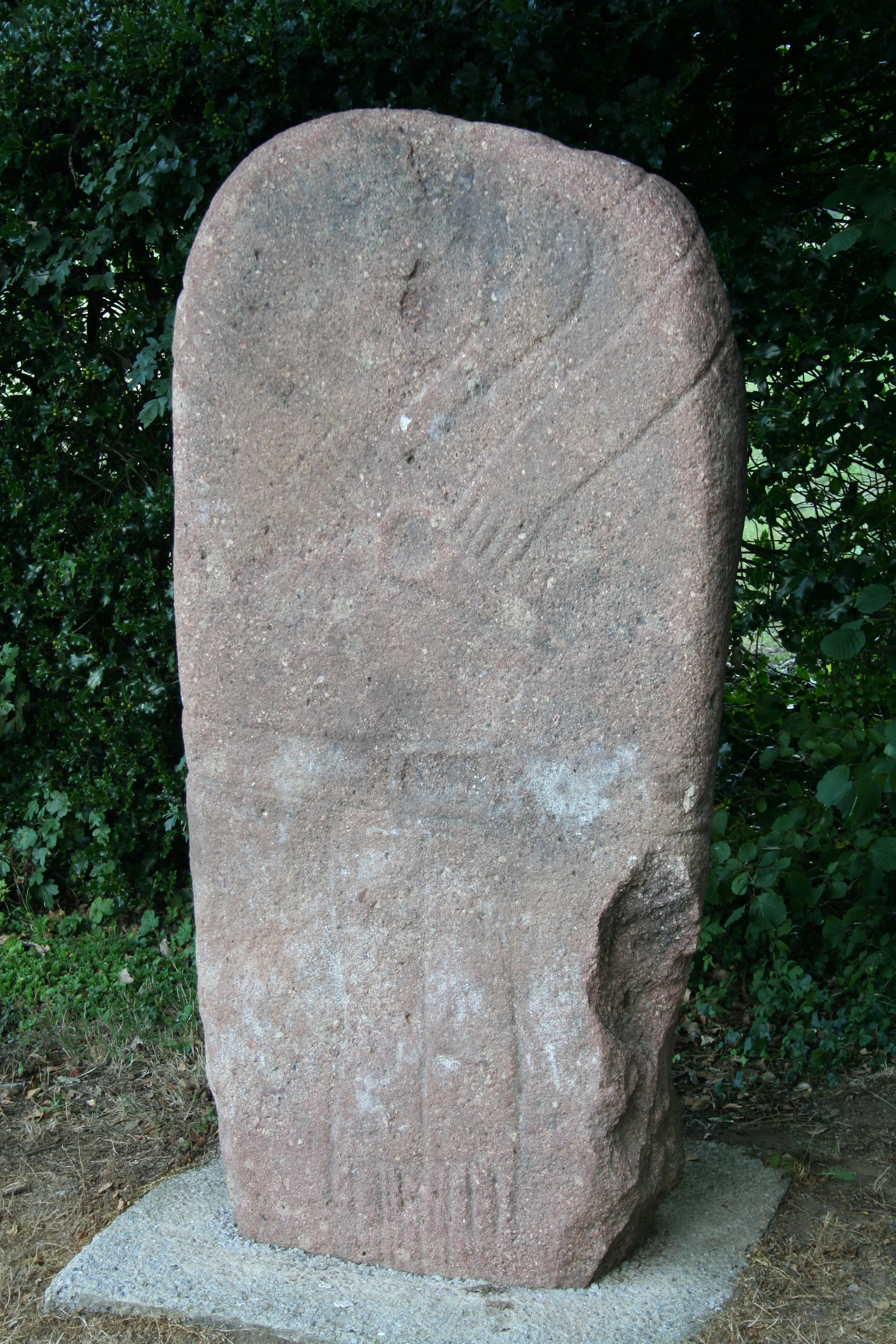
Statue menhir of Paillemalbiau (Murat-sur-Vèbre)

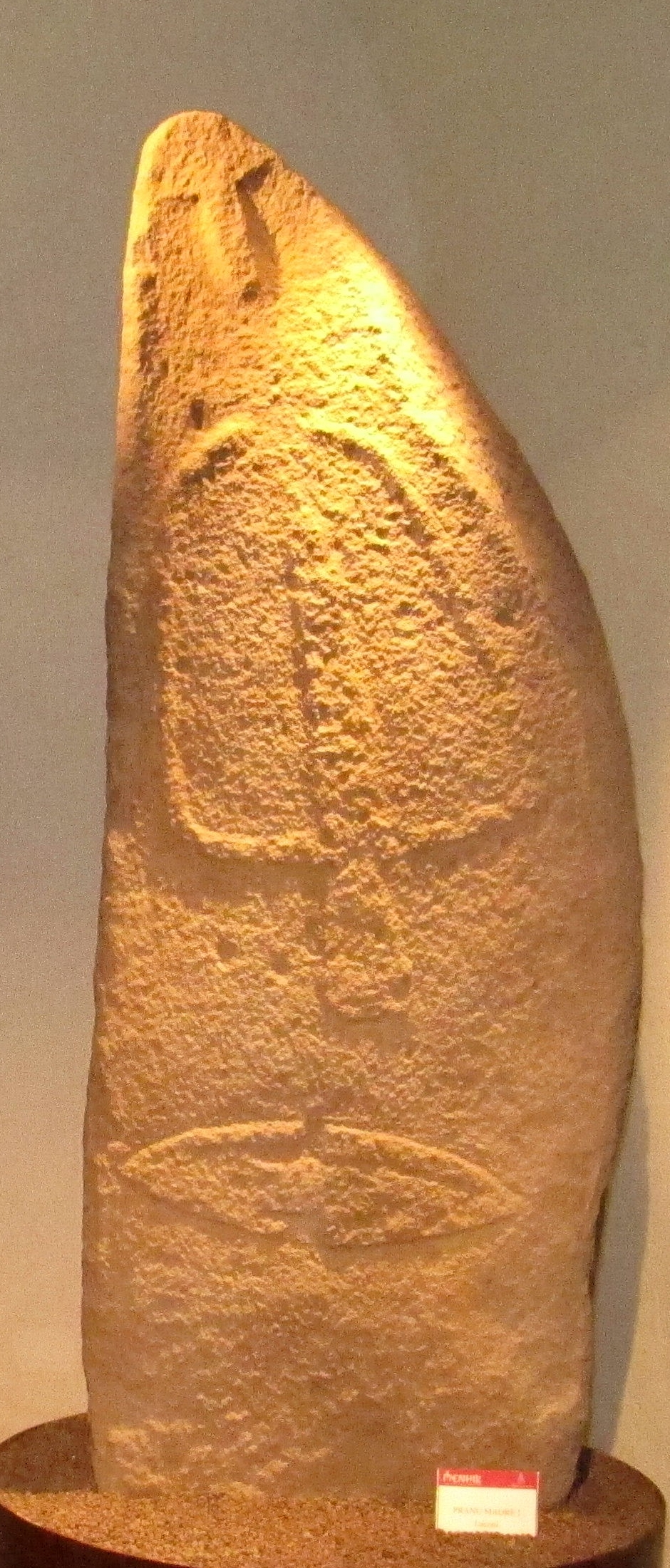
Statue menhir of Laconi, Sardinia

== See also ==
- Kurgan stele
- Megalithic art
