= Icart Point =

Coordinates: 49.42°N 2.56°W

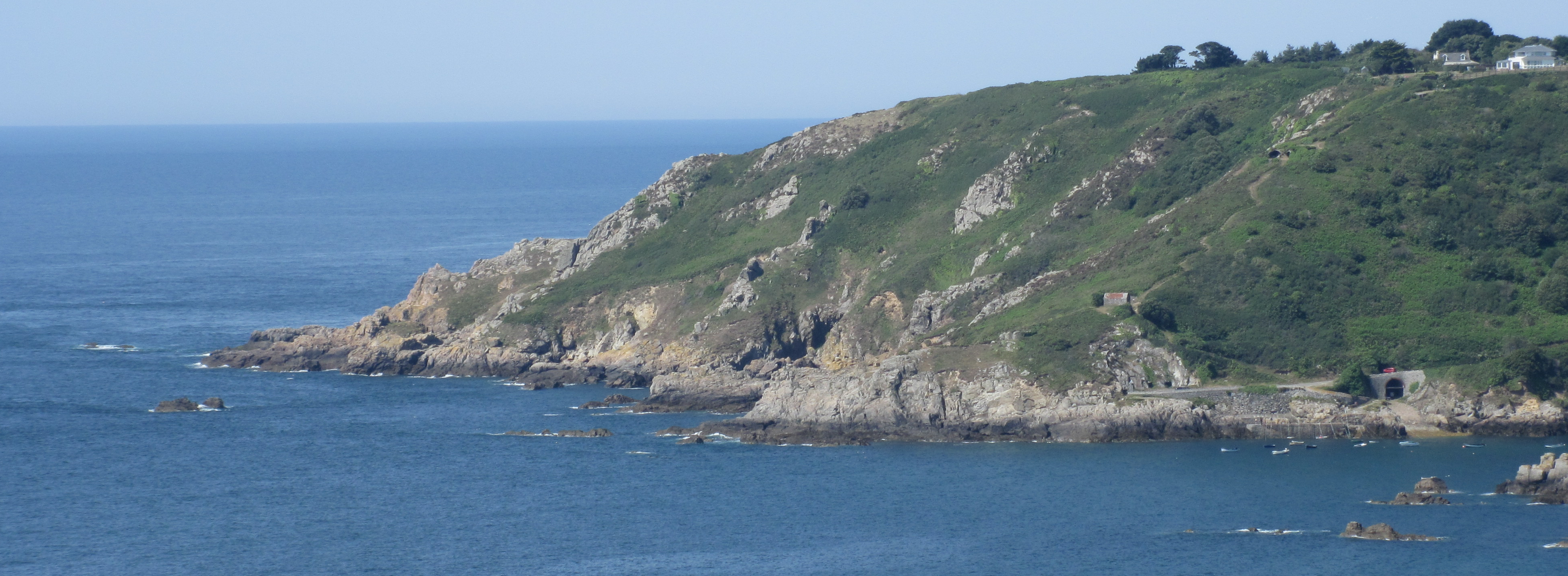
Icart Point

Icart Point is a point of southern Guernsey, located west of Jerbourg Point and east of Petit Port, Moulin Huet and Saint's Bay. It is in the parish of Saint Martin, Guernsey

A German fortification Wildstandnest Ikart was built on the headland during 1942–3. Also on the headland is Saints Bay Hotel. Jaonnet Bay was the site of a British Commando raid during World War II.

There are various walking paths around the point which offer "a rocky, flowery headland and dramatic views". The soil is underlain by Icart Gneiss, an augen gneiss of granitic composition containing potassium feldspar. This was formed from a granite dated at 2,018 million years ago using U-Pb dating on zircon grains.

A race horse has also been named Icart Point.

== Saint's Bay ==
Saint's Bay, directly to the east of Icart Point contains No 14 Guernsey loophole towers, built in the 1780s to help defend the Island. Between 2015 and 2018 the tower was restored by local volunteers. Rubbish was cleaned out and timbers restored or replaced. The firing steps which had been on each floor were recreated. The work was carried out using materials as close to those originally used in the 1780s as possible.

Saint's Bay Right Battery and magazine are protected monuments.

The name "Saint's bay" has an origin going back 1,000 years, Archbishop Mauger, uncle to William the Conqueror. Mauger was deposed from his archbishopric at the council of Lisieux, around 1054. Mauger was banished from Rouen to the Isle of Guernsey. He landed at Saint's bay.

La Marcherie is a house which was demolished in 1944. It was admired by Victor Hugo.

== Icart Bay ==
To the west is La Moye Point, separated from Icart Point by Icart Bay.

== Goat Crags ==
Goat Crags is used for climbing.
