= Todor Todorov (sculptor) =

Bulgarian sculptor (born 1951)

- Born: 26 September 1951 (age 74); Sofia, Bulgaria
- Known for: Sculpture
- Spouse: Daniela Todorova
- Awards: 24 International Awards and Insignia of Honour
- Website: todor.amateras.eu

Todor Todorov is a Bulgarian sculptor. He was born in Sofia in a family of visual artists.

== Works ==
His kinetic sculpture "Dance" was one of the 19 directly invited/awarded sculptures placed permanently in the Olympic Buildings for the 2008 Summer Olympics in Beijing. Other kinetic sculptures by Todor Todorov can be seen at Artparks Sculpture Park, Guernsey UK, Sculpture by the Sea, Sydney, Venice Sculpture Park, designed by Carlo Scarpa etc. In 2004 and 2005 he won First Prize awards for Kinetic Sculpture in the Kinetic Art Organization's International Kinetic Art Competition, in Palm Beach, Florida, USA. One of his bronze sculpture "Totem" has been placed at the New Town Square of Hamilton, Scotland for the Millennium celebration.

== Published books ==
"Elemental Sculpture" was published by Cambridge Scholars Publishing in 2013 in English and by Altera Publishing House in Bulgarian. The doctorate is a study in the field of contemporary sculpture, describing an existing but unexplored trend in the development of relationships between sculpture and natural elements, called by the author Elemental Sculpture.
