= Peter Newsome =

British artist

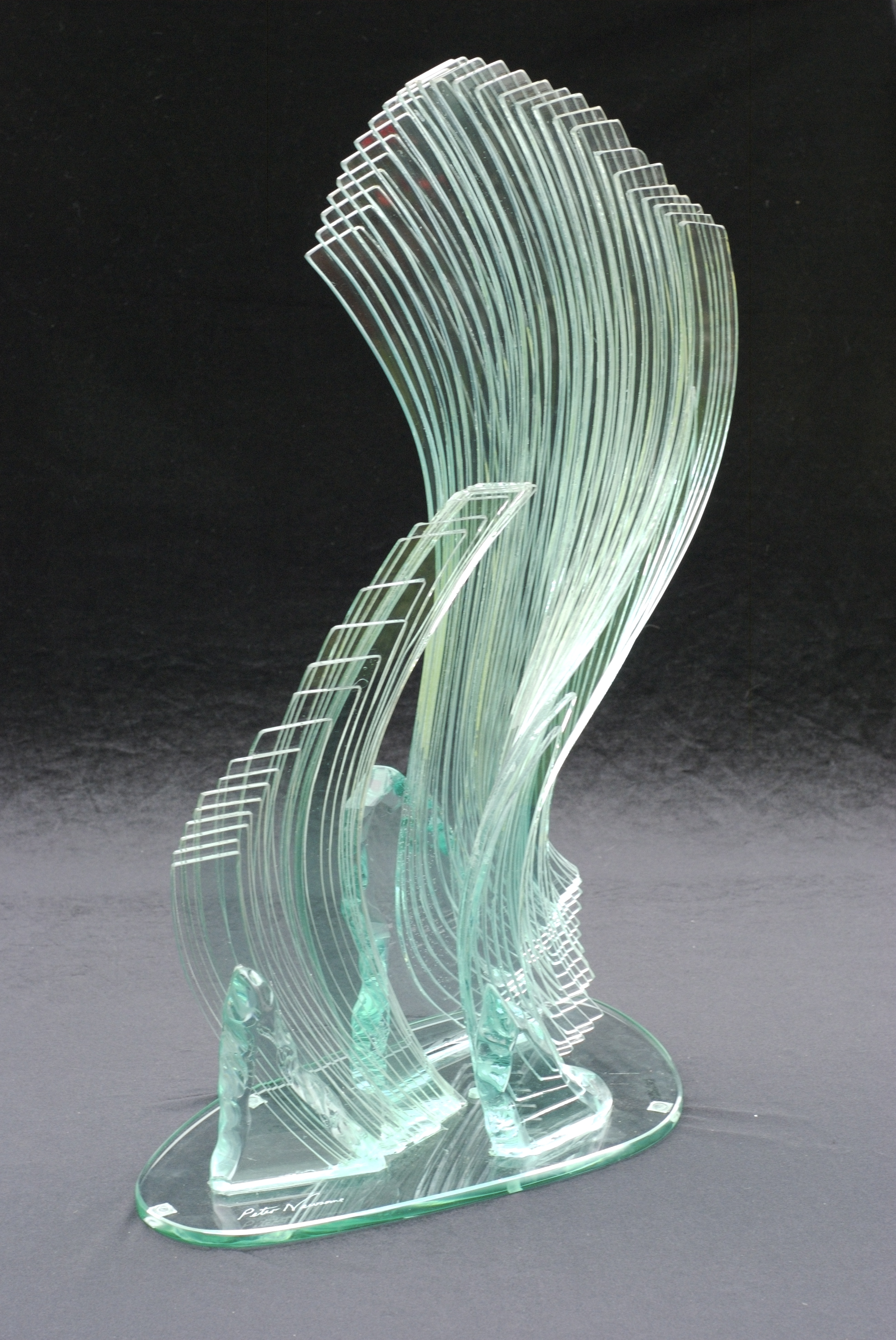
Wind Song Glass

Peter Newsome (born February 1943 in London, UK) is a modern-day glass sculptor. He is a member of the Royal Society of Sculptors.

== Selected exhibitions ==
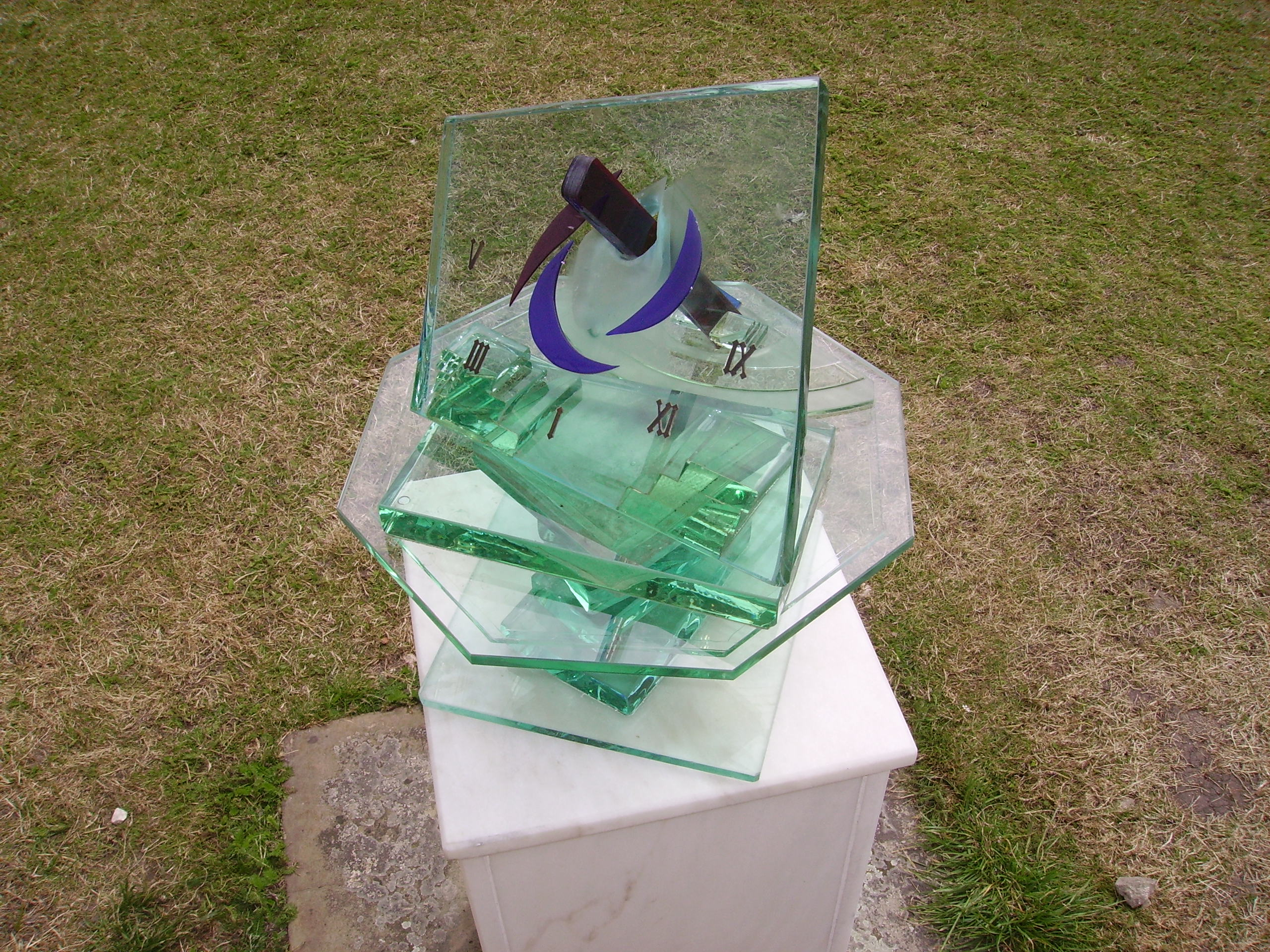
Sundial Glass

- Art Fair London, Burton's Court, Chelsea & Business Design Centre, Islington.
- Bow House Gallery, Barnet, Herts.
- Centenary Exhibition of Royal British Society of Sculptors, Botanical Gdns, Leicester
- Chelsea Flower Show, London
- Chelsea Open, Chelsea Old Town Hall, London
- Cynthia Corbett Gallery, Wimbledon, Surrey
- Dignon Gallery, Dundas St, Edinburgh
- Dfn Gallery, Broadway, Manhattan, New York, USA
- Edith Grove Gallery, Fulham London
- ERCO Dover St. London, W1
- Goldsmiths Fair, Goldsmiths Hall, London
- Guernsey International Sculpture Exhibition, Channel Islands
- Hay's Gallery, London SE1
- Hampton Court Flower Show, Hampton Court, Middx
- Henley Festival, Towpath Gallery, Henley on Thames, Oxon.
- Mall Galleries, The Mall, London.
- Newby Hall Sculpture Park, Yorkshire.
- Nymans Garden (National Trust) Sussex
- OXO Tower, South Bank, London
- Royal Horticultural Garden Wisley, Surrey
- Royal British Society of Sculptors, Kensington, London
