= Doyle Monument =

Monument in Jerbourg Point

Coordinates: 49.4269°N 2.5342°W

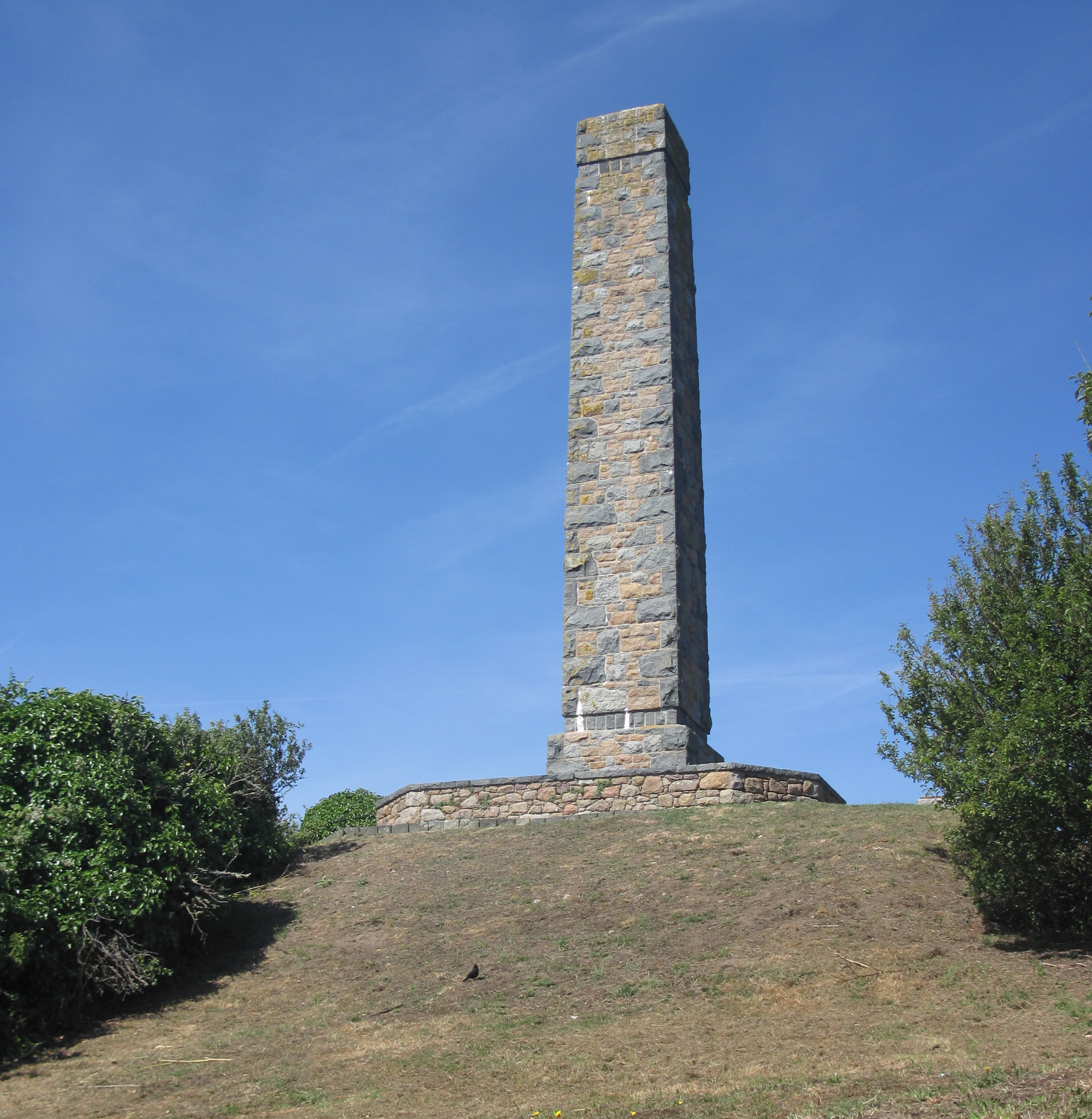
The Doyle Monument

The Doyle Monument is located in Jerbourg Point in the southeastern point of the Bailiwick of Guernsey within St Martin Parish. It was built to honour Sir John Doyle (1756-1834), Lieutenant Governor of Guernsey 1803-1816, by the people of the island.

== Monuments ==
=== Original ===
The original monument, built in 1820, was 96 feet (29 m) in height. It was built of granite and a staircase inside wound up to its summit. It had the simple inscription, "Doyle - Gratitude".

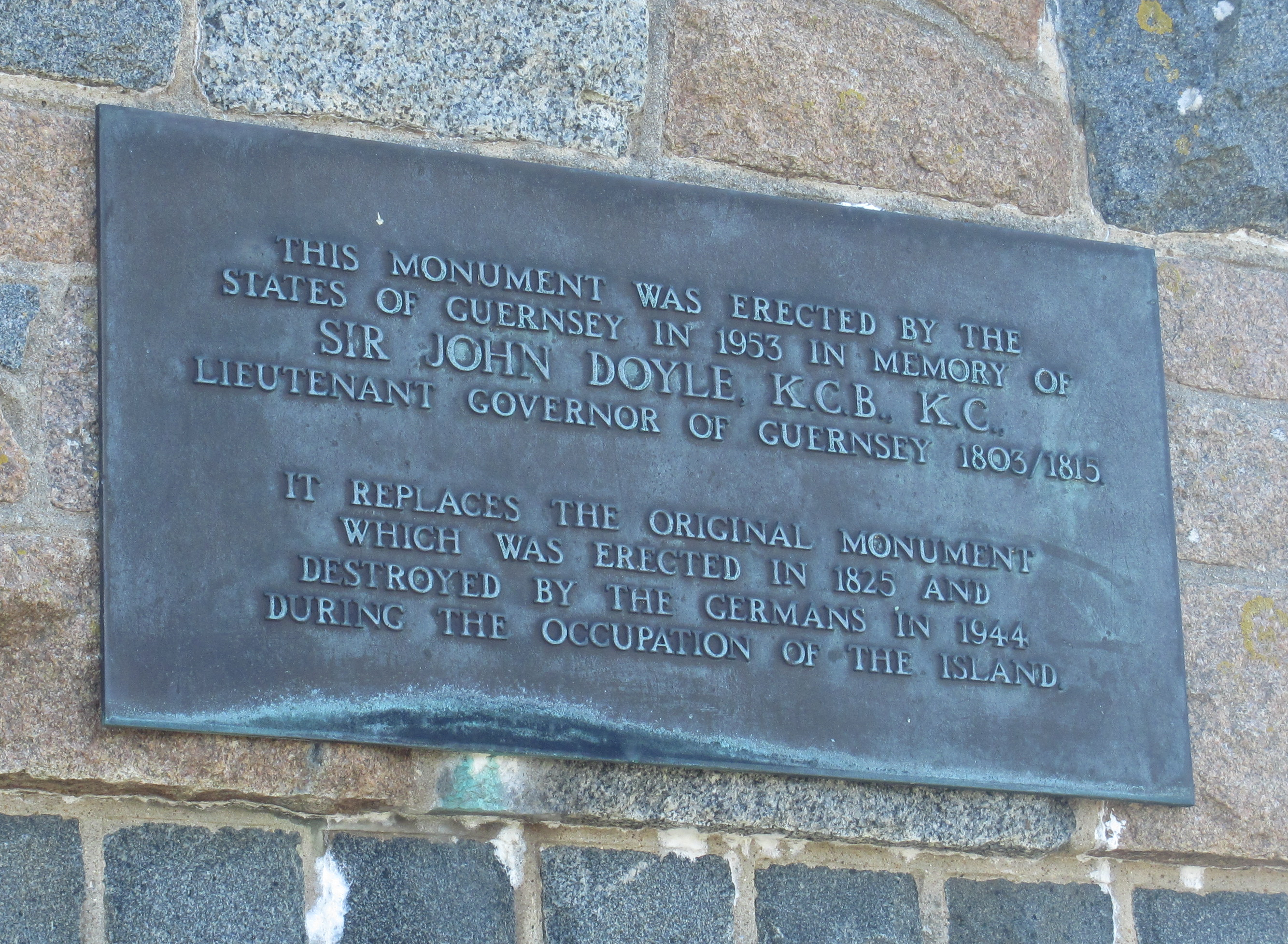
1953 Plaque

A coloured engraving of the monument appears in the book Festung Guernsey which was created by the German occupiers to document their defences of the island. The monument was demolished by German engineers in 1944 during the Occupation as Batterie Strassburg was built close to the site and it blocked the 360-degree angle of fire, photographs showing the demolition were taken.

=== Replacement ===
A second smaller monument, a granite column, was built in the same location, a small hill, at a cost of £1,400, and was completed in 1953.
