= Sausmarez Manor =

Historic house in Saint Martin, Guernsey

Coordinates: 49°26′08″N 02°32′50″W

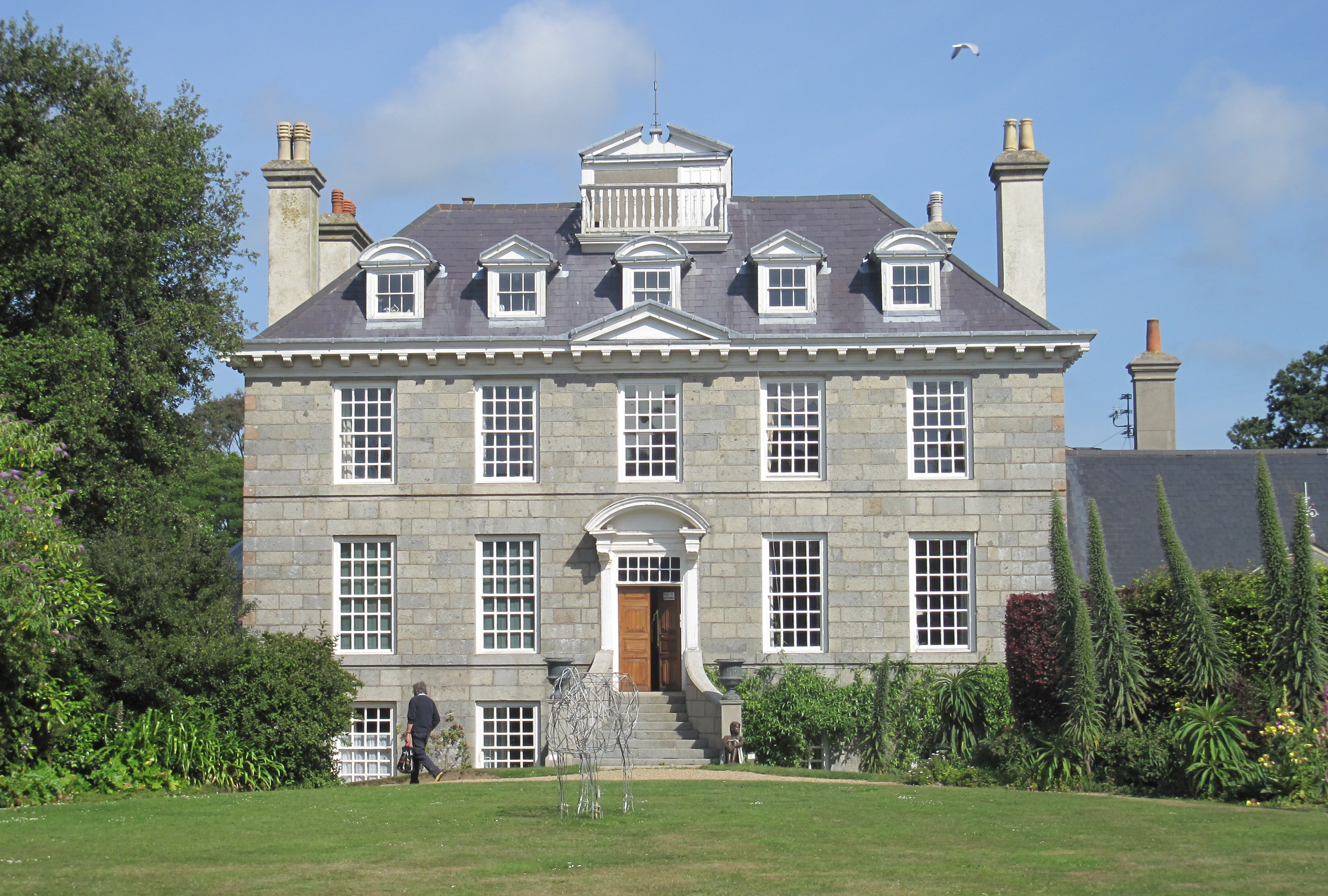
Sausmarez Manor, 2011

Sausmarez Manor is a historic house in Saint Martin, Guernsey.

== The original manor house ==
The first mention of the Sausmarez family in Guernsey is at the consecration of the Vale church in 1117 attended by Guillaume de Sausmarez, followed by a letter dated 1254 in which Prince Edward, Lord of the Isles, afterwards King Edward I, ordered an enquiry into the rights of the Abbot and Monks of Mont-Saint-Michel to "wreck" in the Islands of Guernsey and Jersey. The enquiry was duly held before "Dominus Henry le Canelu, Dominus Gulielmus De Saumareis, milites". The William de Saumareis is almost certainly the same person as William de Salinells who was Seigneur de Samarès, then called Saumareys, in the parish of Saint Clement in Jersey, who was born towards the end of the reign of Richard Coeur de Lion. It is not known when he acquired his new fief in St Martin's parish in Guernsey, but its manor-house was on much the same site as the present one.

In 1313 an inquisition of Edward II and again in 1331 Matthew de Sausmarez was Captain of the Castle at Jerbourg and the Seigneur of the Manor. The fief was mentioned in the Extente (land value assessment) of 1331 in the reign of Edward III of England as having belonged "from time immemorial" to the family of his grandson Matthew. The capture of the Island by the French in 1338 resulted in 1341, after a battle was lost in Les Hubits, St Martin, to Sir Peter de Sausmarez escaping via Petit Port to Jersey, returning after the Island was retaken in 1345.

Of this oldest manor-house only a fragment remains. Its rough but remarkably solid stonework forms the basis of an outhouse on the north-east side of the main buildings and surrounds an arched doorway which was later blocked in with a different form of stone. This is one of the most ancient fragments of unrepaired Norman masonry in the island and can be fairly confidently dated to the mid 13th century.

== The Tudor house ==
Both manor and fief remained in the possession of the family until 1557. In that year the Seigneur, George de Sausmarez, died without issue and left his estate to his sister Judith; sixteen years previously she had married an Englishman called John Andrews. who had come to Guernsey from Northamptonshire as Lieutenant to Sir Peter Mewtis, the Governor of the Islands. Their son John, who became known in Guernsey as John Andros, was in 1557, in accordance with Guernsey law, declared Seigneur in his mother's right. His rights to the title and manor being confirmed by a Royal Commission that reported in 1607. It was he who built the second house, running down the slope of the shallow valley towards the fish pond, at right angles to the original one. In a party-wall on the ground floor of this building there is carved, on a lintel over a door leading from the main-hall to a smaller room, the initials I.A. and the date 1585. The lower end of the house is now used as a craft metal workshop, and the upper, which was restored and altered, once in 1759 and again exactly two hundred years later, is still inhabited.

== The Queen Anne house ==
Including John Andros, six members of his family were Seigneurs of Sausmarez over a period of nearly two hundred years. The third of these, Amyas Andros, who was a staunch royalist throughout the Civil War, played a distinguished part as liaison between the King's forces which controlled Jersey and the brave royalist garrison of Castle Cornet. After the Restoration, he was made Bailiff by Charles II, being one of the only two prominent Guernseymen who were not obliged to seek pardon from their Sovereign for their conduct during the Grand Rebellion. His son, Sir Edmund Andros, was in 1674 both Bailiff and Lieutenant Governor of Guernsey and at the same time Governor of the Colony of New York as well as New England, North Carolina, Virginia, Massachusetts, New Plymouth and New Jersey. In fact it was he, who changed the name from New Amsterdam to New York, when he was its first British Governor. Very little of his time seems to have been spent in Guernsey, for he retired to live in Westminster. One of his reasons for doing so appears from the following clause in his will, dated 1713.

My will is that my said nephew, John, shall build within five years of my death a good suitable house on or at the manor of Sasmares in Guernsey and if the said John or his heirs shall not in that time have built such house (if not built before) then my will is and I appoint my said nephew John or his heirs to pay the sum of £500 unto my nephew George Andros within one year after his or their neglect.

—

Clearly Sir Edmund did not consider the old Tudor Manor House to be worthy of a man of his station. Moreover, he contemplated rebuilding it himself. The great beauty of the building and the strong touches of New England influence that it displays indicate that the plans were prepared for him in London before his death in 1714. The work was duly carried out by John Andros during the next four years, though the clause quoted suggests that he did so with some reluctance and under the threat of sanctions!

The façade, built of grey granite with red granite coigns is of beautiful proportions. The house, all the outer walls of which are two feet thick in thickness, is four storeys high and has two rooms on each floor. It originally had no communication with any of the earlier buildings. The main entrance is from a flight of eight steps leading to the oaken front door on the first floor. This door opens upon a hall whence a typical Queen Anne staircase rises to the top of the house, and ends with a door giving access to a widows walk, from which can be had a fine view of the greater part of the Island.

The next Seigneur, Charles Andros, succeeded his uncle John in 1746. Within two years he had sold the house and fief back to the de Sausmarez family to whose history we must now return.

Having lost their connection with the manor house and fief as a result of their cousin Judith's marriage to John Andros, some members of the younger branch of the de Sausmarez family became, like so many of the fellow islanders in the 16th and 17th centuries, wool merchants with their chief markets in France. In the days of Charles II a Michel de Sausmarez (b.1655) had a shop in Paris where he sold woollen goods, principally stockings, provided for him by a cousin from an efficiently organised Guernsey cottage industry. Among his customers was Prince Rupert of the Rhine who ordered some of his clothes from the French Capital.

Yet despite this high patronage the wool trade was by then in decline as a consequence of a change in fashion greatly stimulated by the French King, Louis XIV, who made his nobles dress in silk and satin in order to attend his court at Versailles.

The firm faced ruin, but Michel's eldest son Matthew (b.1685), from whom all members of the family today are descended, was a man of imagination and energy. He married Anne Durell, the daughter of a rich Jersey Jurat and niece of Sir Edward de Carteret, retired Governor of New Jersey, and with the money she brought him fitted out some of the earliest of those Guernsey privateers on the activities of which, legal or otherwise, the wealth of the island was in the 18th century so largely to rely. It is not unreasonable to suppose that Matthew, on some visit to France, noticed how profitable the corsairs were proving to the citizens of the port of St. Malo and decided to take a leaf out of his neighbours' book. In addition to being a pioneer of privateering he was also in practice in Guernsey as an advocate.

His eldest son, John, was, like him, a member of the Guernsey bar and for 38 years held succession the two Law Offices of the Crown, those of Controller and Procurer. His second son, Philip, was the first of many of the family to serve in the Royal Navy. The latter, after a most promising career, in the course of which he sailed round the world with Commodore George Anson in HMS Centurion, was put in command of the great Spanish galleon, the richest prize ever, captured during his voyage. He was killed in action and left a considerable fortune, derived from prize money, to his family. This windfall certainly helped John to buy back the fief and Manor House from Charles Andros in 1748. A third son, Matthew, was the father of Admiral James Saumarez, 1st Baron de Saumarez.

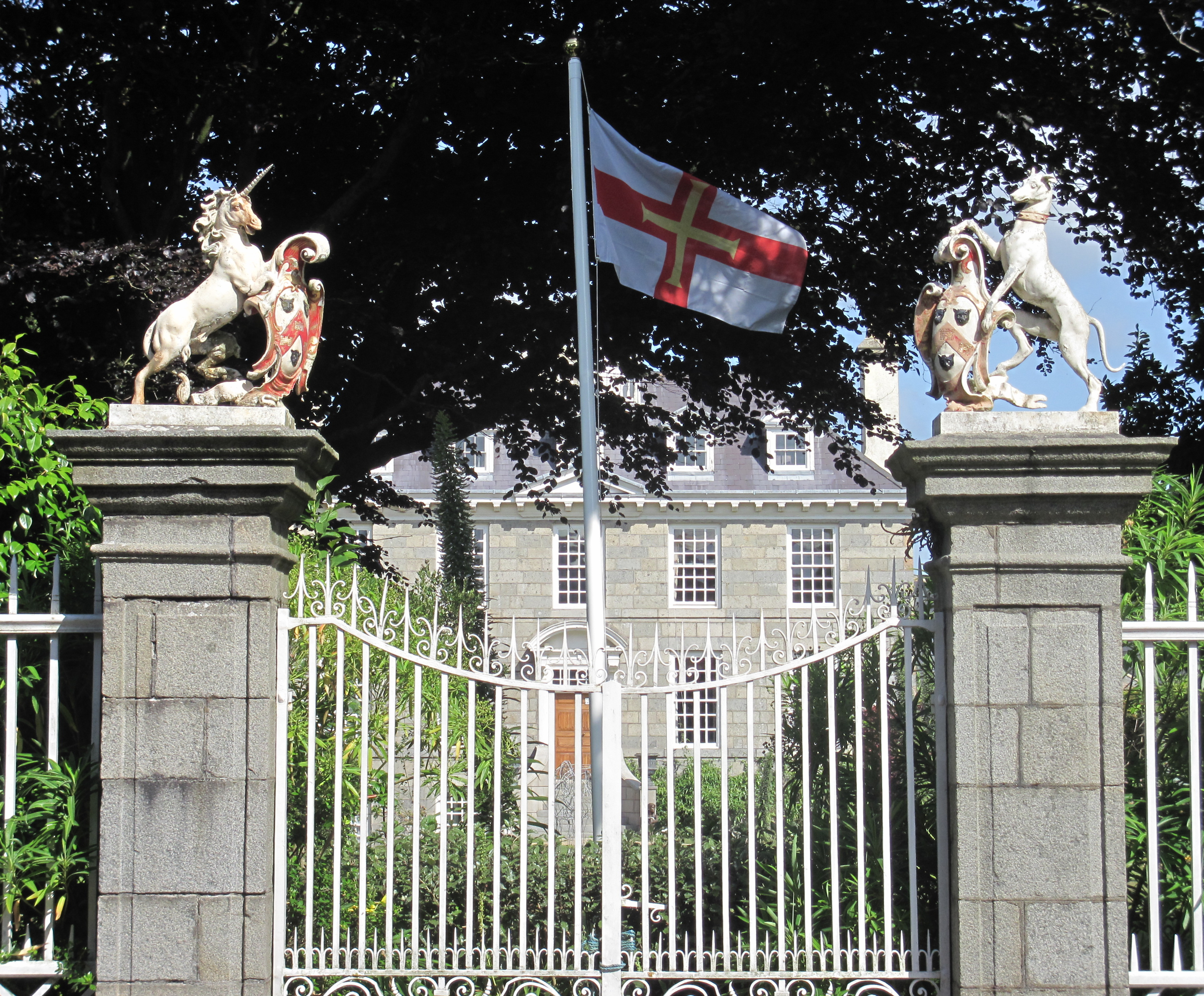
The gates of the Manor with their heraldic devices

Having regained the house of his ancestors, John de Sausmarez celebrated his return by putting up the gates, which are a well known feature of Sausmarez Road. Their outer pillars each bear the family crest of a falcon displayed, the two inner ones a unicorn and a greyhound, the supporters of the family arms. These were all the work of Sir Henry Cheere, the celebrated 18th-century sculptor who also made the memorial to Philip Saumarez in Westminster Abbey. In 1759, John restored the upper end of the Tudor manor house and added a new entrance to it.

== The Regency house ==
John's heir, his eldest son Matthew, was Seigneur from 1774 to 1820. His main contribution to the estate was the building of the walls which enclose the potager, (vegetable garden) the orchard and the tennis court and the restoration of the old barn facing the Tudor house and to the south-west of it. When he died he was succeeded by his brother Thomas who, like his father, was both Controller and Procureur, though for an even longer period of fifty-five years.

Thomas had been a fiery youth who, in 1790, had fought a successful duel against his cousin Robert le Marchant, a son of the bailiff of that day, the repercussions of which provoked considerable discussion in fashionable London circles. Thomas eventually settled down to have an enormous family. His two marriages brought him twenty-eight children. Though some of these died in infancy, he still had many who were not yet of age when he moved into the Manor. He therefore found the Andros house too small for his needs, and was obliged to build on to the back of it. His plans for it show it to have been a pleasant addition. It had a large breakfast room on the first floor and several bedrooms on this and the two upper floors. A central passage separated it on each floor from the Queen Anne house. On the ground floor, what is now part of a kitchen was originally used as the Procureur's office.

Little (it is impossible to say how much) of this Regency house, which began in the last year of George III's reign, remains. Some of the doors and one of the bedroom windows are still clearly identifiable as is part of the roof. But the greater portion of it was pulled down by Thomas's youngest son, General George de Sausmarez who, having bought his brothers' shares of the property, became Seigneur and in 1873 began building the last and final additions to the family home with typical mid-Victorian gusto, employing a Parisian garden designer who had ambitious plans which would not be fulfilled.

== The Victorian house ==
The General had had a distinguished career in the service of the East India Company. An expert in small-arms training and a reformer in military administration he never saw a shot fired in war. In the Indian mutiny his, the Madras, command was the only one which had no mutineers. Yet though he won no great glory like Havelock and Colin Campbell, his was a lucrative post which enabled him on his return to Guernsey to indulge to the full his somewhat liberal and not always irreproachable taste.

Having pulled down most of his father's Regency house, he replaced it on the first floor with a large dining-room and still larger drawing-room. Despite the unfortunate appearance which their windows and general design present from outside, in strong contrast to the Queen Anne facade, the interiors of these rooms have a peculiar charm. The same startling mixture of happy and unhappy touches of inspiration characterise the large entrance-hall which the General built on the north-east side of the Queen Anne house to link it with the Tudor one. The main feature of this hall and gallery is a riotous medley of wood-carving, some of it Burmese, some of it copies of the same by a local craftsman and some of it consisting of Old Testament figures and scenes, believed to have been acquired from Breton churches where they had been put up for sale. The whole presents an effect which, one feels, would meet with the approval of John Betjeman with his sympathetic eye for such Victorian fantasy.

After the General's death his widow lived on at the Manor, as Dame, with her sister and brother until her death in 1915. She was succeeded in the Seigneurie by her nephew, Sir Havilland de Sausmarez who, after a distinguished judicial career in the service of the Foreign Office, including serving as Chief Judge of the British Supreme Court for China for 16 years became the second member of his family to hold the office of Bailiff of Guernsey. He died during the German occupation of the Island. His persistent refusal to install electric light saved the manor from being requisitioned by the occupying power. His nephew, the late Seigneur, Cecil de Sausmarez (1907-1986), after a distinguished career in the Diplomatic Service and whilst a successful people deputy carried out an extensive programme of restoration and modernisation of the property.

== See also ==
- Artparks Sculpture Park

== Notes ==
=== Bibliography ===
- Sausmarez, Peter de, Sausmarez Manor (tour guide booklet), Guernsey, Channel Islands.
