= Martín Icart =

Uruguayan footballer (born 1984)

Personal information
- Full name: Héctor Martín Icart Atahídes
- Date of birth: 1 December 1984 (age 41)
- Place of birth: Montevideo, Uruguay
- Height: 1.74 m (5 ft 9 in)
- Position: Midfielder

Senior career*
Years	Team	Apps	(Gls)
2002–2008	Bella Vista	133	(13)
2009	Danubio	11	(0)
2009–2010	Rampla Juniors	20	(1)
2010	Defensor Sporting	2	(0)
2011	Cerro	10	(1)
2011–2012	River Plate Montevideo	14	(1)
2013	Juventud	14	(5)
2013–2014	Cienciano	53	(9)
2015	La Equidad	14	(0)
2015–2016	Patriotas Boyacá	13	(1)
2016	UTC	2	(0)
2017	Central Español	12	(1)
2017–2018	Deportes Puerto Montt	11	(1)
2018–2019	Sud América	24	(3)
- * Club domestic league appearances and goals

Héctor Martín Icart Atahídes (born 1 December 1984 in Montevideo) is a retired Uruguayan footballer.
