= Tolleck Winner =

UK-based sculptor (born 1959)

Tolleck Winner is a United Kingdom-based sculptor. Born 30 July 1959 in the former Soviet Union, he has lived and worked in the United Kingdom since 1980.

He works in a variety of media and is an Associate member of the Royal British Society of Sculptors. He is a member of the Royal Over Seas League, Design and Artists Copyright Society, New Generation Art Movement and Association of Independent Museums.

On 14 November 2008, he was a contestant on the UK TV gameshow Deal or No Deal where he made history by becoming the contestant who sold the £250,000 box for £9,000, the lowest amount for which the £250,000 had been sold at the time. It has now been sold for £8,000.

== Exhibitions ==
Group Exhibitions in London, UK (selection): Albemarle Gallery, 2015/ Albemarle Gallery, 2014 / Gallery Different, 2011 / The RBA Annual Open Exhibition at the Mall Galleries,2011 / Henley Festival, 2010/ Russian Art Fair, 2010 / Novas Gallery, 2009 / DAC'S Group Show, 2007 / Alon Zakaim Gallery, 2007 / Alon Zakaim Gallery, 2006 / Brunei Gallery, 2005 / ICI Corporation Manchester, 2004 / The Art Engine Gallery, 2004. Solo Exhibitions in London, UK (selection): Diorama Gallery Osnaburgh, 2003 / Charity Fair, Business Design Centre, 2003 / Frech Art, Business Design Centre, 2003 / Alon Zakaim Fine Art Gallery, 2007
