= La Gran' Mère de Chimquiere =

Statue in Guernsey, Channel Islands

Coordinates: 49.43793137°N 2.55465924°W

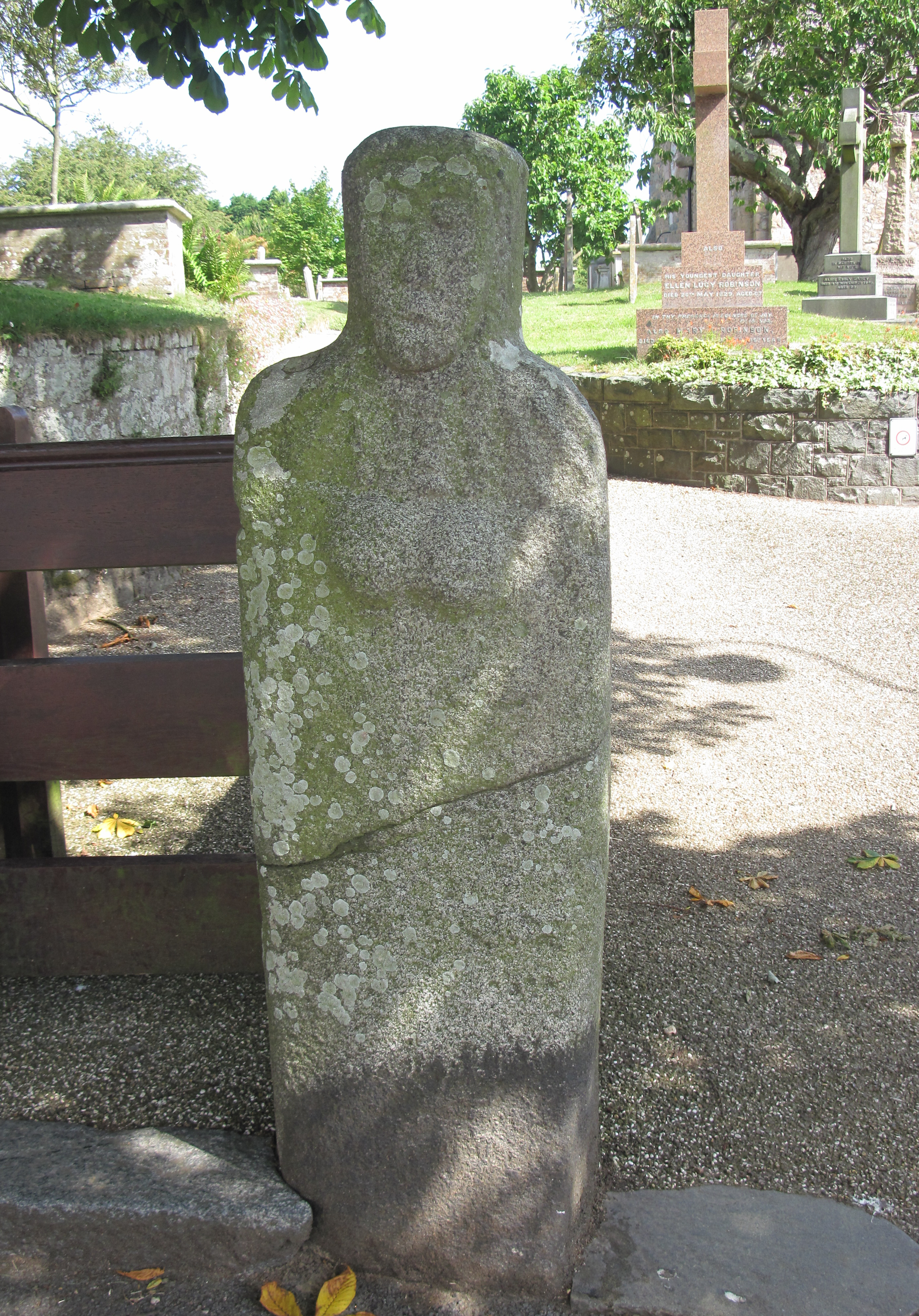
- Material: Stone
- Height: 1.65 meters
- Created: c. 2150 BC
- Present location: Guernsey

The La Gran' Mère de Chimquiere (English: The Grandmother of the Cemetery) is a statue menhir that is located near the parish church of St Martin on Guernsey in the Channel Islands.

The statue is a female figure that stands 1.65 meters in height. Originally it was a Neolithic statue carved around 2500-1800 BC. The statue was reworked around the Roman period to add a cape and head dress or hair. The statue was split in the 19th century; local legend attributes the break to a church warden who was against the pagan statue.
