= Man and Boy (sculpture) =

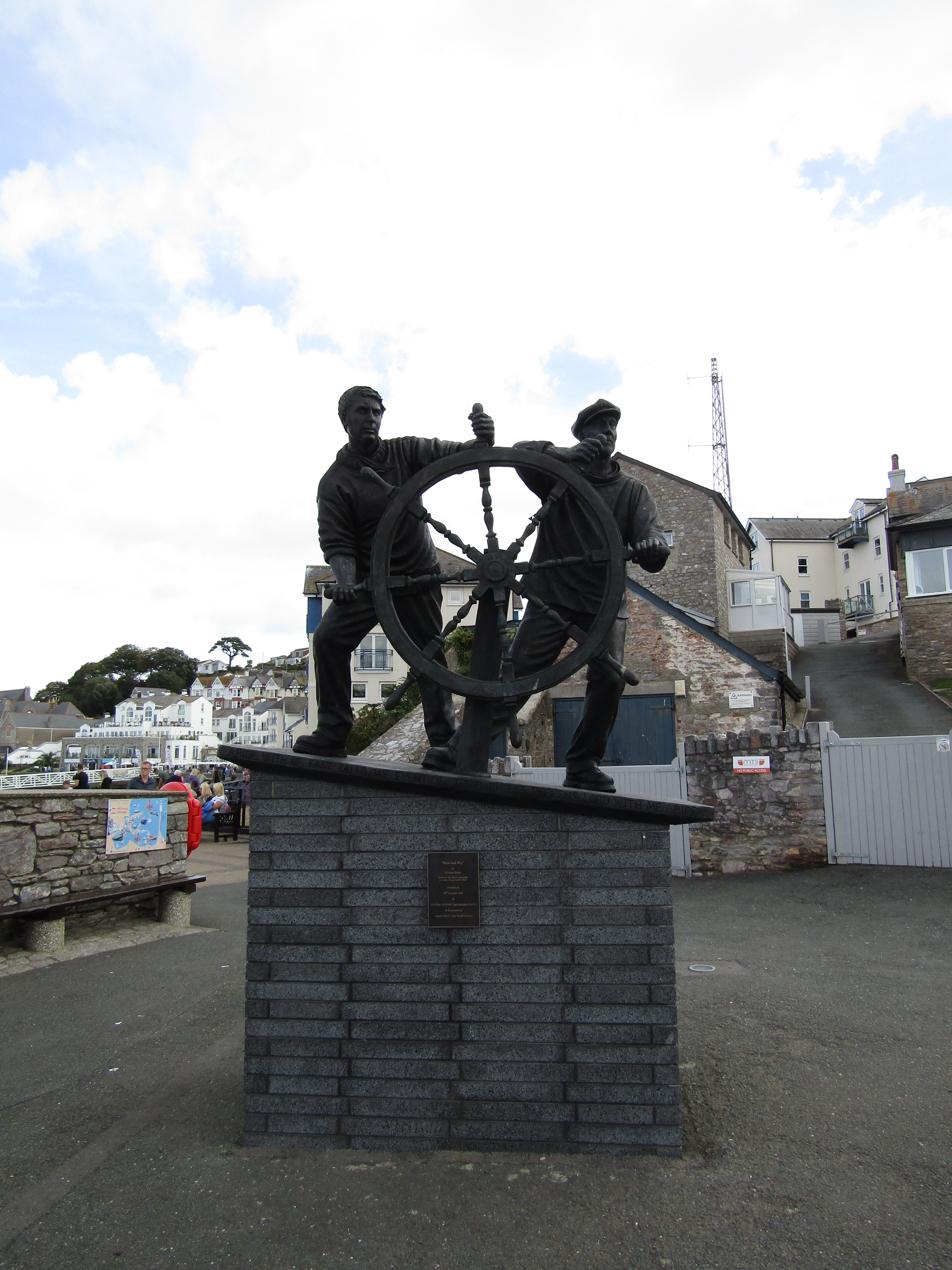
- Location: King's Quay, Brixham, Devon, England
- Coordinates: 50.397145°N 3.510708°W
- Designer: Elisabeth Hadley
- Type: Statue
- Material: Bronze
- Dedicated to: Brixham's fishing heritage and lives lost at sea

Man and Boy is a statue situated at King's Quay on the harbour of Brixham, Devon, England. It is the result of a long fundraising effort; the residents of the town raised £76,000 for its construction. The monument was created in clay by the local sculptor Elisabeth Hadley and cast in bronze in Shropshire.

== Description ==
The statue is a life-size sculpture of two fishermen, a man and a boy, behind a large ship's wheel.

A plaque on the statue's pedestal reads:

'Man and Boy'

by

Elisabeth Hadley

(based on 'The Wheel', an etching

by Arthur Briscoe 1873–1943)

Unveiled on

26th November 2016

by

Len Scott – RNMDSF Superintendent (Retired)

in the presence of

Angela Gilbert – High Sheriff of Devon

== History ==
The charity FISH (Fishermen In Sculptural Heritage, registered charity number 1135142) was set up to raise funds for the construction of the statue. The voluntary committee which had been drawn from local businesses, seafaring families, councillors and representatives from the Fishermen's Mission in Torbay, began fundraising in 2008.
