= Saint Martin, Guernsey =

Parish in southeastern Guernsey

St. Martin
- Parish
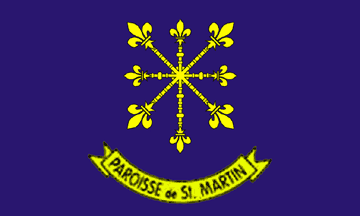
- Flag

- Location of St. Martin in Guernsey
- Coordinates: 49°26′13″N 2°33′25″W
- Crown Dependency: Guernsey, Channel Islands

Government
  - Electoral district: South East

Area
  - Total: 7.3 km^{2} (2.8 sq mi)

Population (2019)
  - Total: 6,593
  - Density: 900/km^{2} (2,300/sq mi)
- Time zone: GMT
  - Summer (DST): UTC+01
- Website: stmartinsconstables.com

Saint Martins (Guernésiais and French Saint Martins; historically Saint-Martin-de-la-Bellouse) is a parish in Guernsey, The Channel Islands. The islands lie in the English Channel between Great Britain and France.

The postal code for street addresses in this parish begins with GY4.

The old Guernésiais nickname for people from Saint Martin is dravans.

In 1883, Pierre-Auguste Renoir spent the summer in Guernsey, with a varied landscape of beaches, cliffs and bays, where he created fifteen paintings in little over a month. Most of these feature Moulin Huet, a bay in Saint Martin. These paintings were the subject of a set of commemorative postage stamps issued by the Bailiwick of Guernsey in 1983.

The parish church of Saint Martin was consecrated on 4 February 1199. At the gate to the churchyard is La Gran'mère du Chimquière, a statue menhir.

St. Martin Parish has entered Britain in Bloom for a number of years, winning the small town category twice, in 2006 and 2011.

== Geography ==
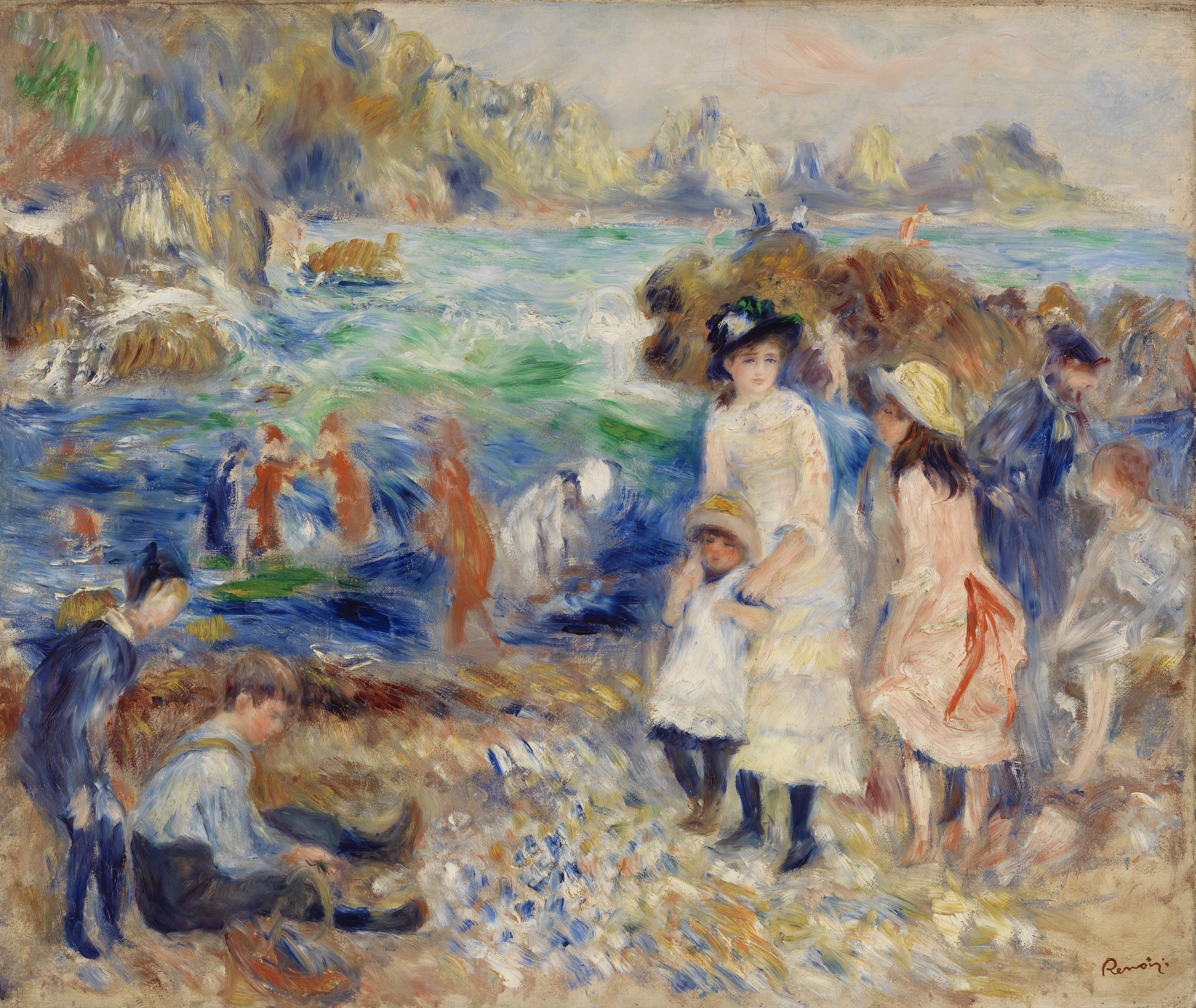
Children on the Beach of Guernsey, 1883, a painting of Petit Port by Pierre-Auguste Renoir

Saint Martin is located in the southeast of Guernsey. The parish borders the Forest on the southwest, Saint Andrew northwest, and Saint Peter Port on the northeast. Saint Martin also has a very small detachment to the west. The detachment is an exclave which is not contiguous with the rest of the parish.

The parish itself is made up of four Cantons, these being; Canton des Hamelins, Canton de Hatenez, Canton de Bon Port and Canton de Fermain. Three Douzeniers are responsible for each Canton.

- Canton de Fermains - from the Rectory, along the main road (Rue au Pretre) and over the Camps du Moulin to the top of the Rue Jacques Guille, through the Ruette Rabey and down the Water Lane to Moulin Huet bay. From here by way of the cliffs to Fermain bay, up the lane, along Ruette Saumarez and back to the Rectory, taking in Les Blanches Pierres lane.
- Canton des Hamelins - from the Rectory along La Bellieuse road to the Church, and through La Ruette du Camp to Le Carrefour au Lievre. From here, following the boundaries of St Peter Port and St Andrew to Les Naftiaux, returning by way of Le Champ Berceau, La Quevillette and the Grande Rue to the Rectory.
- Canton de Hatenez - From the Rectory along the Rue Maze (including the Rue des Caches), Les Cornus, and reaching out to the boundaries of the Canton des Hamelins on the one side, and the boundaries of St Andrew and the Forest on the other, to Petit Bot bay, returning by way of the valley road (including La Huret) to Les Pages, the Ruette Cotelle, Le Clos auBarbier, Les Cornus and the Rue Maze (including La Longue Rue and Burnt Lane) to the Rectory.
- Canton de Bon Port - from the Rectory along Rue des Coutures (including Ruette des Escaliers), Rue des Gron, La Villette to Rue Cotell, Les Croutes and to the bottom of La Falaise road. From here by way of the cliffs to Moulin Huet valley (bottom of the Water lane) returning up the valley and through the Rue Jacques Guille and the Ruette de la Vallee to the Rectory.

Saint Martin is one of the most expensive parishes in the island for property, with the average four bedroom house costing £615,000.

Relief: Saint Martin is the second highest parish in Guernsey, its elevation is exceeded only by the Forest. The highest areas in the parish are in the central portion, located around Carmel (approx 110m) but this gently slopes down to the boundaries, where on the coast, the parish is delineated by steep cliffs.

== Features ==
The features of the parish include:

- Churches
  - St Martin's Parish Church
  - St Martin's Mission Methodist Church
  - Les Camps Methodist Church
- La Gran'mère du Chimquière
- St Martin village
- Sausmarez Manor
- Artparks Sculpture Park
- Military:
  - Parish war memorial at parish hall
  - Tower 14, Saints Bay
  - Bec du Nez Battery dating from the Napoleonic Wars
  - La Moye Battery dating from the Napoleonic Wars
  - Mont-Au Nord Battery dating from the Napoleonic Wars
  - German fortifications, built during the occupation 1940-45
- Doyle Monument
- Jerbourg castle
- A number of protected buildings
- Jerbourg Point, the most southeasterly point in the island
- Moulin Huet Bay, a large area of water that includes Saint's Bay, Moulin Huet, and Petit Port.
- Icart Point
- Abreuveurs / Fontaines
  - Canton des Hamelins
    - Les Hubits - fountain and drinking trough, border with St Peter Port
    - Les Hubits (La Mare Mado) - pump and drinking trough
    - Steam Mill Lanes (Douit de la Porte) - drinking trough
    - Les Huriaux (La Vallee) - drinking trough
    - Les Quartre Vents - drinking trough
    - Les Merriennes - fountain and drinking trough
    - La Bellieuse (Le Douit) - fountain and drinking trough
  - Canton des Hatenez
    - Le Becquet - fountain and drinking trough
    - Les Mourants - drinking trough, border with St Andrew
    - Les Mouilpied - path leading to fountain and drinking trough
    - Les Pages - path leading to drinking trough
    - Les Pages (Rue de la Fallaize) - fountain and drinking trough
    - Les Nicolles - fountain
  - Canton de Bon Port
    - La Villette - fountain, pump and drinking trough
    - Le Navet - two fountains and drinking trough
    - Saints Bay Road (Le Douit) - fountain and drinking trough
    - Bon Port (Douit es Tardifs) drinking trough
    - La Fosse (next to Chapel) - drinking trough
    - Fosse de Bas (Ruette a l'Eau) - drinking trough
    - Rue Jacques Guille - fountain
    - Le Rocher (Rue du Moulin Huet) - fountain
    - Moulin Huet (Les Ruettes des Ollivets) - fountain and drinking trough
  - Canton de Fermains
    - Ville Amphrey - fountain and drinking trough
    - Le Vallon (Fontaine du Hurel) - pump and drinking trough, see "Actes" of the Royal Court, dated 23 July 1828, 24 March 1829 and 12 January 1832.
    - Courtes Falaises - fountain and drinking trough
    - Petit Port - fountain on slipway
    - Jerbourg (Fontaine Cocquerel, near gravel pits overlooking Petit Port
    - Jerbourg (La Moye) - Fountain
    - Jerbourg (Fountaine Ricquart, Mont au Nord) - fountain
    - Jerbourg (Fountain de la Rocque) - fountain, public right of way via driveway leading to Idlerocks Hotel
    - La Bouvee - fountain and drinking trough
    - Calais (Gypsy Lane) - fountain and drinking trough
    - Le Varclin - fountain and drinking trough
    - Les Maindonnaux - drinking trough
- Beaches
  - part of Petit Bot Bay /ˈpɛti ˈboʊ/
  - Saint's Bay
  - Moulin Huet /ˈmʊlɪn ˈwɛt/
  - Petit Port
  - Divette
  - Marble Bay - also known as Le Pied du Mur
  - Part of Fermain Bay

The parish of the St Martin's hosts:

- St Martin's Douzaine Room
- St Martin's Parish Hall
- St Martin's Community Centre
- St. Martins A.C.
- a number of hotels, pubs and restaurants
- St Martin's primary school
- Countryside walks

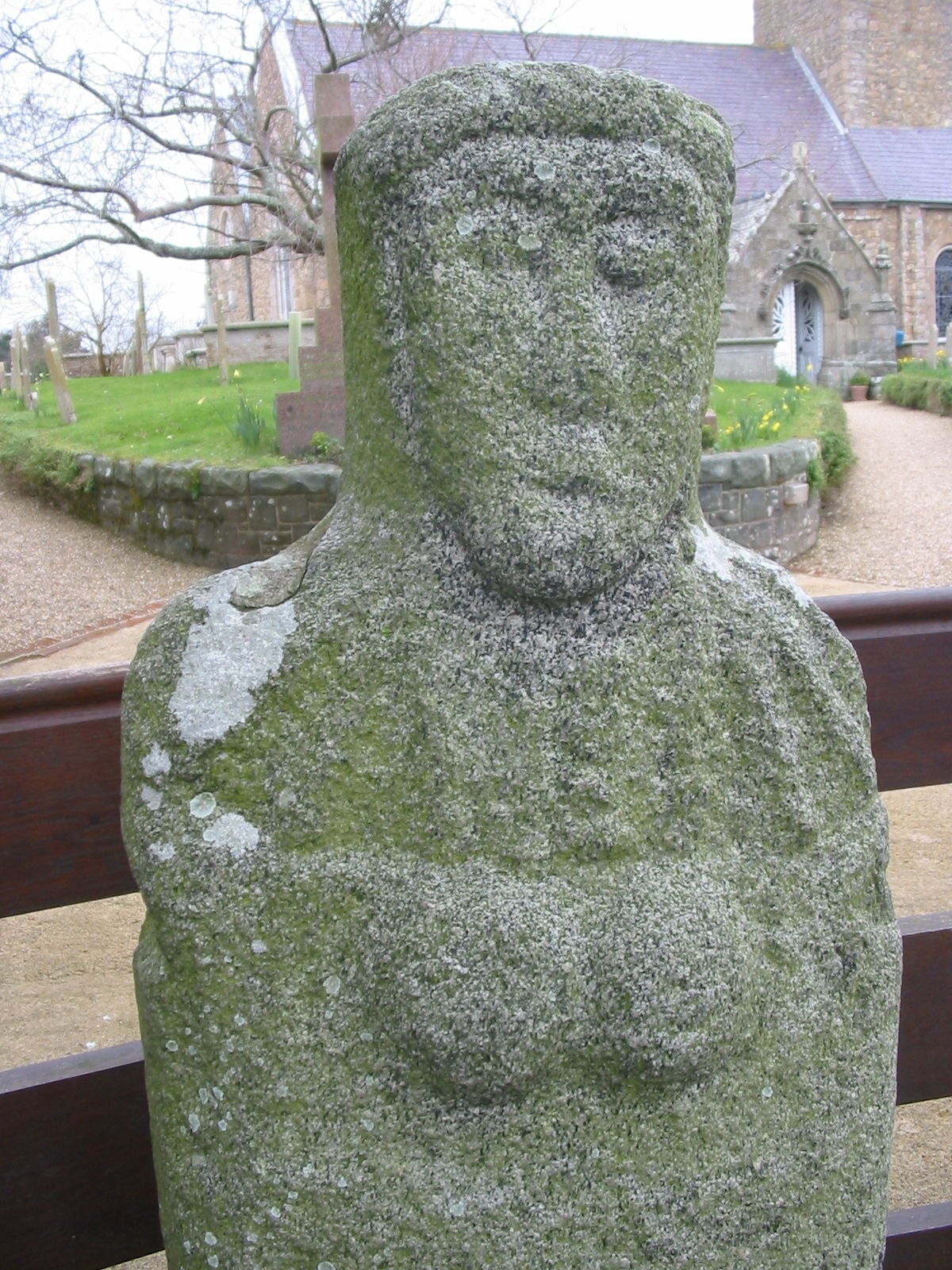
La Gran'mère du Chimquière, the Grandmother of the Cemetery, the statue menhir at the gate of the Saint Martin parish church is an important prehistoric site

== Main roads ==
The following roads provide important links between Saint Martin and the other parishes (listed from southwest to northeast):

- Forest Road leads to the Forest and the western portion of the island,
- Les Varioufs leads to Saint Andrew's and the northwestern portion of the island,
- Fort Road leads to Saint Peter Port, the east coast, and the northern portion of the island.

The following roads are also very important, as they provide access to the village centre and most of the shops (listed from west to east):

- Rue Maze
- La Grande Rue
- Route de Saumarez

== Politics ==
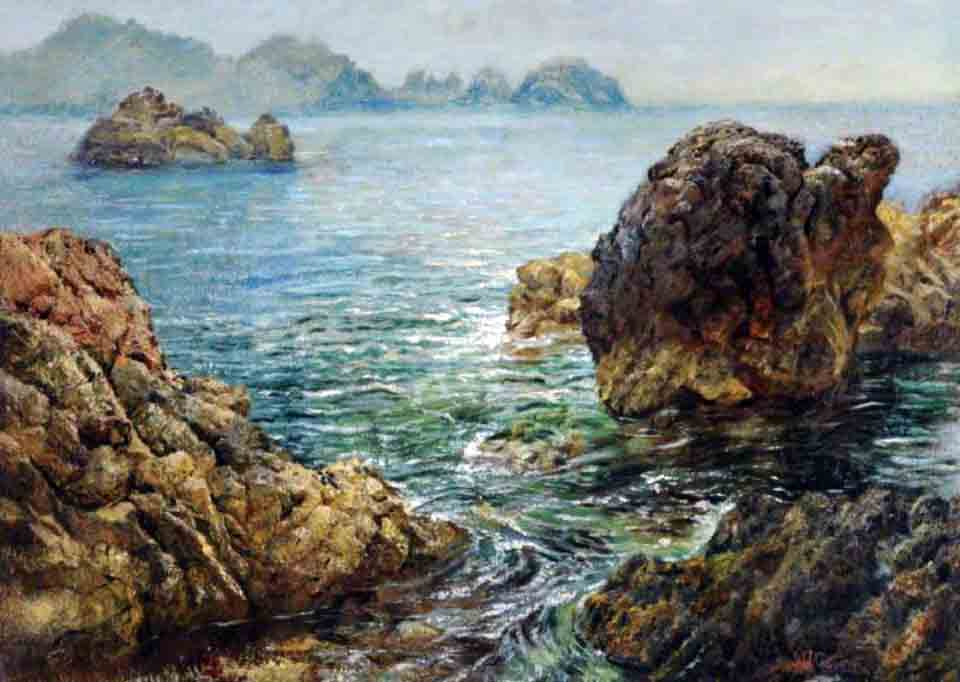
Cradle Rock and Pea Stacks, by William John Caparne

St Martin comprised part of the South East administrative division with St Andrew, until the 2018 referendum implemented a single constituency.

In the 2016 Guernsey general election there was a 3,363 or 73% turnout to elect five Deputies. Those elected (in order of votes received) being Heidi Soulsby, Lindsay De Sausmarez, Peter Roffey, Rob Prow and Victoria Oliver.

The Parish is administered by a Douzaine, made up of twelve parishioners, known as Douzeniers. Douzeniers are elected for a four-year period, three Douzeniers being elected on rotation by parishioners at a parish meeting in November each year. The senior Douzenier is known as the Doyen (Dean). Two elected Constables (Connétables) carry out the decisions of the Douzaine, serving for between one and three years. The longest serving Constable is known as the Senior Constable and his or her colleague as the Junior Constable.

The Parish also has an office situated at the Parish Hall which is open most weekday mornings and manned by the Parish clerk, who is Anita Leale and has been in post for 5 years. Details of the current Douzeniers and Constables can be found on the Parish website. The Douzaine levy an Occupiers Rate on properties to provide funding for running of the administration.

== Notable people ==
- Lee Savident (1976-) cricketer.
- G.N. Georgano, award-winning author.
- William Caparne, artist, had a workshop in an old tram.
- Heidi Soulsby, politician
