= The Death of Major Peirson, 6 January 1781 =

Painting by John Singleton Copley

The Death of Major Peirson
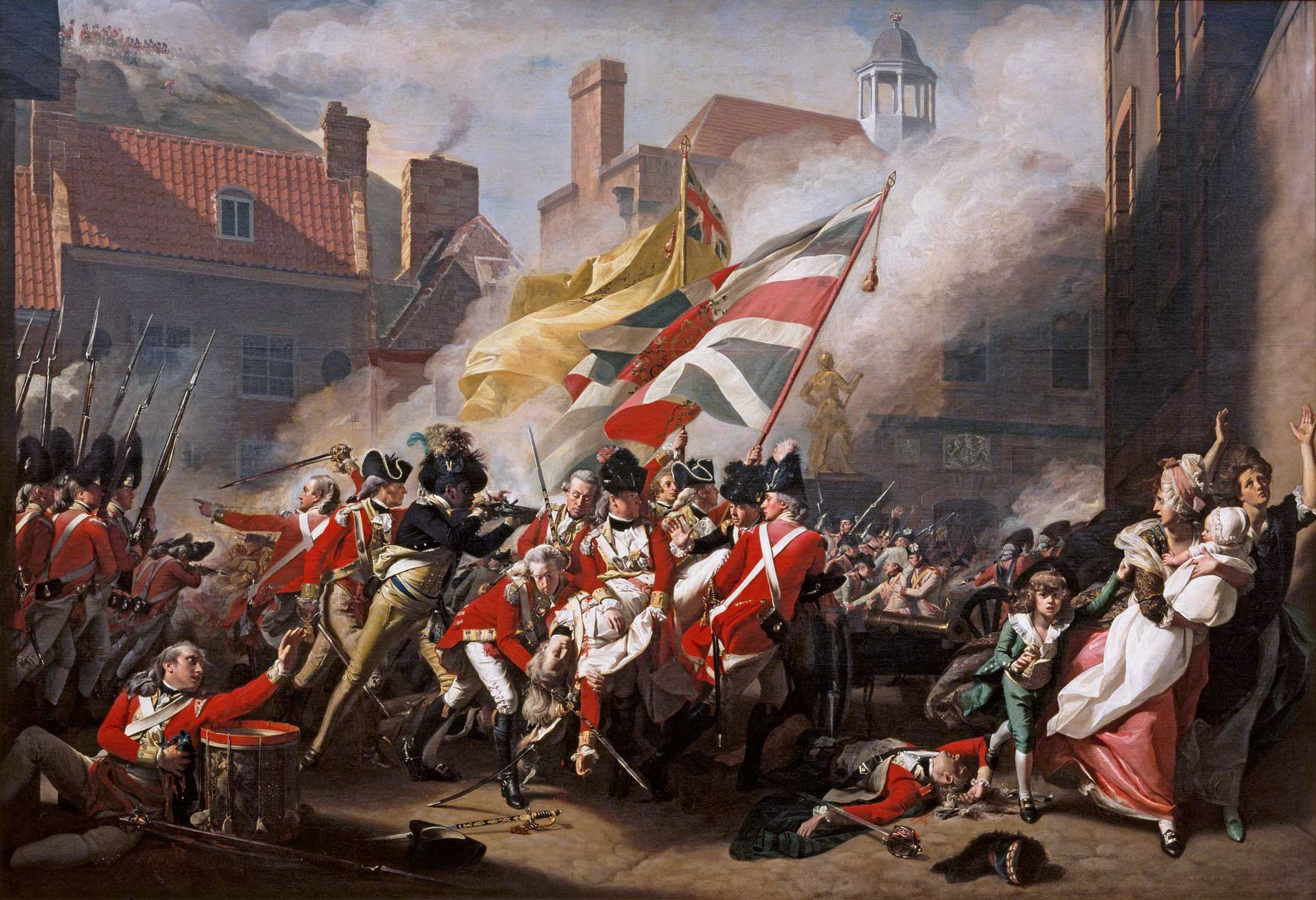
- Artist: John Singleton Copley
- Year: 1783
- Medium: Oil on canvas
- Dimensions: 251 cm × 365 cm (99 in × 144 in)
- Location: Tate Britain; London

The Death of Major Peirson, 6 January 1781 is a large 1783 oil painting by the Anglo-American artist John Singleton Copley. It depicts the death of Major Francis Peirson at the Battle of Jersey on 6 January 1781, part of the Anglo-French War (1778–1783).

== Background ==
The Battle of Jersey was the last French attempt to seize the island of Jersey, and one of the last battles with invading forces from a foreign nation in the British home islands. (Note: The Battle of Culloden in 1746 was the last pitched battle on the British mainland; the Battle of Fishguard involved a short-lived French invasion of Wales in February 1797, and a French expeditionary force fought at the Battle of Ballinamuck in the Irish Rebellion of 1798.) The invasion was organized privately by Baron Philippe de Rullecourt but funded and supplied by the French government, and was intended to remove the threat that British naval vessels and privateers based in Jersey posed to French shipping (and American ships in the American Revolutionary War).

Approximately 1,000 French soldiers, commanded by de Rullecourt and an Indian, Mir Sayyad, landed at La Rocque, Grouville, overnight on 5–6 January. They occupied St Helier early on the morning of 6 January. They captured the Lieutenant Governor of Jersey, Moses Corbet, in bed. Although Corbet surrendered, Peirson, the 24-year-old commander of around 2,000 troops of the British garrison, refused to surrender. As Peirson organized a counter-attack, a French shot killed him. Lieutenant Philippe Dumaresq of the Jersey militia took command of the British forces, which comprised detachments of the 95th Regiment of Foot, 78th Highlanders, and Jersey Militia. The British forces quickly overwhelmed the French, most of whom surrendered.

== Painting ==
John Boydell, a successful engraver and publisher and Aldermen of the City of London, commissioned Copley to paint a large painting, 251.5 centimetres (99.0 in) by 365.8 centimetres (144.0 in). The scene looks towards the final French resistance in Royal Square, viewed along what is now Peirson Place, with the French soldiers taking their last stand around the statue of George II. Further British reinforcements are visible on the hill at the top left. The statue and some of the buildings depicted still stand (some with bullet holes caused by the battle).

Although Peirson was killed in the early stages of the battle, the painting shows Peirson (at the centre of the painting under the large Union Flag, supported by other officers) being shot down leading the final charge, giving him a more heroic role and fate. To the left, his black servant Pompey avenges his master by shooting the sniper. It is believed that the depictions of the officers supporting the stricken Peirson are true portraits; the black servant of auctioneer James Christie was the model for Pompey, although it is unclear whether a black servant played a role (there is no suggestion in contemporaneous sources). Copley modeled the civilians fleeing to the right on his wife, family nurse and children.

Peirson became a national hero, and the painting drew crowds when it was first exhibited at 28 Haymarket in May 1784, with admission charged at 1 shilling.

Boydell had owned The Death of Major Peirson until his death in 1804; during a 1805 sale of Boydell's collection, Copley reacquired the painting. Subsequently it passed to Copley's son Lord Lyndhurst; from Lord Lyndhurst's collection, The Death of Major Peirson was purchased into the National Gallery, London, in 1864. In 1954, the painting was transferred to the Tate Gallery, where it remains now.

Between 1989 and 2010, a copy appeared on the 10 Jersey pound note, and before that on the 1 pound note.

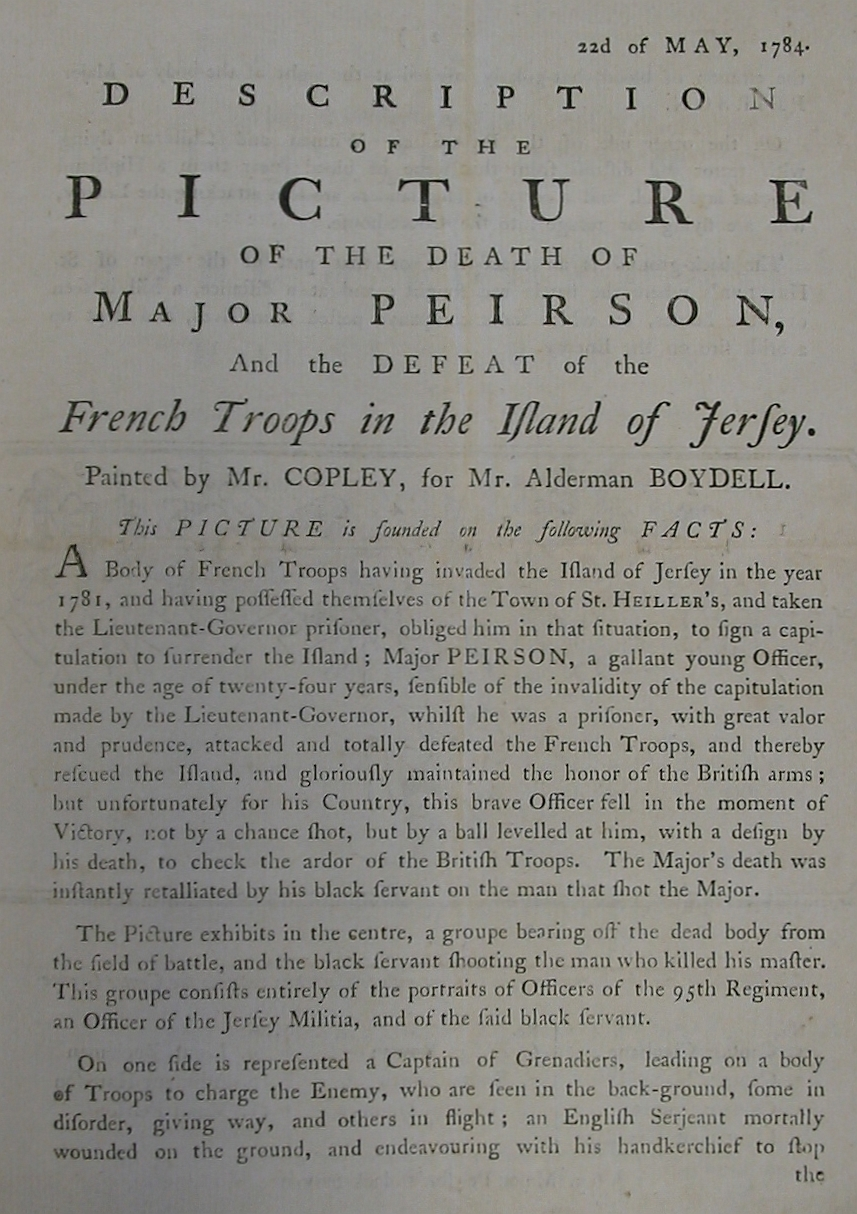
1784 description

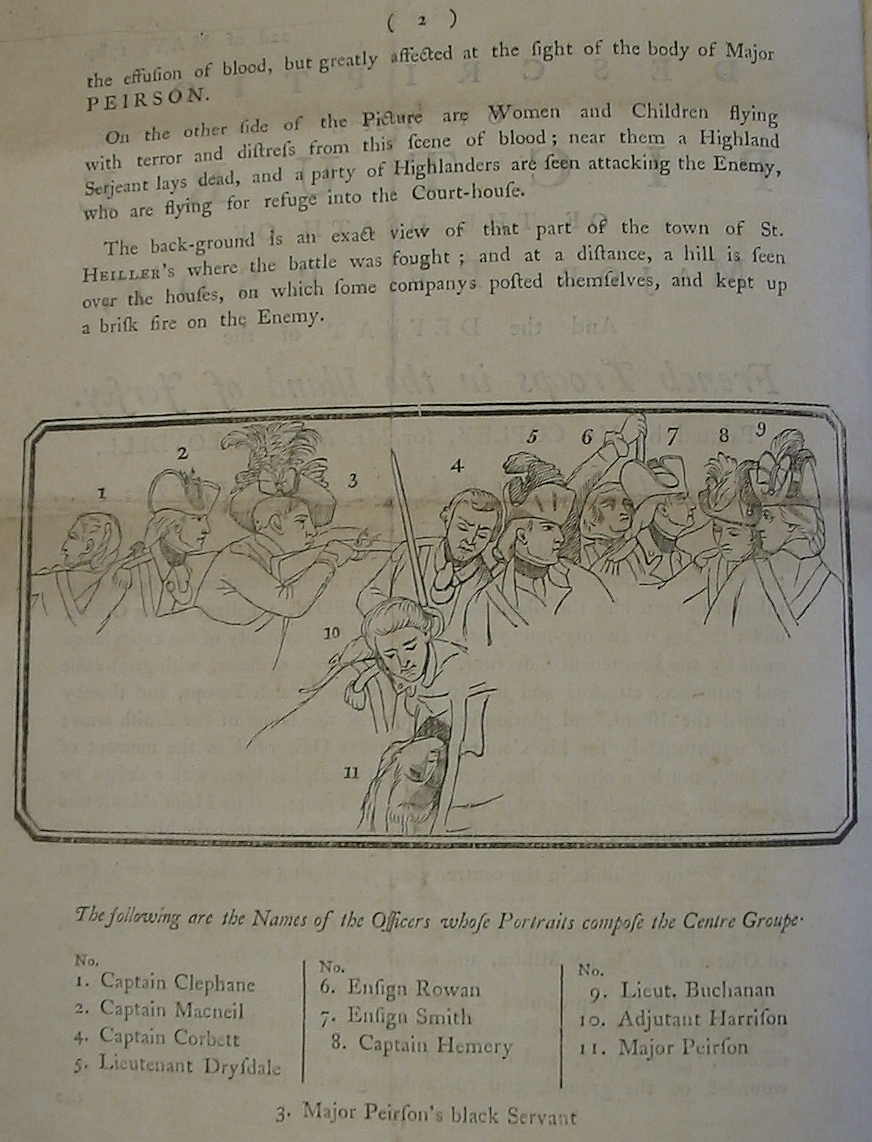

== See also ==
- The Defeat of the Floating Batteries at Gibraltar, September 1782 – Copley's rendition of another battle from the same theatre
- The Death of General Montgomery in the Attack on Quebec, December 31, 1775 – painting by John Trumbull, contemporary of Copley
