= 83rd Regiment of Foot (Royal Glasgow Volunteers) =

British infantry regiment in American Revolutionary War

- Active: 1778–1783
- Country: Great Britain
- Branch: British Army
- Type: Line infantry
- Role: Infantry
- Size: Approximately 1 battalion (about 780–1,000 officers and men)
- Garrison/HQ: Glasgow (1778); Grouville, Jersey (1778–1781); New York (1781–1783)
- Nickname: Royal Glasgow Volunteers
- March: Grand March of the Royal Glasgow Volunteers; The Royal Glasgow Volunteer's Jig; The Royal Glasgow Volunteer's Farewell
- Engagements: American Revolutionary War: Battle of Jersey; British occupation of New York (1781–1783); Evacuation Day (New York)

The 83rd Regiment of Foot (also called the Royal Glasgow Volunteers) was a British infantry regiment that served in the American Revolutionary War. It was created in 1778 and disbanded in 1783, shortly after the war ended.

== History ==
=== Formation ===
In 1778, during the American Revolutionary War, Mr James Finlay, a Glasgow merchant, founder of James Finlay & Co. (father of Kirkman Finlay), together with Mr Ingram (the former Provost) and Mr Gray of Carntyne, resolved to raise an infantry regiment in the service of King George III. Finlay's motives appear to have been a mixture of patriotism and commercial interests - the War was having a detrimental effect on Glasgow's trade with Virginia.

Consequently, at noon on 26 January 1778, a procession of the city's civic dignitaries met at the Town Hall, and marched through the streets of Glasgow in search of recruits. At the head of the procession were the city's Halbardiers led by Mr Gray bearing an enormous sword and acting as Sergeant. The Provost, a Mr Donald, followed, with the Town Council, Deacon-Convener, the fourteen Deacons, assorted dignitaries, and the colours of the regiment, and a large following of gentlemen wearing cockades in their hats. Ingram brought up the rear. Two fifers and two drummers provided music with James Finlay in the centre of the party on the bagpipes.

Initially there was little success - at the end of the first day Ingram observed that they had a piper and a sergeant, but otherwise he was the regiment. Over the next few days, however, the recruits started to come in and the regiment soon reached full strength of one thousand men, including a large number of Irishmen. The attraction of the Regiment was no doubt helped by the £30 bounty offered to recruits - the equivalent of about two and a half year's pay for a private. It was then common practice to draft experienced soldiers into newly raised regiments to give it 'backbone', and members of the 42nd (Black Watch) Highlanders were duly transferred to the 83rd. However, on discovering that they would no longer be allowed to wear the kilt, they mutinied. Once the regiment was raised, it received the name of 'Royal Glasgow Volunteers' and was numbered 83rd in the Line.

=== Jersey and New York ===
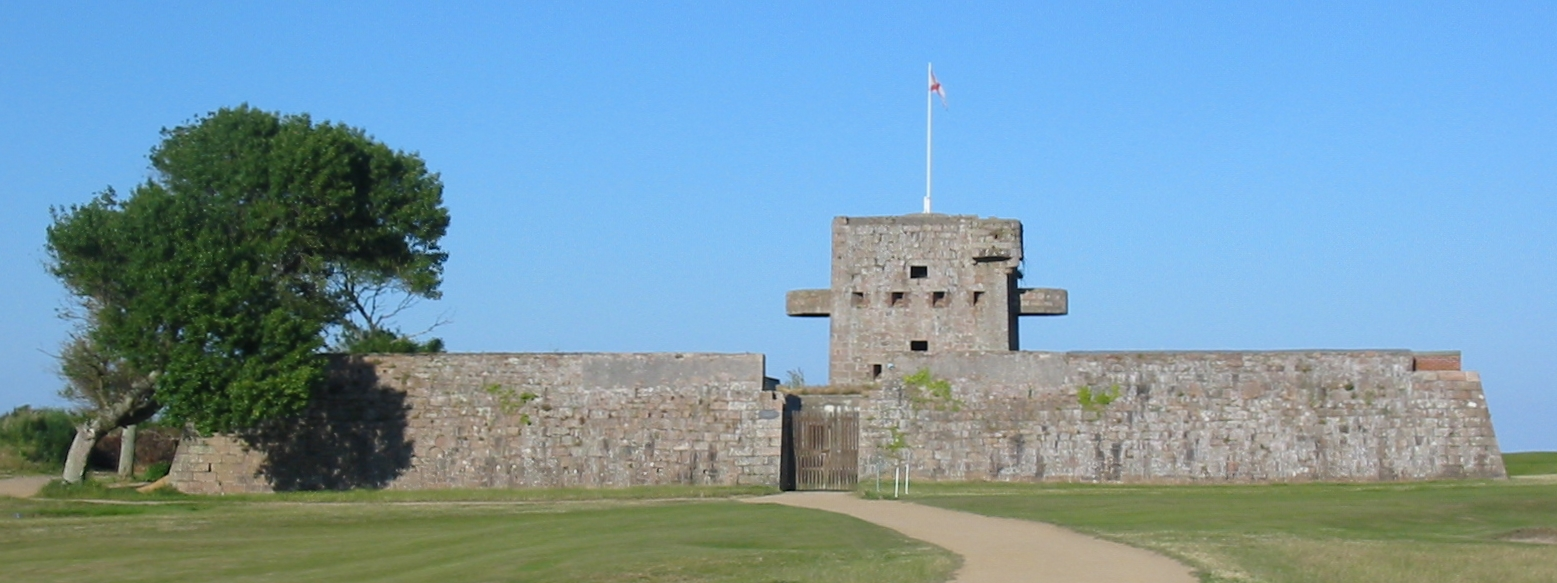
Fort Henry in Grouville, Jersey

Raised in early 1778, the regiment spent some time in training before being sent to the Channel Islands, where it established its headquarters at Fort Conway (now Fort Henry) in the east of Jersey, in the Parish of Grouville. Half the regiment were based here, the other half in the neighbouring Island of Guernsey, the total strength of the regiment at this date being 781. On 6 January 1781 Baron Philippe de Rullecourt landed with a force of French infantry in a bid to capture Jersey. Leaving a detachment of troops at the landing point of La Rocque, Jersey, he proceeded to advance on Saint Helier, where he was eventually defeated at the hands of the 95th Regiment of Foot and 78th (Highland) Regiment of Foot, together with elements of the Jersey Militia, under the command of Major Francis Peirson in an action known as the Battle of Jersey. Meanwhile, the Grenadier Company of the 83rd, led by Captain Campbell, stormed La Rocque Battery and recaptured it from the French. Seven grenadiers were killed during this action.

Later that year the 83rd was transferred to New York, where it remained as part of the garrison of the city until the end of the American Revolutionary War in 1783. It then returned to Glasgow, where it was disbanded.

== Uniform and equipment ==
The regiment wore the standard 1768 uniform of close fitting, long tailed red coat, white waistcoat, white breeches and stockings with black gaiters, black shoes with buckles and a black cocked hat. The grenadier company wore tall black bearskin caps, whilst the Light infantry company would have worn some form of light cap and short spatterdashes rather than gaiters. It was common practice for Grenadiers in the field to abandon their bearskin caps in favour of the more practical cocked hat. Because the 83rd was a Royal Regiment it was entitled to have royal blue 'facings' (collars, cuffs and lapels) augmented by white lace on the button holes. Officers wore an identical uniform, except that the coat was made of a superior scarlet cloth and the lace was gold. However this was usually only worn on formal occasions, and for everyday wear it was usual practice to wear a cheaper cloth, unlaced coat. Two types of button are known to have been used. One was a circular, flat gilt metal button 22mm in diameter, with a simple scroll and dot design surrounding the number '83'. On the back was born the inscription 'S. FIRMIN - STRAND 1771-1780'. The other type was circular, pewter and 24mm in diameter. The inscriptions on the front and back were identical to the gilt version, except without the scroll and dot decoration.

== Regimental music ==
- Grand March of the Royal Glasgow Volunteers;
- The Royal Glasgow Volunteer's Jig;
- The Royal Glasgow Volunteer's Farewell

== Memorial sites ==
- Fort Henry, Grouville, Jersey (closed to the public but viewable from the outside).
- Grenadier's Memorial, Grouville Parish Church graveyard (burial site of the seven grenadiers of the 83rd killed at the Battle of Jersey, 1781).
