= Elizabeth Castle =

Castle on a tidal island in the parish of Saint Helier, Jersey

- Saint Helier, Jersey
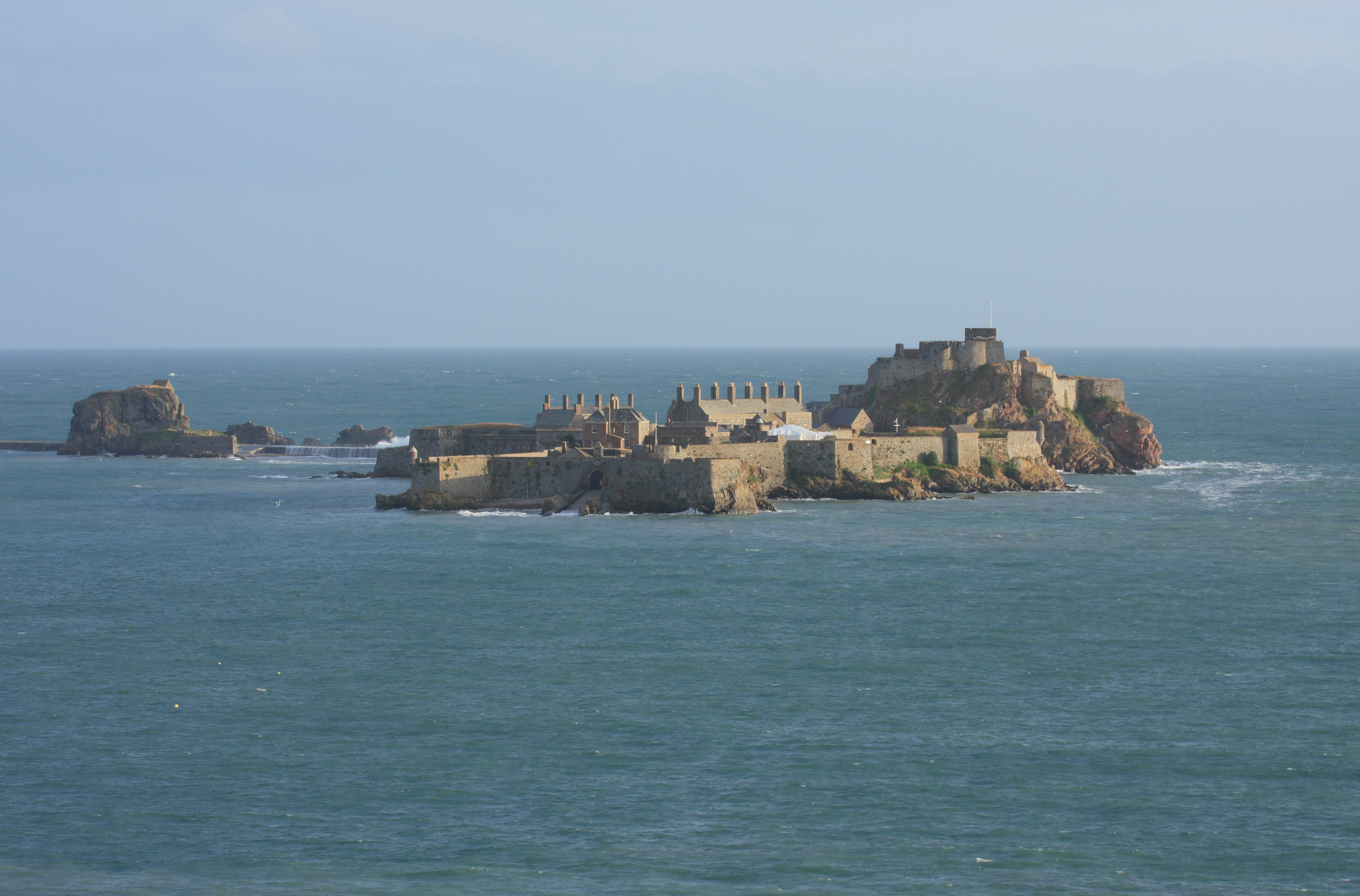
- Elizabeth Castle at high tide

Site information
- Type: Castle
- Owner: People of Jersey
- Controlled by: Jersey Heritage
- Open to the public: Yes
- Condition: Intact

Location
- Location within Channel Islands
- Coordinates: 49.175°N 2.125°W

Site history
- Built: from 1595
- Materials: Granite
- Battles/wars: Battle of Jersey; Third English Civil War

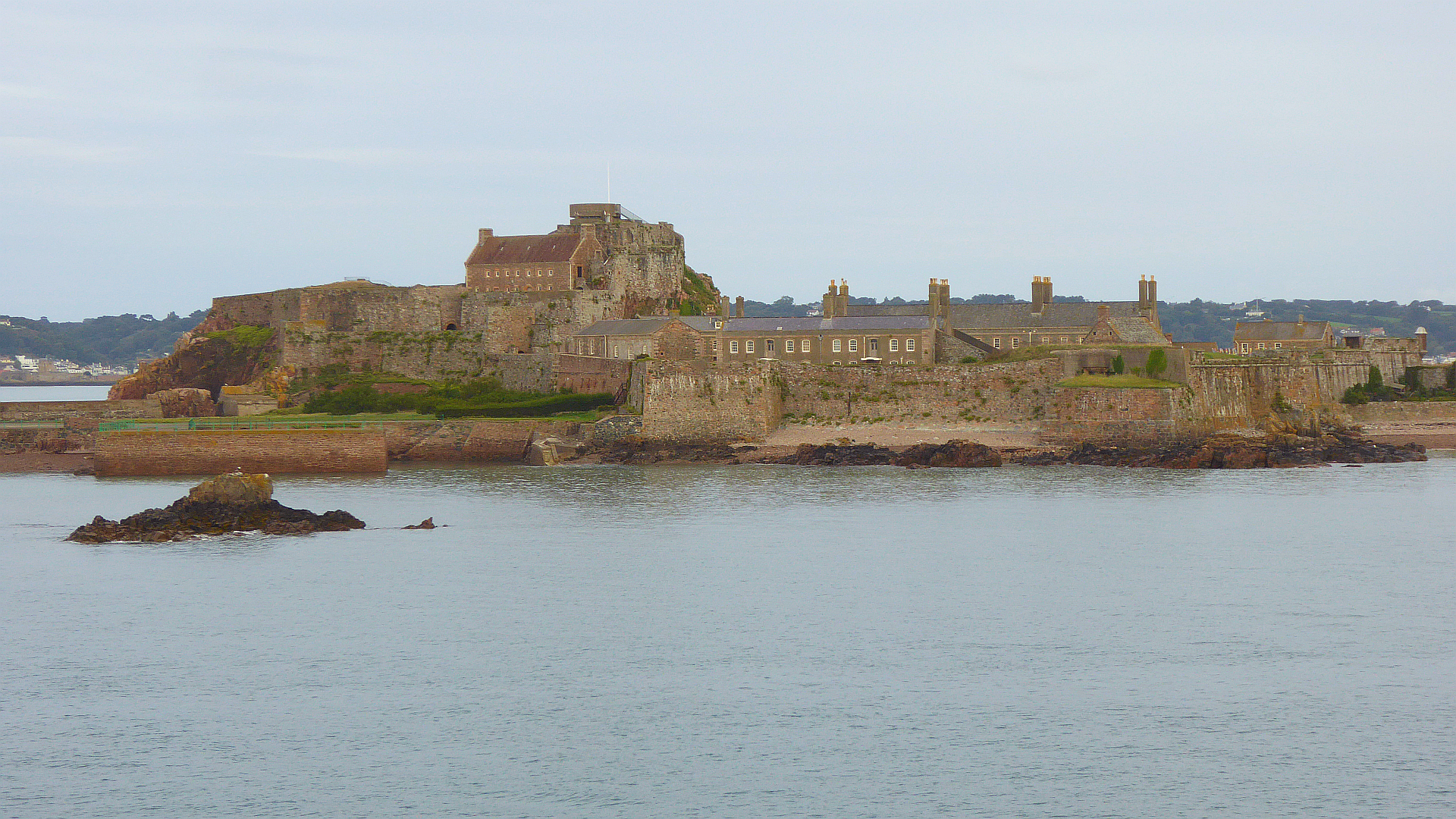
"Elizabeth Castle" from the west with the length of the ensemble of the castle buildings

Elizabeth Castle (Norman: Lé Châté Lîzabé) is a castle and tourist attraction, on a tidal island within the parish of Saint Helier, Jersey. Construction was started in the 16th century when the power of the cannon meant that the existing stronghold at Mont Orgueil was insufficient to defend the Island and the port of St Helier was vulnerable to attack by ships armed with cannons.

It is named after Elizabeth I who was queen of England around the time the castle was built.

== History ==
The tidal island called L'Islet (The Islet) lying in Saint Aubin, Jersey (St Aubin's Bay) became the site of the Abbey (later Priory) of Saint Helier. The Crown confiscated the monastic buildings at the Reformation. Surviving buildings were used for military purposes.

=== 16th century ===
==== Upper Ward ====
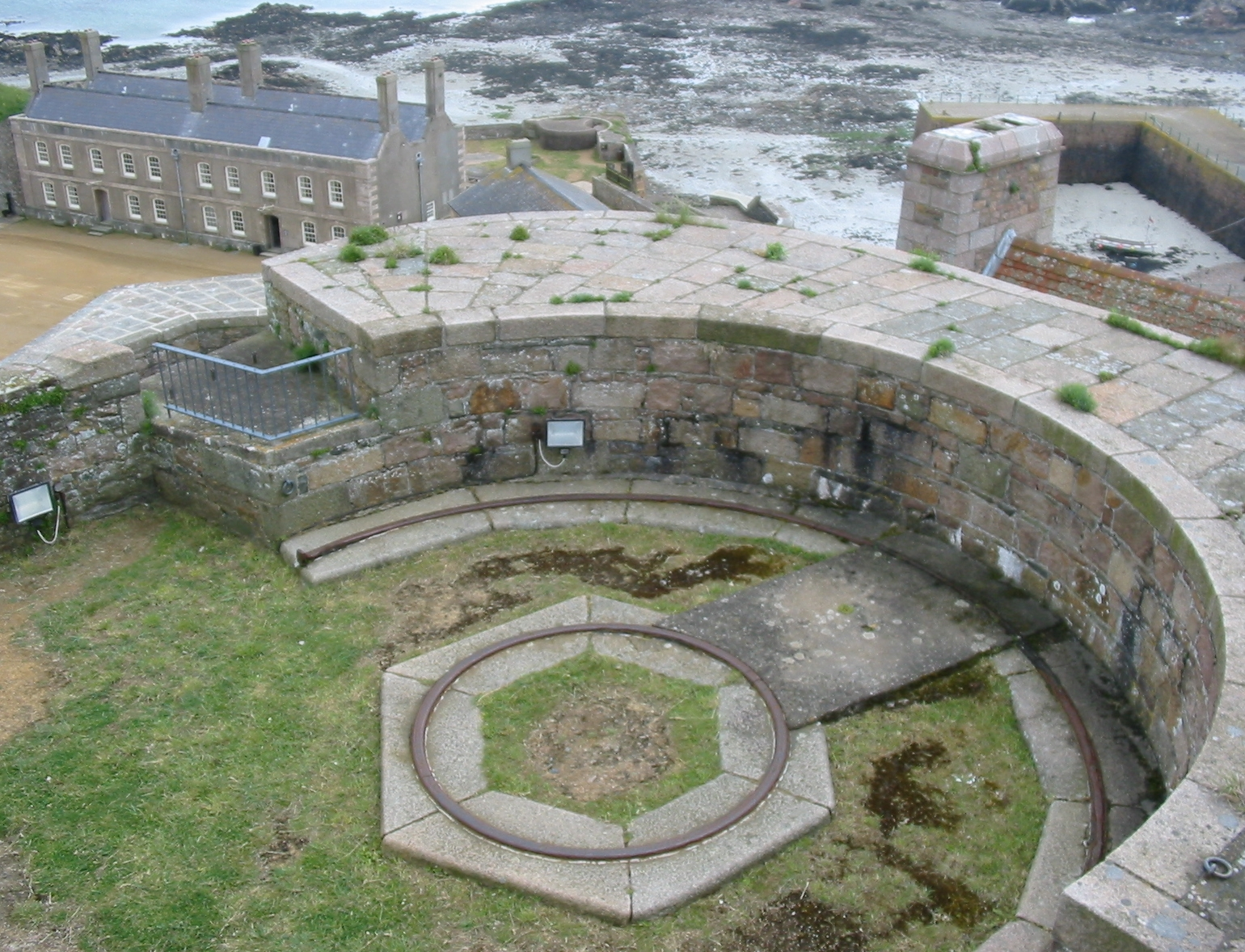
Upper Ward (foreground).

Construction of the earliest parts of the castle, the Upper Ward including the Queen Elizabeth Gate, began in 1594. This work was carried out by the Flemish military engineer Paul Ivy.

Governors of Jersey moved their official residence from Mont Orgueil to Elizabeth Castle.

=== 17th century ===
Sir Walter Raleigh, Governor of Jersey between 1600 and 1603, named the castle Elizabeth Castle after Elizabeth I of England.

==== Lower Ward ====
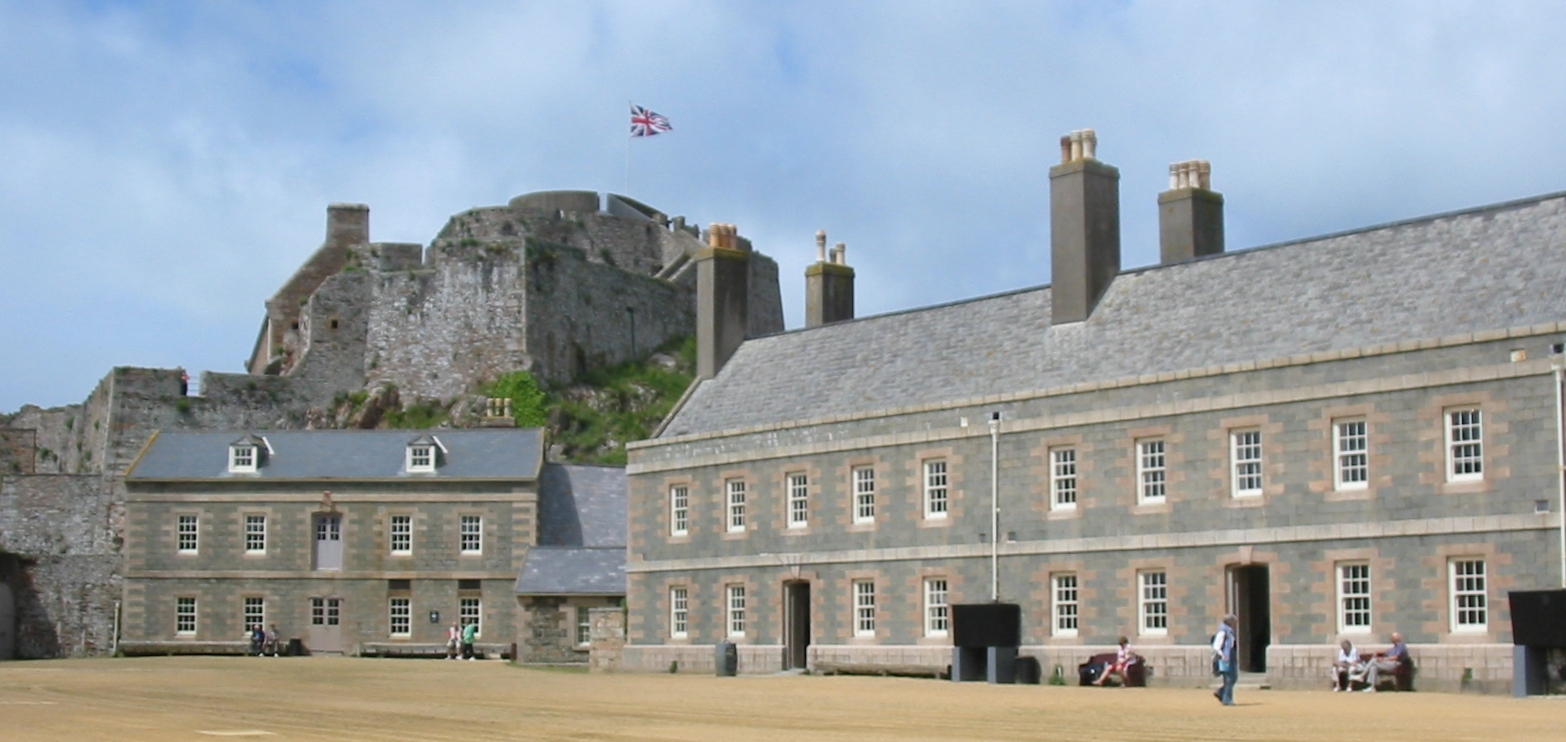
The Lower Ward in 2008. The long terrace on the right is the barrack building

The Lower Ward was constructed, between 1626 and 1636, on the site of the ruined Abbey church. This area of the castle became a parade ground, surrounded by a barrack building and officers' quarters. Wells and cisterns for water existed within this area.

==== English Civil War ====
The castle was first used in a military context during the English Civil War in the 17th century. The Prince of Wales visited the castle in 1646 and again, but now as Charles II in September 1649, staying in the Governor's House, having been proclaimed King by governor Sir George Carteret, despite the abolition of the monarchy in England, in February 1649. In 1651, a windmill was constructed half-way between Fort Charles and the Lower Ward. In the same year, the Parliamentarian forces landed in Jersey and bombarded the castle with mortars. The destruction of the medieval Abbey church in the heart of the castle complex which had been used as the storehouse for ammunition and provisions forced Carteret to surrender on 15 December 1651 after being besieged for seven weeks. Jersey was held by Parliamentarians for the next nine years until the restoration of the monarchy.

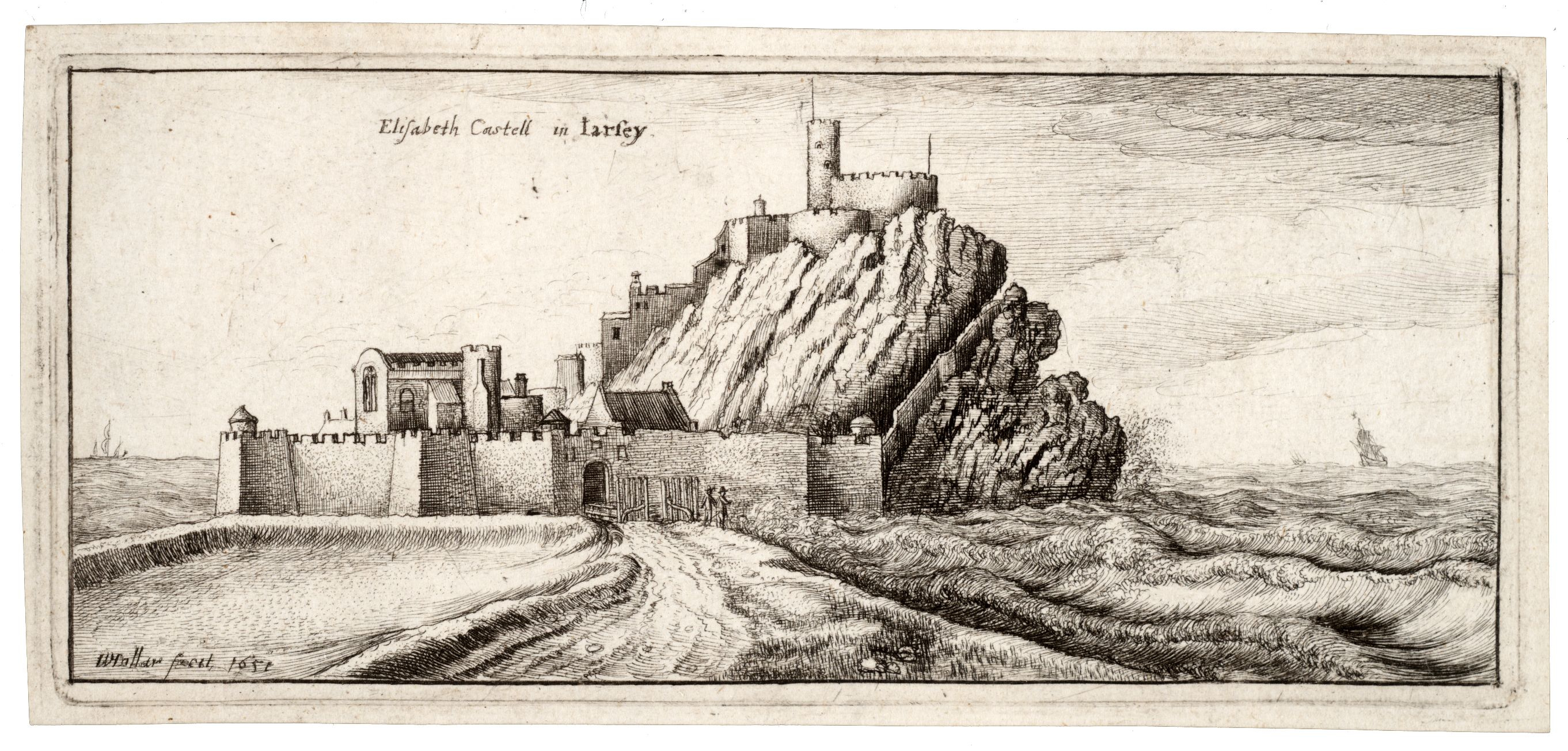
A 1651 depiction of the Castle

In 1668, or shortly afterwards, King William's Gate was constructed, which is located between the Outer Ward, and Lower Ward.

=== 18th century ===
==== Seven Years' War ====
During the Seven Years' War, French prisoners were kept at the island. Perhaps the most well known was Jean-Louis Le Loutre. The castle was next involved in conflict in the late 18th century, this time it was with the French. French troops under Baron Phillipe de Rullecourt landed in St Helier on 6 January 1781, and the castle garrison was marooned. The governor Moise Corbet was tricked into surrendering to the French, but the castle garrison under Captain Mulcaster refused to surrender. The French were eventually defeated by troops under Major Francis Peirson at the Battle of Jersey. Both Peirson and de Rullecourt were killed during the battle.

The perceived vulnerability of the Island led to the construction of Fort Regent on Le Mont de la Ville, purchased by the British government from the Vingtaine de la Ville overlooking the Town. Fort Regent became the site of the main British garrison.

=== 19th century ===
A two-story barracks hospital building was constructed in the early 19th century.

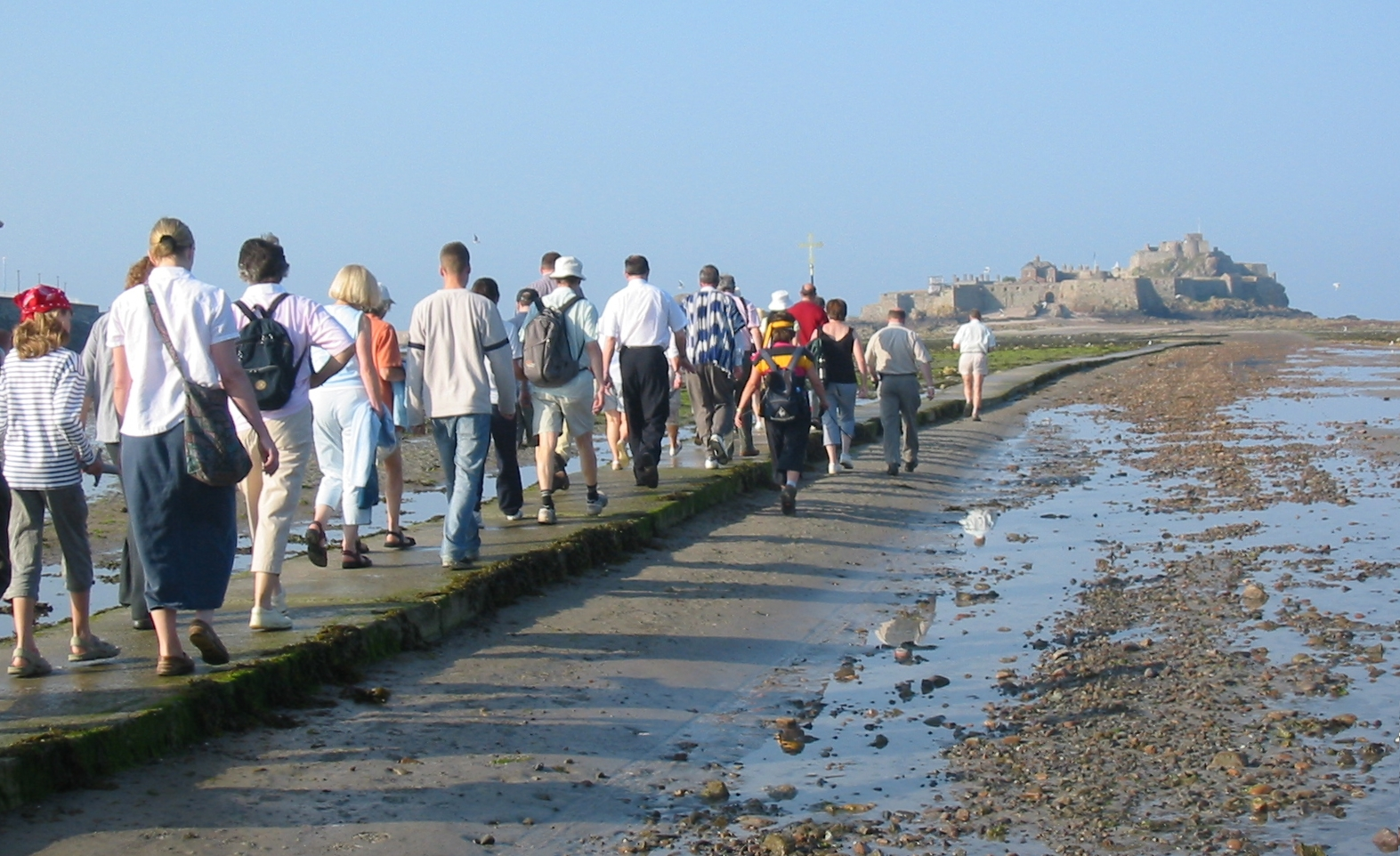
Pilgrims approaching Elizabeth Castle at low tide on Saint Helier's Day Pilgrimage on 17 July 2005

A plan to link the castle to the mainland as part of an ambitious harbour project in the 19th century was abandoned. A breakwater linking L'Islet to the Hermitage Rock on which the Hermitage of Saint Helier is built remains, and is used by anglers.

=== 20th century ===
The British government withdrew the garrison and relinquished the castle to the States of Jersey in 1923. The States then opened it to the public as a museum.

During the Second World War the Germans, who occupied the Channel Islands, modernised the castle with guns, bunkers and battlements. After the Liberation, the castle was repaired and was eventually re-opened to the public.

=== 21st century ===
Each year, on the Sunday closest to St. Helier's Day, 16 July, a municipal and ecumenical pilgrimage is held to visit the Hermitage. As part of the pilgrimage an open-air service is held within the castle. Other cultural events, such as concerts and historical re-enactments are also held from time to time.

On 4 June 2012, a beacon was lit to celebrate Elizabeth II's 60 years of reign. A fireworks display followed.

== Historic monument ==
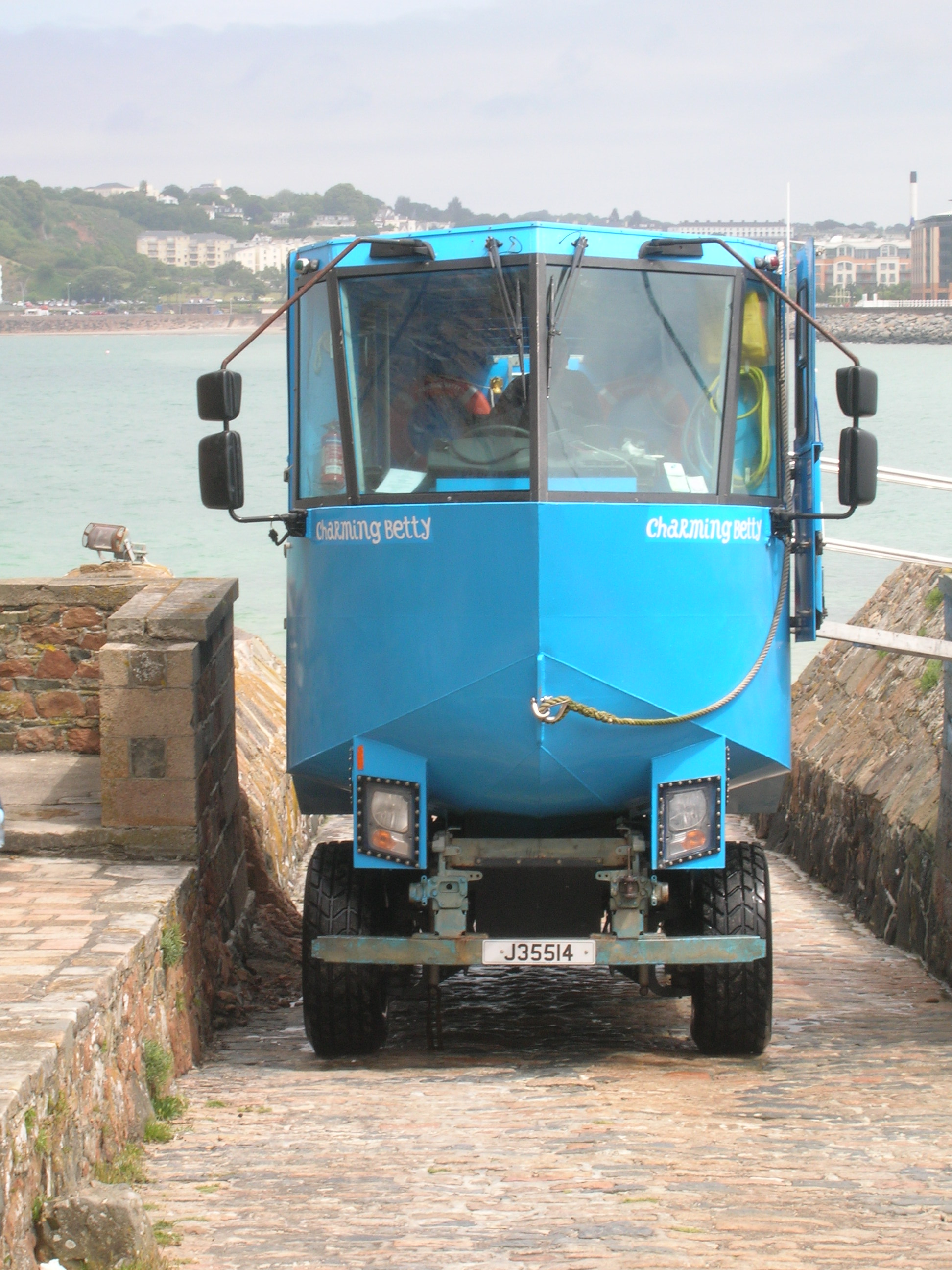
Charming Betty ascending the slipway at Elizabeth Castle, Saint Helier

Today, Jersey Heritage administers the site as a museum. Among the historical displays is the regimental museum of the Royal Jersey Militia that holds several centuries of military memorabilia. There is also a museum that discusses the evolution of cannons and fortifications that holds several pieces from the nineteenth century, and earlier.

Every Sunday through the season when the castle is open, a team of Historical Interpreters recreate the garrison of 1781, at the time of the battle of Jersey. They give displays of musket and cannon firing, and civilian life.

Access to the castle is via a causeway from St Helier at low tide, or on a castle ferry. There are two ferries, Charming Betty and Charming Nancy, which are wading vehicles that can reach the castle regardless of tide height, weather permitting. A one-way trip when the tide is high takes about 15 minutes.

== Sources ==
- Brian Bell (2000), Insight Guide Channel Islands, APA Publications
- A CONSERVATION PLAN for ELIZABETH CASTLE, JERSEY
