= Invasion of Jersey (1779) =

1779 battle

- Part of the Anglo-French War (1778–1783) and American Revolutionary War
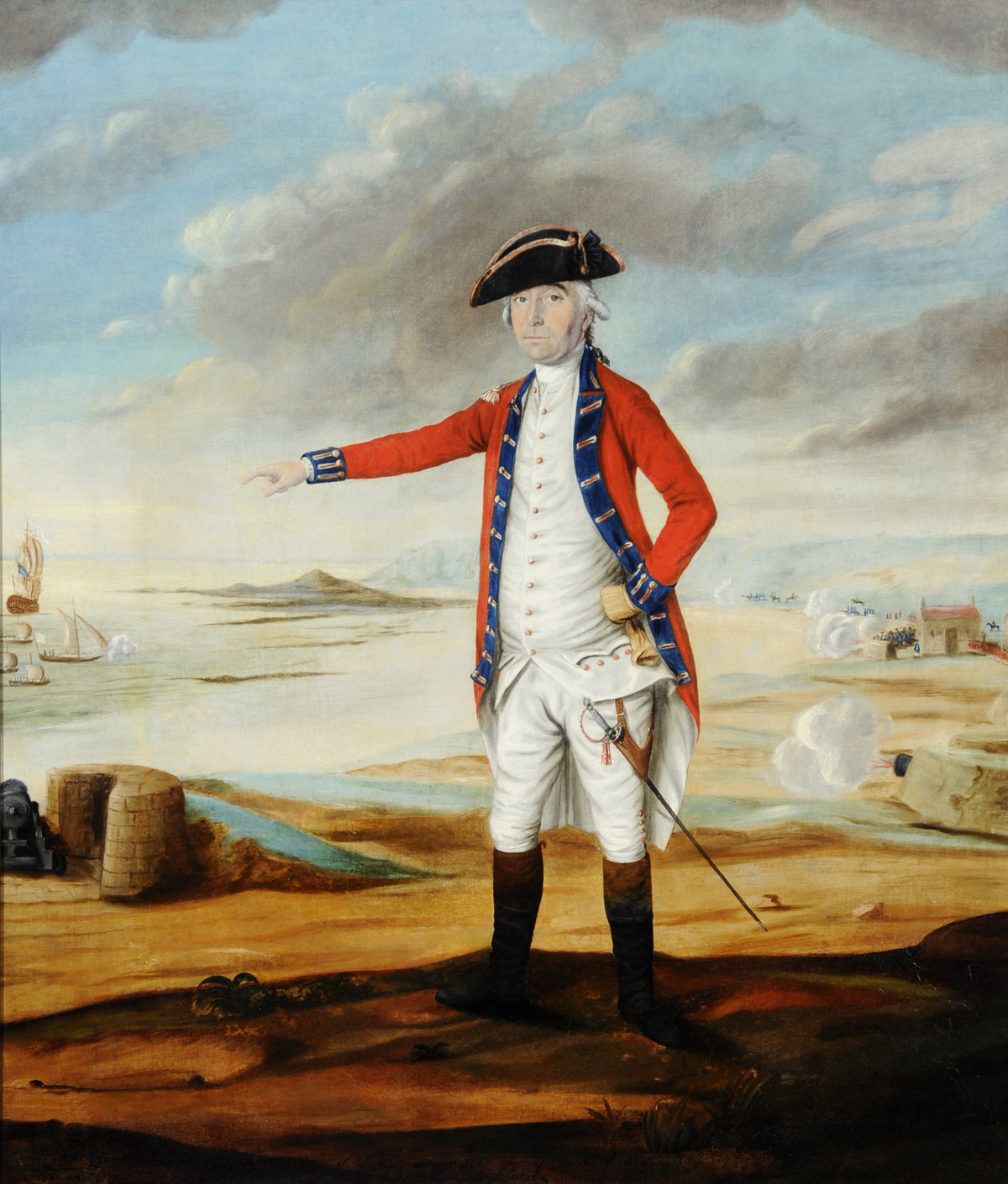
- c. 1779 portrait of Moses Corbet with the invasion in the background
Date	May 1, 1779
Location	Jersey
Result	British victory

Belligerents
Great Britain	France

Commanders and leaders
Moses Corbet; Mariot Arbuthnot	Karl von Siegen; Phillipe Rullecourt

Strength
78th Regiment; Jersey Militia	Several warships

Casualties and losses
Unknown wounded	15–18 drowned 20 captured

The invasion of Jersey was a failed French attack on British-held Jersey in 1779, during the American Revolutionary War.

== Battle ==
A letter from Major Moses Corbet, Lieutenant Governor of Jersey, reported that on 1 May 1779, a French force attempted a landing at St Ouen's Bay. Early that morning, lookouts sighted five large vessels and a great number of boats some three leagues off the coast, proceeding towards the coast in order by a coup de main to effect a landing. Guns on the cutters, and small craft supporting the landing, fired grapeshot at the defenders on the coast. By fast marching, the 78th Regiment of Foot and Jersey militia had arrived in time to oppose the landing, dragging with them some field artillery through the sand of the beaches. The defenders were able to prevent the landing, suffering only a few men wounded when a cannon burst.

As the tide was ebbing, the French warships could not get close enough to support any landing, and without their support, the captains of the transports were unwilling to bring their vessels inshore. By some reports, the first and only vessel that attempted to land was either struck with a shot or dashed upon a rock. Twenty men got ashore and surrendered, 15 or 18 men drowned, and the rest got off safe. The French vessels held off a league from the coast, but eventually left the area.

On 2 May, a vessel from Jersey fell in with a convoy under Admiral Mariot Arbuthnot that had left Spithead en route to North America. Arbuthnot sent the convoy to Torbay and proceeded to the relief of Jersey with his ships. However, when he arrived, he found that Captain Ford of HMS Unicorn had the situation well in hand. Arbuthnot returned to his convoy, but his deviation resulted in the convoy not clearing the Channel until end of June, with consequent hardship for the troops in North America who were awaiting it.

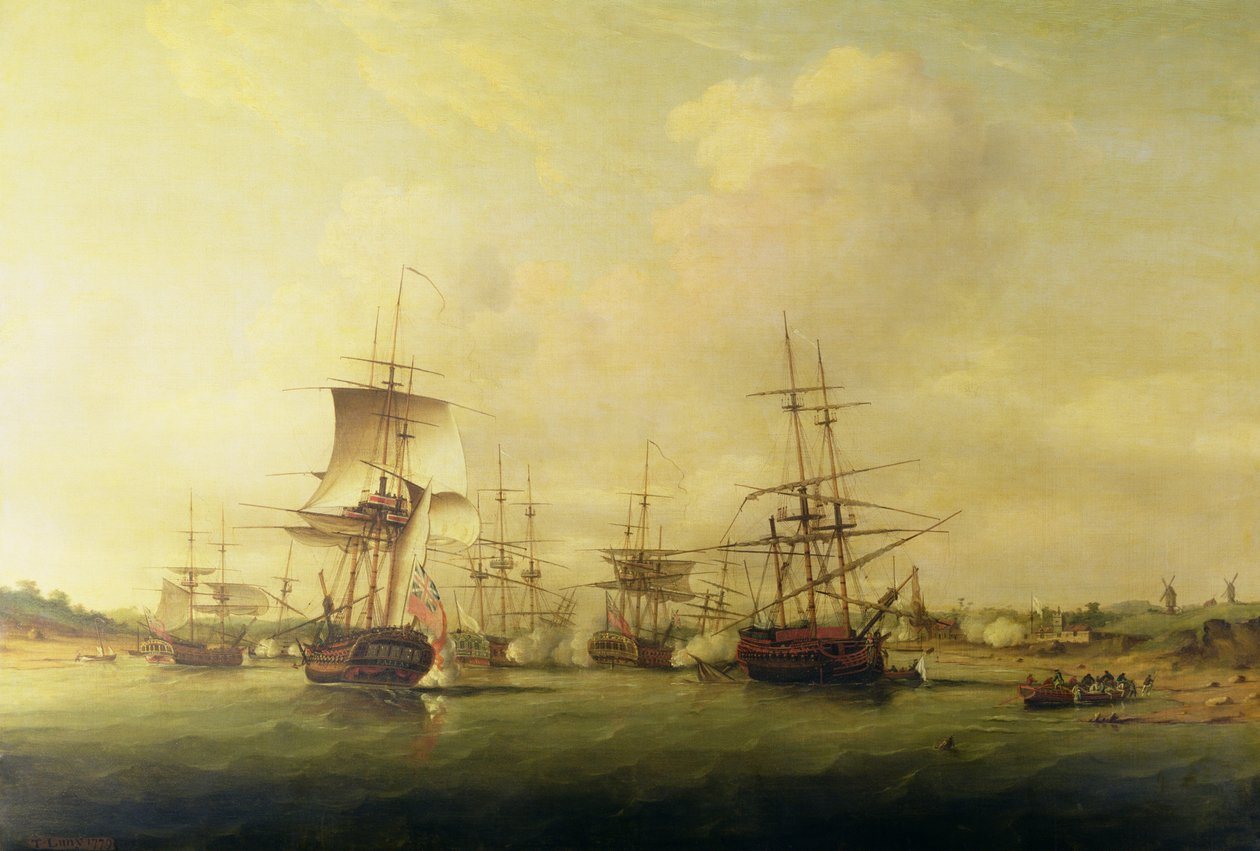
Sir James Wallace in command of HMS Experiment in the action against the French at Cancale Bay on 13 May 1779

On 13 May Captain Sir James Wallace captured the French frigate Danae, and a brig and cutter, in Cancale Bay. The squadron had sailed to the relief of Jersey after the failed French invasion.

== Aftermath ==
In 1787 the British placed a battery of three 24-pounder guns on the spot where the Rector of St Ouen, le Sire du Parcq, had placed guns to repulse the French attack. In 1834, the British built a Martello tower there. Known as Lewis Tower (or St Ouen's No. 1), it survives to this day. During the German occupation of the Channel Islands 1940–1945, the Germans built a large bunker next to Lewis Tower; today it houses the Channel Islands Military Museum.

== Sources ==
- Campbell, John, John Berkenhout, Henry Redhead Yorke, William Stevenson (1817) Lives of the British admirals: containing an accurate naval history from the earliest periods. (Printed for C.J. Barrington, and J. Harris)
