= Royal Militia of the Island of Jersey =

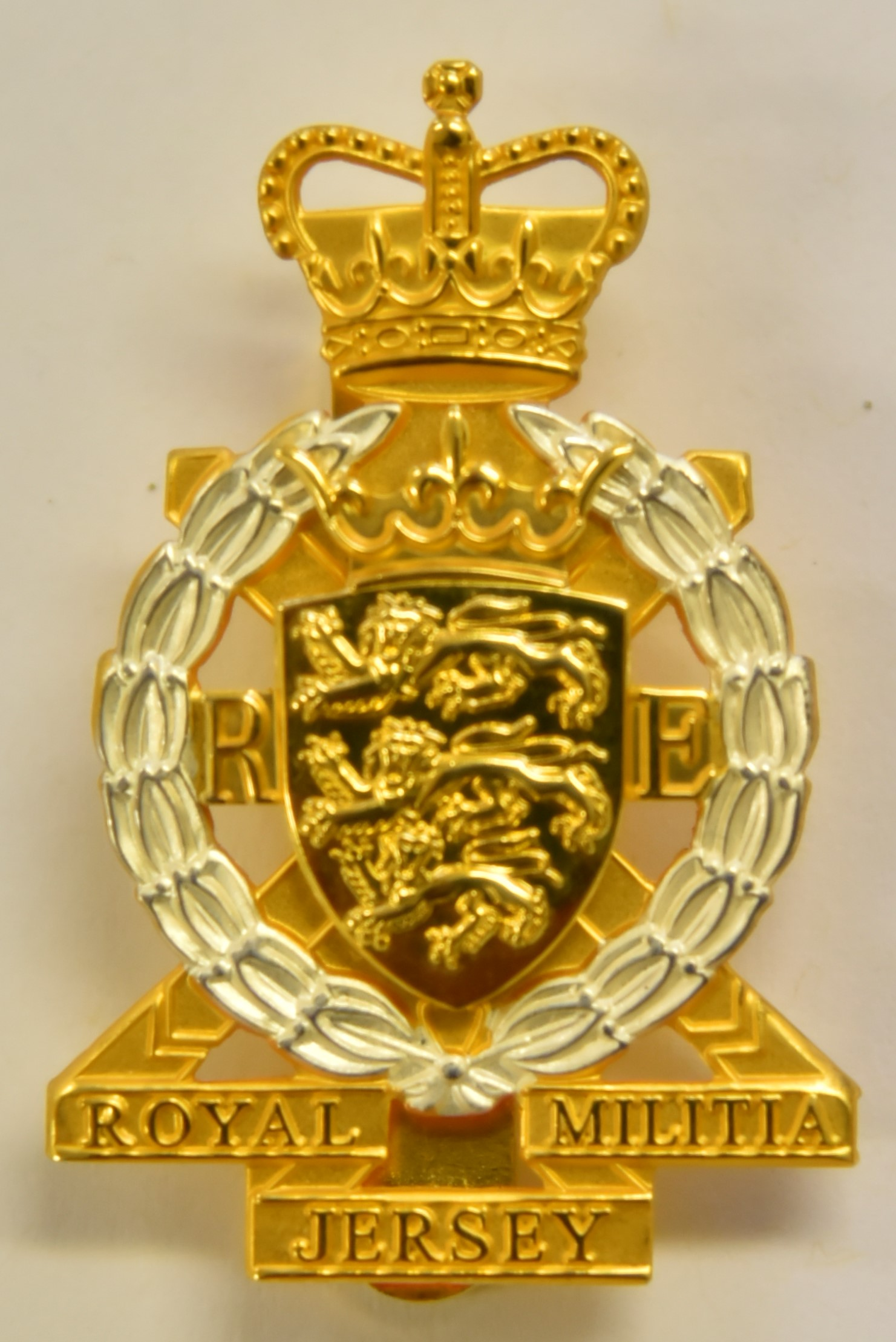
- Badge of the Royal Militia of the Island of Jersey
- Active: 1337–1946, 1987–present
- Country: United Kingdom
- Branch: British Army
- Type: Militia (United Kingdom)
- Role: Military engineers
- Size: Total strength: 64: Officers: 10; Other ranks: 54
- Garrison/HQ: Royal Engineer's Yard, Mount Bingham, St Helier (present day).
- Battle honours: American Revolution; Battle of Jersey; The Great War

Commanders
- Sovereign: Charles III
- Lieutenant Governor: Vice Admiral Sir Jerry Kyd
- Commander-in-Chief: Major Charlie Martell

Formed in 1337, the Royal Militia of the Island of Jersey can claim to be the oldest sub-unit of the British Army, although, because it is not a regiment, and was disbanded for decades in the late 20th century, it is not the most senior.

== History ==
A militia force was organised in accordance with the order on 24 July 1203 of King John to provide a "sufficiency of men and money to defend the Island from the enemy". In 1214 Eustace the Monk, a pirate, based in Sark arrived under orders from Philip II of France to harry the Channel Islands. In Guernsey Eustace met a newly raised and locally armed defence force comprising the whole manhood of the Island. This could be considered to be a militia. Jersey would almost certainly have made the same preparations.

In 1336, the exiled King David II of Scotland, from his base in France, raided the island of Jersey. The following year, in response to the threat of a repeat of this incursion, King Edward III ordered Thomas de Ferrers, Warden of the Isles, to levy and equip a militia of "all men capable of bearing arms, and to form them into companies of thousands, hundreds and twenties, and to lead them well-armed and arrayed for the defence of the islands". This created an organised, compulsory, and unpaid militia.

Jersey was invaded by French troops in 1461. They were supporters of the Lancastrian force during the Wars of the Roses, as was the Governor of Mont Orgueil, who had surrendered the castle to the French. The militia was not strong enough to retake the castle and instead controlled half of the island with their base in Grosnez Castle where they stayed until 1468 when the invaders were expelled by a Yorkist English army led by Richard Harliston, supported by the militia commanded by the Seigneur of Saint Ouen and after a siege of Mont Orgueil that lasted 19 weeks. The help given by the St Ouen militia earned them the honour to parade on the right flank of future militia parades.

In 1545, the Jersey Militia consisted of 12 parochial bands, many of which were called into action in 1549 when a force of French pirates, who had captured Sark as a base for their activities landed at Bouley Bay, advancing inland they met the militia who defeated them and driving them back down to the beach, killing up to a thousand in pursuit. In 1555 Parish Companies were ordered to practice every Sunday, weather permitting, firing arquebus, bow and arrow and crossbow.

=== 17th century ===
A review undertaken in 1617 showed over 3,000 men, although their arms were defective, with only 12 pikes between them, few muskets, and many were armed with just staves. In 1622 they were organized into three regiments, the North, West and East. The use of the title Colonel for the officer in charge of a regiment appears around 1620, prior to this the commander was called a Captain.

During the English Civil War, the militia had divided loyalties, initially in March 1643 marching on St. Helier to support the arrest of Philippe de Carteret (the Royalist Governor and Bailiff). However, by the end of the year, they rallied to the Royalist cause with the arrival of George Carteret on the Island. The Parliamentary supporters were imprisoned or forced to leave the island and having their property confiscated. In 1646 the future Charles II visited the island and when he returned in 1649, following the execution of his father in London, a ceremony was held in the Royal Square in Saint Helier on 17 February 1649 where Charles was publicly proclaimed king (following the first public proclamation in Edinburgh on 5 February 1649).

In October 1651 Oliver Cromwell sent a fleet of over 80 ships and military force to capture the island. The Parliamentary ships delayed landing for several days, moving from bay to bay, being followed by the 2,000 militia, until after three nights they started landing at St Ouen's Bay. Opposed by a troop of militia cavalry, the invaders suffered casualties, but the militia infantry were dispersed and tired after three days of marching and could not reinforce the landing point faster than the Parliamentarian troops were being landed from the ships. Outnumbered, the militia fell back, 340 retiring into Elizabeth Castle, where they had provisions for eight months, others to Mont Orgueil which was besieged first and following negotiations surrendered with 40 Royalists supporters, who wanted to continue the fight, being allowed to go to Elizabeth Castle, which was then put under siege and after a week, a lucky shot hit a powder store which exploded, killing six, and burying 40 under rubble. Charles wrote to the garrison to give them permission to surrender, although they held out until 12 December when, following negotiations, the defenders were permitted to travel to France with their money and possessions and the castle surrendered.

The militia was reorganized and uniformed in scarlet by the Governor of Jersey, Sir Thomas Morgan, in 1678, and in 1685 a Troop of Horse was raised (which later became Dragoons).

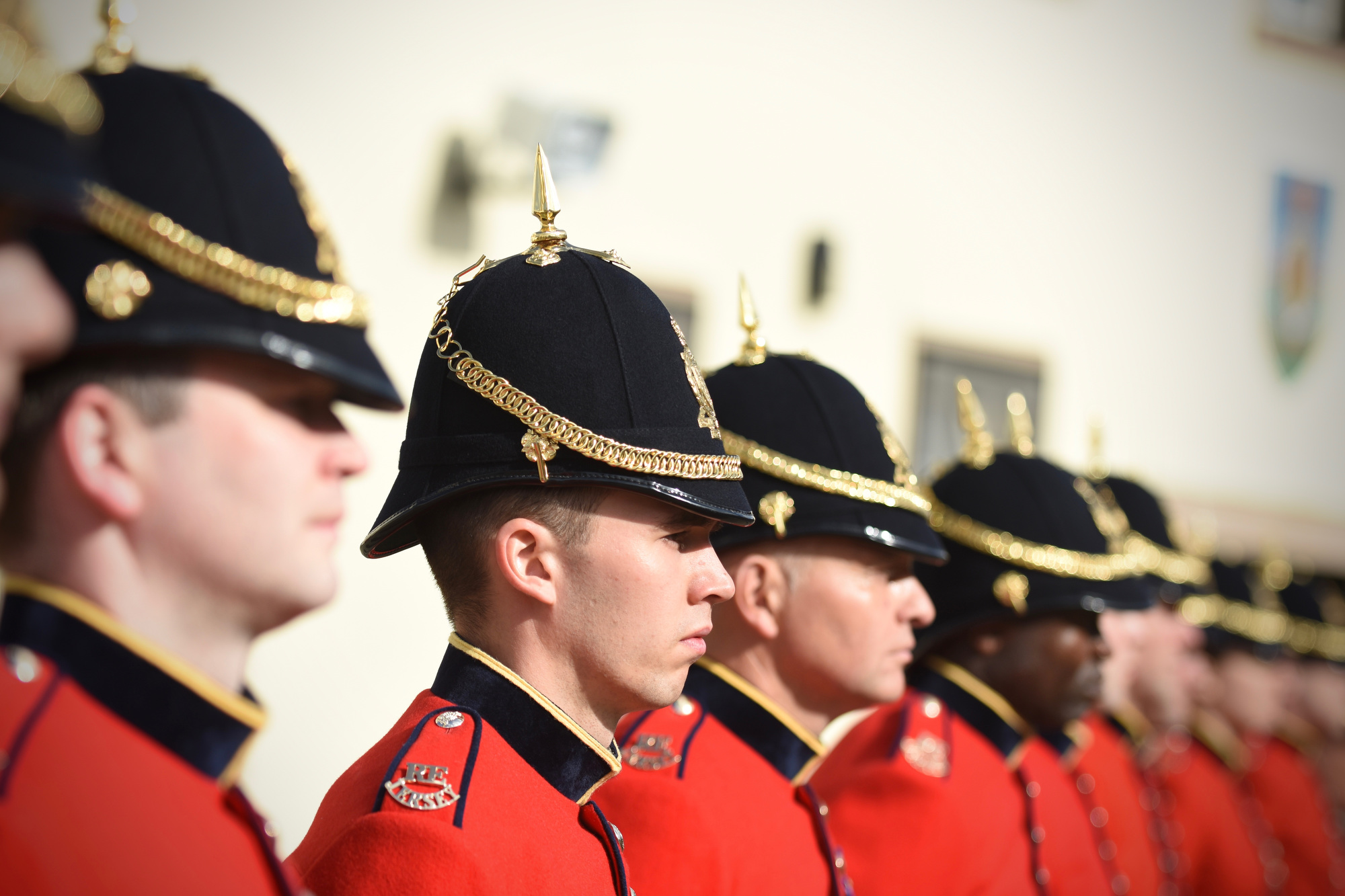
Members of the JFS RE(M) wearing traditional full dress uniform

=== 18th Century ===
Around 1730, the militia was divided into five regiments, based on the Parishes of the island, the 4th Regiment (that of the parishes of Saint Lawrence and Saint Helier) consisting of two battalions. Compulsory military service was introduced in 1771 and the militia was increased to a Regiment of Cavalry, a Regiment of Artillery and five Regiments of Infantry.

On 1 May 1779, a Franco-Dutch force attempted a landing at St Ouen's Bay. Early that morning lookouts sighted five large vessels and a great number of boats some three leagues off the coast, proceeding towards the coast in order by a coup de main to effect a landing. Guns on the cutters and small craft supporting the landing fired grapeshot at the defenders on the coast. The defenders, the 78th Regiment of Foot and the Jersey Militia, together with some field artillery force marched to St Ouens bay, the proposed landing beach, the artillery was dragged through the sand of the beaches, arriving in time to oppose the landing. The defenders were able to prevent the landing, suffering only a few men wounded when a cannon burst. The enemy fleet moved to St. Brelade's bay, only to see more defenders ready for them. The proposed invasion was abandoned.

The invasion was attempted again but the protecting fleet was intercepted and nearly annihilated. A third attempt managed to get most men ashore undetected on the night of 5 January 1781. Several ships were wrecked losing around 200 men. Marching to St. Helier, the French arrived before dawn, taking the Governor prisoner. Messages were sent to alert the Island Regiments and the Militia who mustered outside the town. The Militia, displaying enthusiastic loyalty, fought alongside Regiments of the regular British Army at the Battle of Jersey, when together they defeated an attempted French invasion (intended to remove the threat the island posed to American shipping in the American Revolutionary War). 50 regulars and 30 militia were casualties, very few of the French force escaped.

On 28 May 1778 the Governor of Jersey, Field Marshal Henry Seymour Conway, submitted plans to Lord Weymouth for the construction of 30 coastal towers to forestall, or at least impede French incursions on the island. King George III granted approval and funding on 5 July 1778. To be manned by the militia and known as Conway's towers, 23 were eventually built.

Discontent amongst Methodist militia troopers during the 1780s and 1790s about having to parade on a Sunday was eventually listened to, with the Privy Council agreeing to allow Methodists to drill on weekdays.

=== 19th Century ===
Three Martello towers were built, 1808 Portlet, 1811 Icho, La Tour de Vinde was completed in 1814 they were built to aid defence of possible landing places.

In 1831, the Militia was designated the Royal Jersey Militia on the 50th anniversary of this battle. The facings on uniforms were changed from buff to blue. In 1837 there were five regiments, formed into six battalions, each with a company of artillery. Every resident from 19 to 65 bears arms with 16- to 18-year-olds being trained weekly. The whole militia is unpaid. The regiments were re-organized on several occasions between 1870, when the Troop of Dragoons was disbanded, and the end of the century.

Four more Martello towers were built 1835 Lewis, 1834 Kempt, 1837 Victoria and La Collette to further improve Island defences.

In 1844 Arsenals were built in each parish, which enabled the artillery to be relocated from the parish churches.

In 1881 under General Order No 130, the 1st (West), 2nd (East) and 3rd (South) Regiments were permitted the honour of ‘Jersey 1781'

A minor mutiny occurred in 1891 at a parade when men in the West Regiment objected to where they were to stand, calling out "N'Bouogi Pas!". A small number of the ringleaders were found guilty, spent a few days in the prison and were then treated to a meal out in the town by their comrades.

=== 20th Century ===
In 1905 the militia came under the Army Act and was reorganised to create a regiment of artillery comprising two field and two garrison companies. An engineer company, a medical company and three battalions of infantry.

In 1915, one company was detached to the 7th (Service) Battalion, the Royal Irish Rifles. The militia remained in Jersey throughout the war although many of the men went to serve in British Regiments, 6,292 Jerseymen serving in total, with 862 being killed. In 1917, the 7th Battalion was disbanded and its personnel transferred to 2nd Battalion, The Hampshire Regiment. Other members of the Regiment served as guards at the Blanches Banques Prisoner of War Camp located at St Brélade.

The Militia was reconstituted in 1921 as one infantry battalion, the Royal Militia of the Island of Jersey.

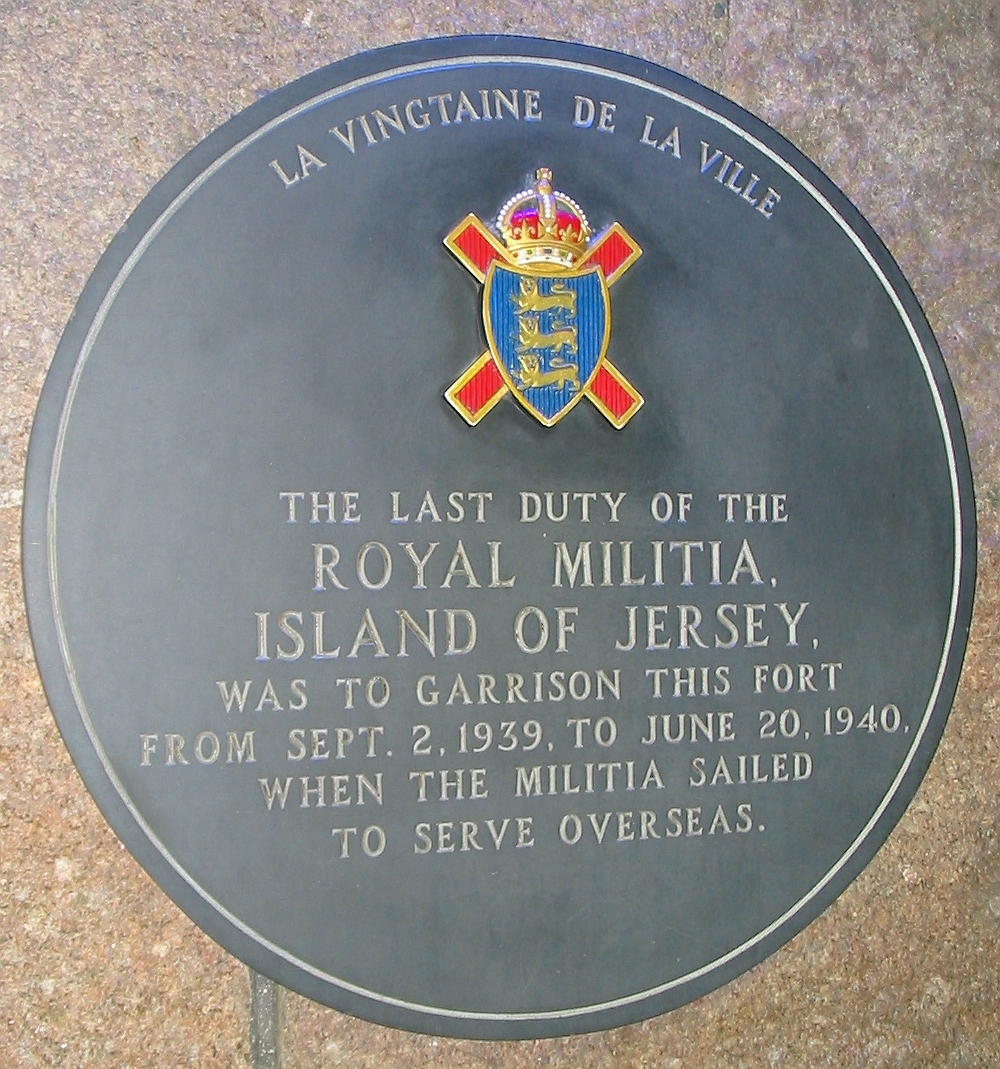
Plaque, Fort Regent

In World War II, the Island was demilitarised, 11 officers and 193 men of the militia left on the SS Hodder to England, where they formed the nucleus of the 11th (Royal Militia Island of Jersey) Battalion, The Hampshire Regiment. It was a training battalion, based in the United Kingdom throughout the war until it was disbanded in 1946. Because the National Service Act did not apply in the Channel Islands, the Royal Militia of the Island of Jersey went into suspended animation (sc. it existed on paper, but had no personnel) until it was formally disbanded, along with the other British Militia regiments, in 1953.

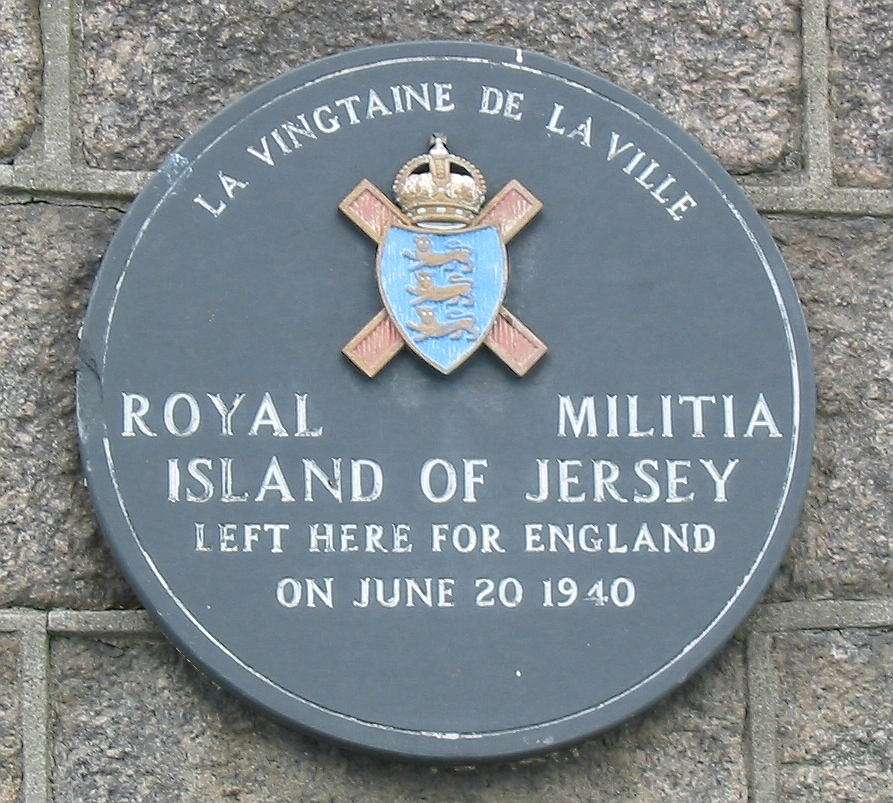
Plaque, Saint Helier Harbour

=== Modern ===
In 1987, it was re-formed as a Territorial Army regiment, the Jersey Field Squadron (The Royal Militia Island of Jersey), 111 Regiment, Royal Engineers, later 73 Regiment, Royal Engineers. 14 April 2007, it came under the operational command of the Royal Monmouthshire Royal Engineers.

== Battle honours ==
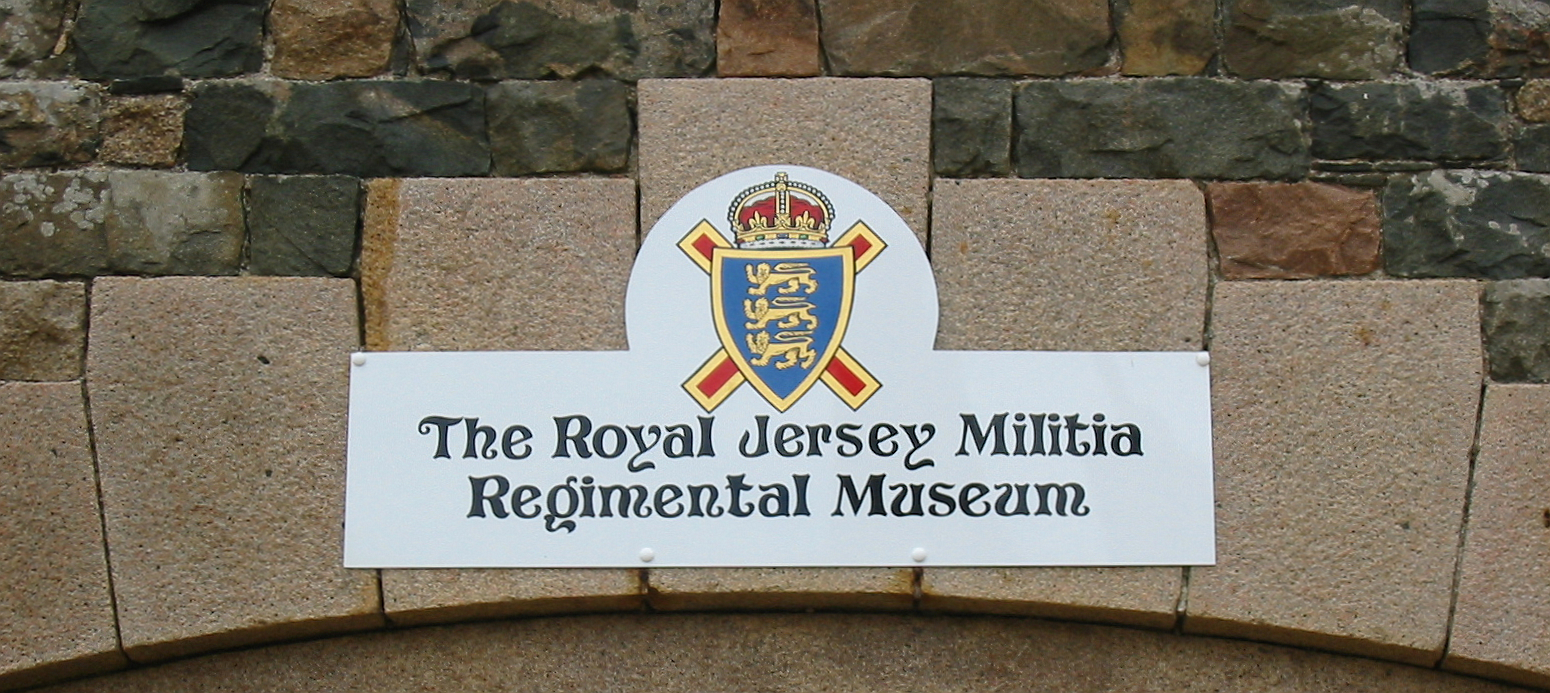
Regimental Museum

The regiment was awarded the following battle honours.

- Jersey 1781
- The Great War 1914–1918

Both these honours are unique to the regiment.

== See also ==
- Royal Guernsey Light Infantry
- Royal Guernsey Militia
