= Battle of Jersey =

1781 battle of the American War of Independence

- Part of the American War of Independence
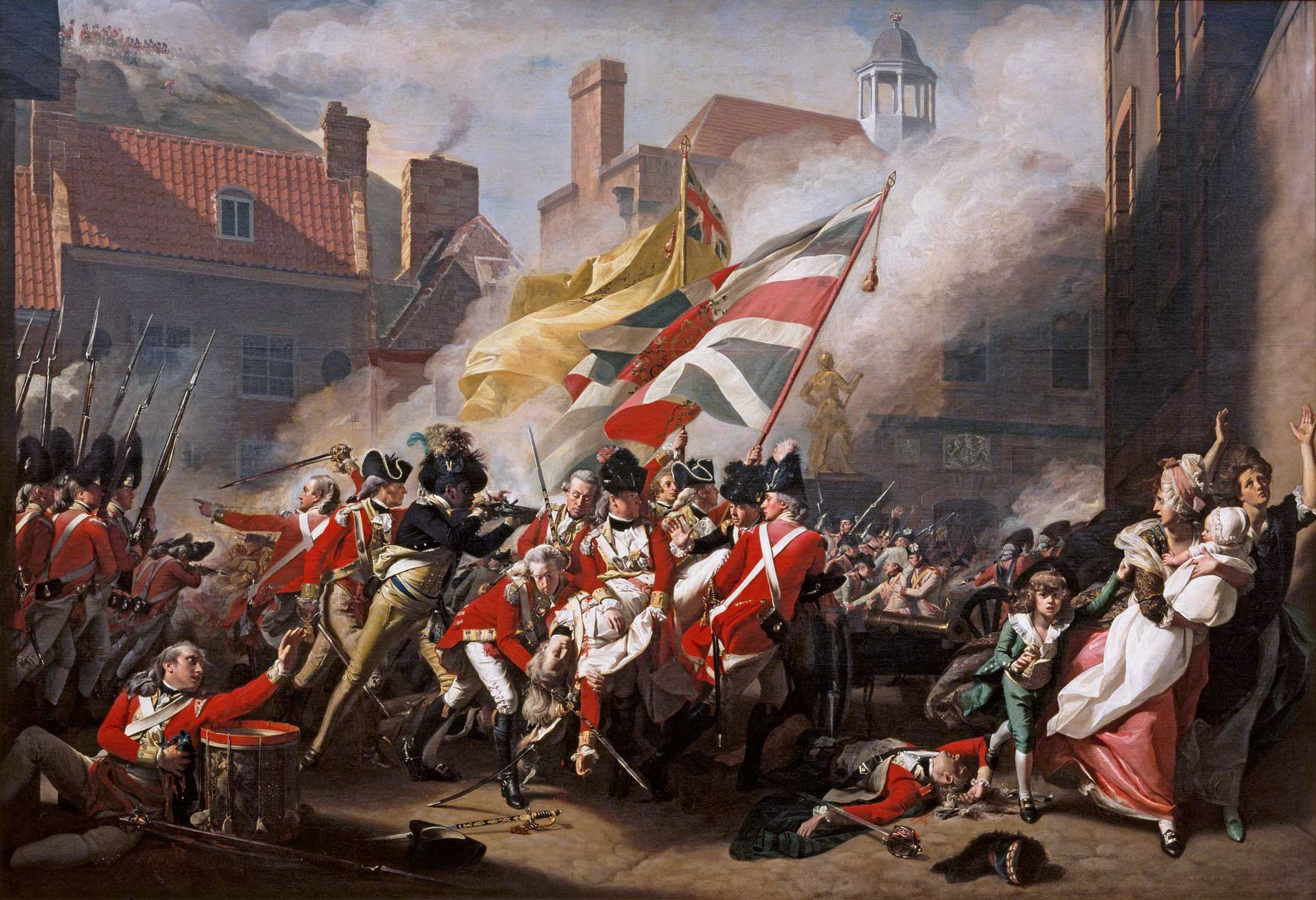
- The Death of Major Peirson, 6 January 1781; John Singleton Copley, 1783
Date	6 January 1781
Location	Saint Helier, Jersey 49.18238°N 2.10749°W
Result	British victory

Belligerents
Great Britain	France

Commanders and leaders
Francis Peirson †	Philippe Rullecourt †

Strength
2,000	1,400

Casualties and losses
Losses: 81; 15 killed; 66 wounded	Losses: 752; 78 killed; 74 wounded; 600 captured

The Battle of Jersey took place on 6 January 1781 during the American War of Independence when French forces unsuccessfully invaded the British-ruled island of Jersey to remove the threat it posed to French and American shipping. Jersey provided a base for British privateers. The French expedition was defeated, losing nearly half its force, including its commander, Baron Philippe de Rullecourt, who died of wounds sustained in the fighting. The battle is often remembered for the death of the British commander, Major Francis Peirson, and a painting based on his final moments by John Singleton Copley.

== Background ==
Only 14 miles (23 km) off the coast of France, the Channel Islands, including Jersey, were a location of strategic importance during any war between Britain and France. Large numbers of privateers operated out of the islands, causing chaos amongst French merchant shipping. Jersey privateers even operated off the coast of America.

The French government decided to neutralise this threat. Furthermore, at the time, Gibraltar was in the midst of the Great Siege: contemporary British newspapers reported that the attack on Jersey was an attempt to distract British attention from Gibraltar and divert military resources away from the siege.

=== Defences in Jersey ===
Aware of the military importance of Jersey, the British government had ordered that the island be heavily fortified. On 28 May 1778 the Governor of Jersey, Field Marshal Henry Seymour Conway, submitted plans to Lord Weymouth for the construction of 30 round towers to forestall, or at least impede French incursions on the island. King George III granted approval and funding on 5 July 1778. Perhaps four towers had been completed by the time of the Battle of Jersey, none where the French would land. Gun batteries, forts and redoubts already existed around the coast, and were being improved and rearmed. All adult males had for centuries been required by law to serve in the Jersey Militia which in 1780 comprised some 3,000 men in five regiments, including artillery and dragoons.

British troops included:

- 71st (Highland) Regiment of Foot (Fraser's Highlanders)
- 78th (Highland) Regiment of Foot (Seaforth Highland)
- 83rd Regiment of Foot (Royal Glasgow Volunteers)
- 95th Regiment of Foot (Reid's)
- 1st (Northwest) Regiment of Jersey Militia
- 3rd (East) Regiment of Jersey Militia
- 6th (South West) Regiment of Jersey Militia
- 700 "Invalids" (semi-retired reservists)

A total force amounting to about 6,250 troops of all types was available on Jersey. A naval force, the "Jersey Squadron", was also based in the island, but was on a cruise against the Dutch at the time of the invasion.

=== Previous Failed French attack (1779) ===
On 1 May 1779, during the Anglo-French War (1778–1783) a French force under the command of the French born Prince of Nassau-Siegen attempted a landing at St Ouen's Bay. Early that morning lookouts sighted five large vessels and a great number of boats some three leagues off the coast, proceeding towards the coast to effect a landing. Guns on the cutters and small craft supporting the landing fired grapeshot at the defenders on the coast.

The defenders, the half regiment of 78th Seaforth Highlanders and Jersey militia, together with some field artillery that they dragged through the sand of the beaches, had by fast marching arrived in time to oppose the landing. The defenders were able to prevent the landing, suffering only a few men wounded when a cannon burst. The French vessels withdrew, first holding off a league from the coast before leaving the area entirely.

=== French plan ===
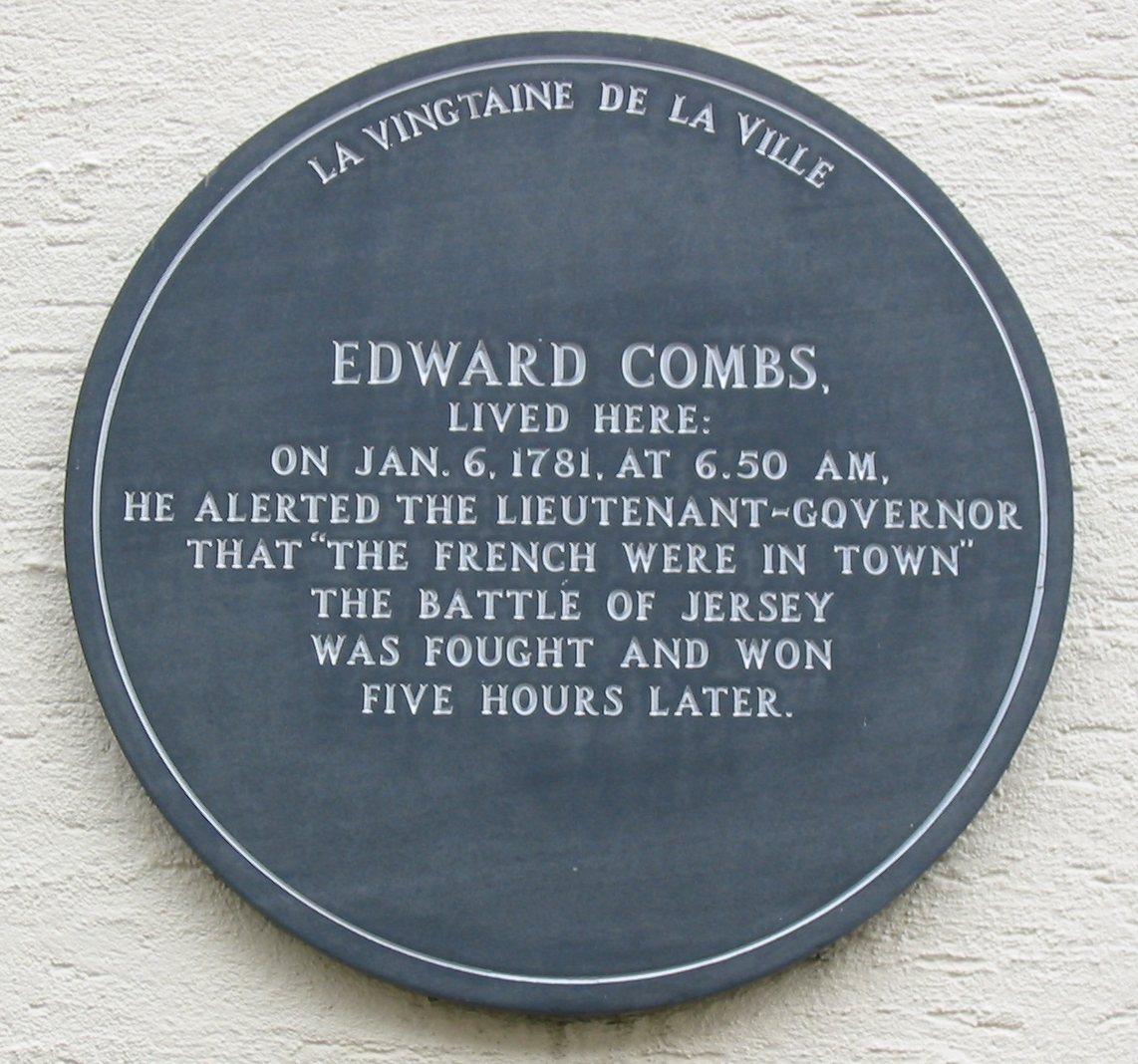
A plaque in Saint Helier marks the house of Edward Combs who raised the alarm

Despite the misgivings of the French military, who believed that an attack on Jersey would be a futile waste of resources, with any success being short-lived, the government approved a plan put forward by Baron Philippe de Rullecourt, who had accompanied the Prince of Nassau-Siegen in 1779. De Rullecourt was an adventurer and a colonel in the French Army. King Louis XVI had promised de Rullecourt the rank of general and the Cordon rouge as soon as he had control of the town of Saint Helier, the island's capital.

The second commander was an Indian prince named Mir Sayyad, who had been an ally of France in the Seven Years' War and moved to Paris upon the war's conclusion. Sayyad participated in the invasion and advised Rullecourt to sack the town and massacre all the inhabitants. One British officer wrote of him: "If our fate has depended on him, it would not have been of the most pleasant; he advised the French General (Rullecourt) to ransack everything and to put the town to fire and to blood." Rullecourt ignored Sayyad's advice.

Officially the expedition was a private affair. However, funding, equipment, transport and troops were provided by the French government. In order to conceal their involvement, the government went so far as to order the 'desertion' of several hundred regular troops to De Rullecourt's forces.

On 5 January 1781 the expedition set out from Granville, consisting of some 2,000 soldiers in four divisions. There was a storm which scattered some ships and only 1,200 initially made it to Jersey. Jersey still celebrated 6 January as 'Old Christmas Night', and the French landed undetected. The 800 men of the first division landed at La Rocque, Grouville, on the south east coast and passed close by the guards without being noticed. A French officer even said that he had slept beneath the guards, but that the guards had not heard the French. The guards were subsequently put on trial, where it was found they had abandoned their post to go drinking.

The French first division stayed there most of the night. The 400 men of the French second division landed amongst rocks and were entirely lost. The initial British report was that a privateer and four transport vessels had been lost, together with "upwards of 200 men".

The boats that contained the third division, consisting of 600 men, separated from the rest of the fleet and were unable to join it. The fourth division, consisting of 200 men, landed early in the next morning at La Rocque. The total of the French troops landed on the island was therefore about 1,400.

== Prelude ==
=== French troops land and enter Saint Helier ===
Landing during the night of 5/6 January, a French force of 700 men under the Baron de Rollecourt marched the four kilometers to St Helier, arriving between six and seven in the morning on 6 January. When they entered the market, later to be called the Royal Square, with its recently erected statue to King George II, they killed a sentry and surprised the guard. The first division set up defensive positions in the market while most of the town was asleep. At about eight o'clock a French patrol surrounded Government House, then situated at Le Manoir de La Motte on the east of the town; there they surprised the island's governor, Major Moses Corbet, in bed.

His captors took Corbet to the Royal Court House in the market square where De Rullecourt convinced Corbet that thousands of French troops had already overwhelmed Jersey. De Rullecourt threatened to burn the town and slaughter the inhabitants if Corbet did not sign a capitulation. In addition, Corbet was to order the commander at Elizabeth Castle to surrender. Corbet replied that as he was a prisoner he had no authority and that anything he signed would "be of no avail". De Rullecourt insisted and so Corbet, to avoid further harm to St Helier, signed.

The French had already approached the commander at Elizabeth Castle, Captain Mulcaster C.R.E., who refused their verbal request to surrender. The French had advanced towards the castle where the troops in the castle peremptorily fired on the French, killing two or three men; the French then withdrew. Captain Aylward of the Invalids then arrived at the Castle and, being senior, assumed command. When the French delivered Corbet's written order to surrender, the castle's defenders signalled their persistent refusal by opening fire on the French.

=== British preparations ===
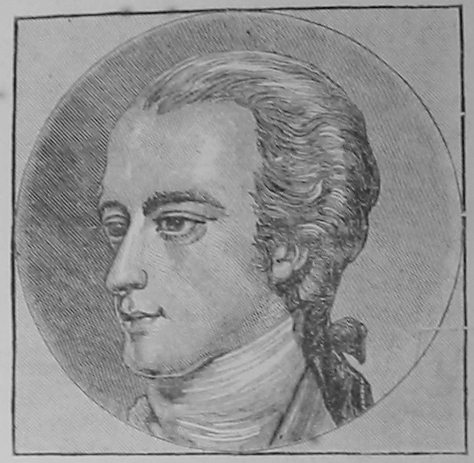
Major Peirson

The British were now alerted; with Corbet a prisoner, command passed to the next most senior British commander, the 24-year-old Major Francis Peirson, who commanded the troops at Saint Peter's Barracks. The British troops and militia assembled on the Mont ès Pendus (now called Westmount) to the west of the town. Peirson soon had 2,000 men at his disposal, with which he resolved to descend the hill and attack into the town. The French, who were camped in the market, had seized the town's cannons and had placed them at the different openings to the market to fire on the British troops if they approached. The French did not fire the howitzers. The British learned through several people who had been observing the French troops that they did not exceed 800 or 900 men.

Major Peirson detached the 78th Seaforth Highlanders under Captain Lumsdaine and sent them to take possession of the Mont de la Ville hill (now the site of Fort Regent) to block any French retreat. Once Peirson believed that the 78th had reached their destination, he ordered his remaining troops to attack. The British were stopped at the edge of the town, where de Rullecourt sent Corbet to tell the British that if they did not capitulate, the French would ransack the town within half an hour. Peirson and Captain Campbell answered that the French had 20 minutes to surrender.

The five companies of the 83rd Regiment of Foot and the part of the East Regiment in Grouville to the east who were now covering the landing area, also refused to surrender. When de Rullecourt received their answer he was heard to remark: "Since they do not want to surrender, I have come to die."

== Battle ==
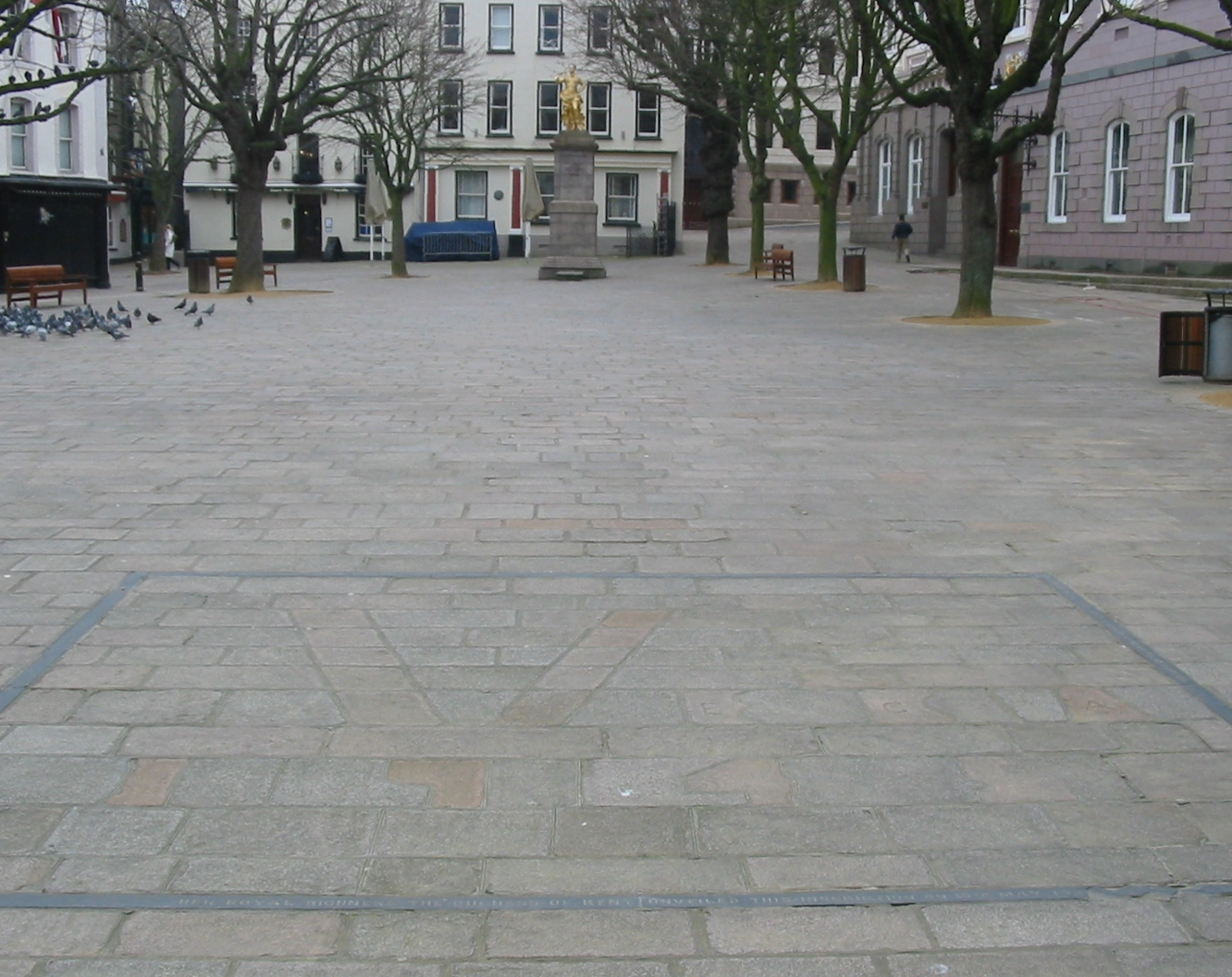
The Royal Square, as seen here today, was the scene of the Battle of Jersey.

The attack began. The British forces in the Grande Rue, now called Broad Street, included the 78th Regiment, the Battalion of Saint Lawrence, the South-East Regiment, and the Compagnies de Saint-Jean. The 95th Regiment of Foot, with the rest of the militia, advanced down the other avenues. The British had too many troops for the battle, a British soldier later saying that a third of the British troops would have been more than enough to destroy the French army. Many British soldiers, confused and having nothing to shoot at, fired most of their shots into the air.

The French resistance was short, most of the action lasting a quarter of an hour. The French only fired the cannons that they had at their disposal once or twice. The British had a howitzer placed directly opposite the market in the Grande Rue, which at each shot "cleaned all the surroundings of French" according to a member of the British service.

Major Peirson and the 95th Regiment advanced towards the Avenue du Marché. Then, when the British were prevailing, a musket ball in the heart killed Major Peirson; his saddened troops, now led by a militia subaltern, Philip Dumaresq, rushed forward and continued the fight. When de Rullecourt fell wounded, many French soldiers gave up the fight, throwing down their weapons and fleeing. Others reached the market houses from where they continued to fire.

De Rullecourt, through Corbet, told the British that the French had two battalions and an artillery company at La Rocque, which could be at the town within a quarter of an hour. The British were not intimidated, knowing that less than 200 French troops had landed that morning. A guard of 45 grenadiers of the 83rd Regiment, led by Captain Campbell, resisted 140 French soldiers until the arrival of a part of the East Regiment, whereupon the French were defeated, suffering 30 dead or wounded, with 70 men taken prisoner. Seven grenadiers were killed during this action. The remaining French soldiers dispersed throughout the countryside to try to reach their boats; local people captured several of them.

=== Conclusion ===
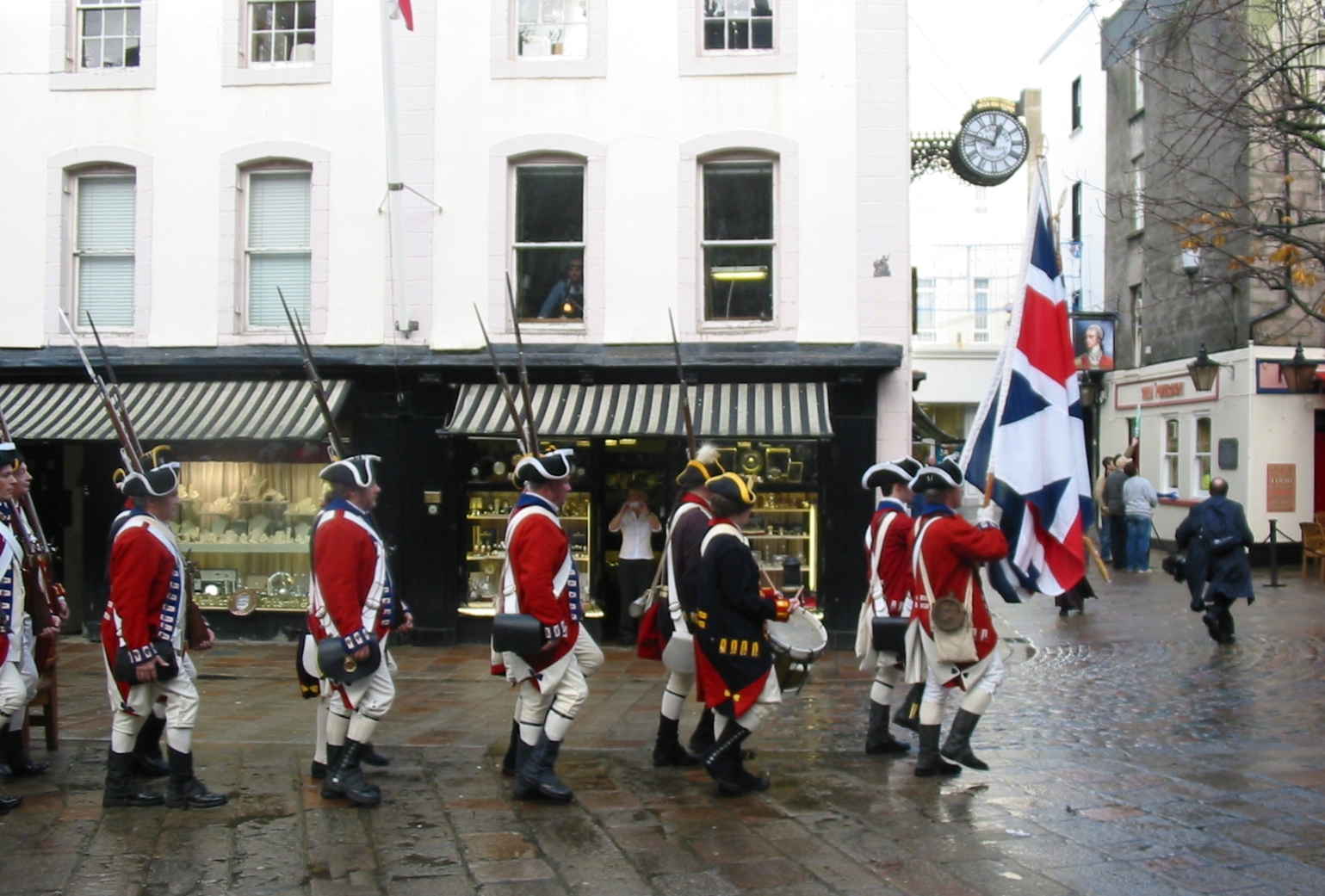
Historical re-enactment soldiers of 1781 Jersey Militia marching in the Royal Square, St. Helier, site of the Battle of Jersey, during ceremonies marking the anniversary of battle on 6 January 2007. At right, the house of Dr Lerrier where Baron de Rullecourt died (now the pub called The Peirson).

The British took 600 prisoners in all, whom they subsequently sent to England. The British losses were 11 dead and 36 wounded among the regular troops, and four dead and 29 wounded among the militia. In addition, Captain Charlton, of the Royal Artillery, was wounded while a prisoner of the French. The French had 78 killed and 74 wounded. De Rullecourt was seriously wounded, and died that night at the house of Dr Lerrier in Royal Square (now the pub called The Peirson); he was buried in the grounds of the Parish Church of St Helier.

Captain Mulcaster stated: "The face of the affairs being in a few hours thus changed, the enemy's vessels quit the Island, the troops that they had landed being drowned, killed, wounded or prisoners."

== Aftermath ==
Major Peirson was also buried in the Parish Church of St Helier, where a marble monument was erected by the people of Jersey in his memory.

It became notorious that there were traitors among the British. De Rullecourt possessed a plan of the fortifications, the towers, the cannons and so on, saying that without good friends in Jersey, he would not have come. The French knew the exact number of British troops and militia, the names of the officers commanding them, and more. In the papers found in the General's trunk was the name of one Mr. Le Geyt, a Jerseyman who was later seized, as was another suspect.

Lieutenant-Governor Major Moses Corbet was arrested and was subsequently tried between 1 and 5 May by courts-martial at Horse Guards. The charges against him related to his command of the army troops, in the absence of the Governor of Jersey, surprised and captured and contrary to his duty did take upon himself and agree to sign articles of capitulation and later did verbally induce others to capitulate. Admitting to being captured and signing the capitulation document, the outcome was inconclusive; he was dismissed as Lieutenant-Governor, but granted a pension of £250 p.a. for life.

Conway had proposed the construction of 30 coastal towers in 1778, and four had been completed by the time of the battle, however they played no part in defending the island. Between 1781 and 1814, the government built nineteen more of Conway's round towers and three Martello towers to improve the island's defences.
