= Francis Peirson =

British Army officer (1757–1781)

- Born: January 1757; London, England
- Died: 6 January 1781 (age 24); Jersey
- Military career
- Allegiance: Kingdom of Great Britain
- Branch: British Army
- Service years: 1772 - 1781
- Rank: Major
- Commands: (acting garrison commander) Jersey Garrison
- Conflicts: American War of Independence; Battle of Jersey †

Major Francis Peirson (January 1757 – 6 January 1781) was a British Army officer who was serving on Jersey, in the Channel Islands off the coast of France. He was killed in the Battle of Jersey, one of the last battles to take place in the British Isles.

== Early life ==
Francis Peirson was born in January 1757, in Lowthorpe, Yorkshire. He was the eldest child of Francis Peirson Esq., and had only sisters. Educated at Warrington Academy, Peirson joined the British Army in 1772. In 1779 he was appointed to the 95th Regiment of Foot, a fencible regiment raised for the defence of the British Isles from invasion and was deployed with the regiment to Jersey the following year. He was promoted to major in 1780.

== Battle of Jersey and Death ==
Following the capture and imprisonment of Major Moses Corbet, Commander of the Jersey Garrison, by French troops on 6 January 1781, Peirson refused French demands to surrender and took command of the Garrison. Peirson's refusal to surrender was contrary to the order of the imprisoned Corbet who had already signed the garrison's official capitulation under the threat that St Helier, island's town, would be burnt to the ground. Peirson, then aged 24, energetically rallied the garrison from its various posts on the island, first dispatching Captain Hugh Fraser, commander of the Highlanders and light company, to secure the heights overlooking the town, which the French had inexplicably left unoccupied. Peirson then organised a counterattack against the main French force occupying St Helier, planning to outflank the De Rullecourt's troops by attacking the town from two directions. Many of the British soldiers were veterans of fighting in North America and the outnumbered French were driven back to the centre of the town at bayonet point.

=== Death ===
The ensuing exchange of fire felled the two opposing commanders. Peirson was shot in the heart by a musket ball whilst leading a flanking manoeuvre around the French position, De Rullecourt the French commander was killed whilst attempting to organise a last stand around the Statue of King George II. Peirson died near the house of Phillipe Lerrier, which to this day supposedly bears the marks left by the shots that killed him. Adjutant Harrison, remenisced about Peirson's final moments in a letter to Francis Peirson's father:

"... My dear Major headed the 95th in the most gallant manner I was with him the whole Time and just before the French surrendered my brave commander received a Bull in his Breast which went through his heart. He fell with his head against me. I took him out of the ac- tion and with assistance carried him to the Town, and got the survey- or general to him but all in vain he died in my arms without speaking a word. I should have died happy if he had spoke one single word to me - he is to be interred this day at two o'clock."

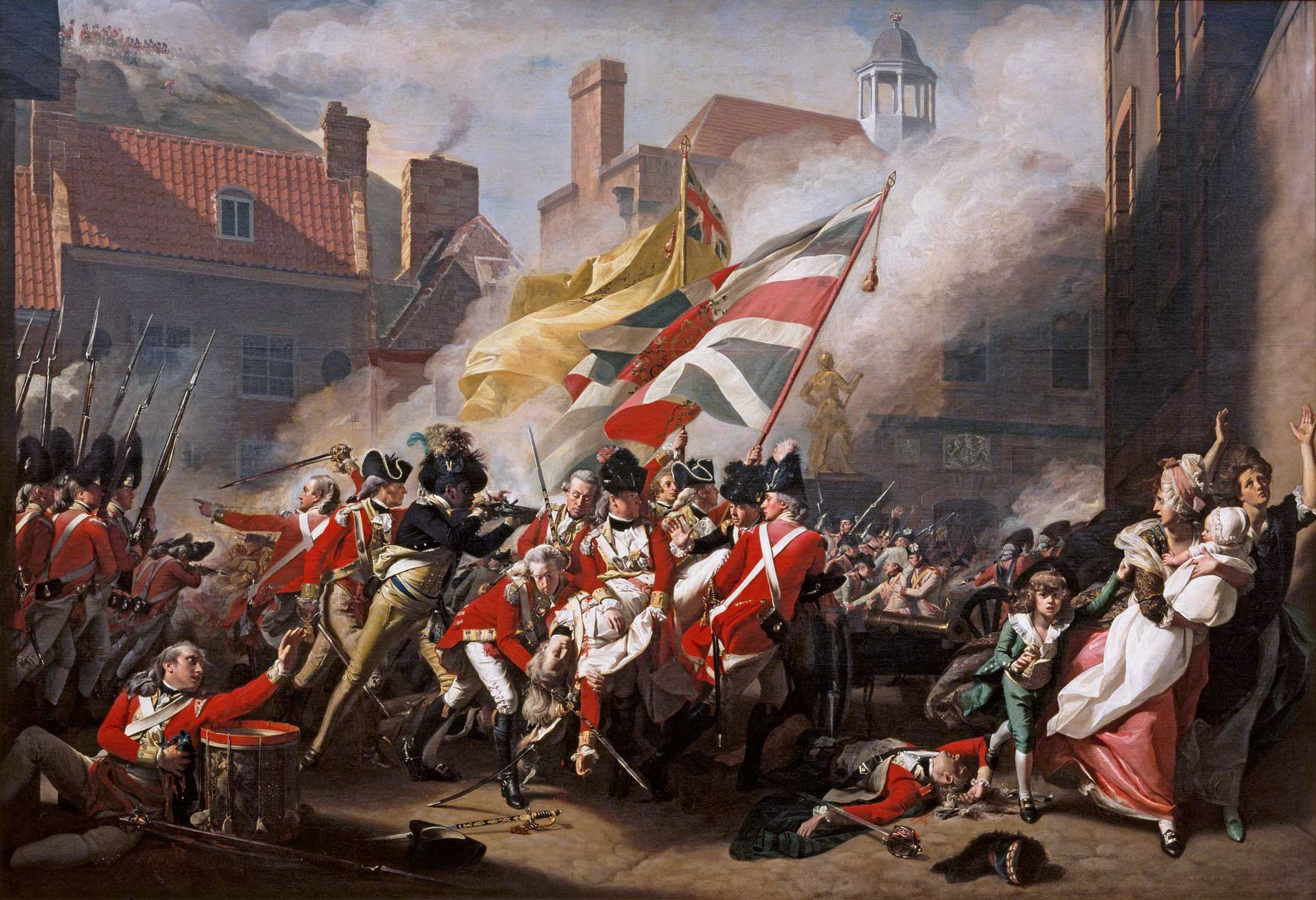
The Death of Major Peirson in the Battle of Jersey, painted by John Singleton Copley.

After Peirson's death, the defeated French force fled from the town and dispersed into the countryside, where most were eventually captured. As the engagement in St Helier was being fought, Grenadiers from the 83rd Regiment under the command of Captain Campbell stormed and recaptured the La Platte Rocque Battery which had been occupied by 100 French troops. After the battle, Peirson's body was interred in the Church of St. Helier.

== Legacy ==
In Britain, Peirson's death came during a period when Britain had few victories, and as a result, his demise was hailed as a heroic sacrifice for a British victory. In April 1781, The Isle of Jersey decided to commission a memorial to Pierson, and in August, English artist John Bacon received the commission.

Peirson is best remembered however, in the history painting The Death of Major Pierson by John Singleton Copley. His appearance in this portrait led to a cult of personality, similar to that of General Wolfe. The London Magazine printed the following about his death:

"Major Peirson, who commanded the troops, was un- fortunately killed in the moment of victory. The loss of this young officer, whose military abilities, which were so remarkable upon this occasion, held out the highest expectations of his country is most sincerely lamented by every officer and soldier both of the reg- ulars and the militia, as well as by every inhabitant of the Island...."

The following is a list of places named for Peirson:

- The Peirson pub is where Philippe de Rullecourt, the opposing French General, died.
- Peirson Place is the short street leading into the Royal Square where Peirson was shot
- Peirson Road is another street in Saint Helier

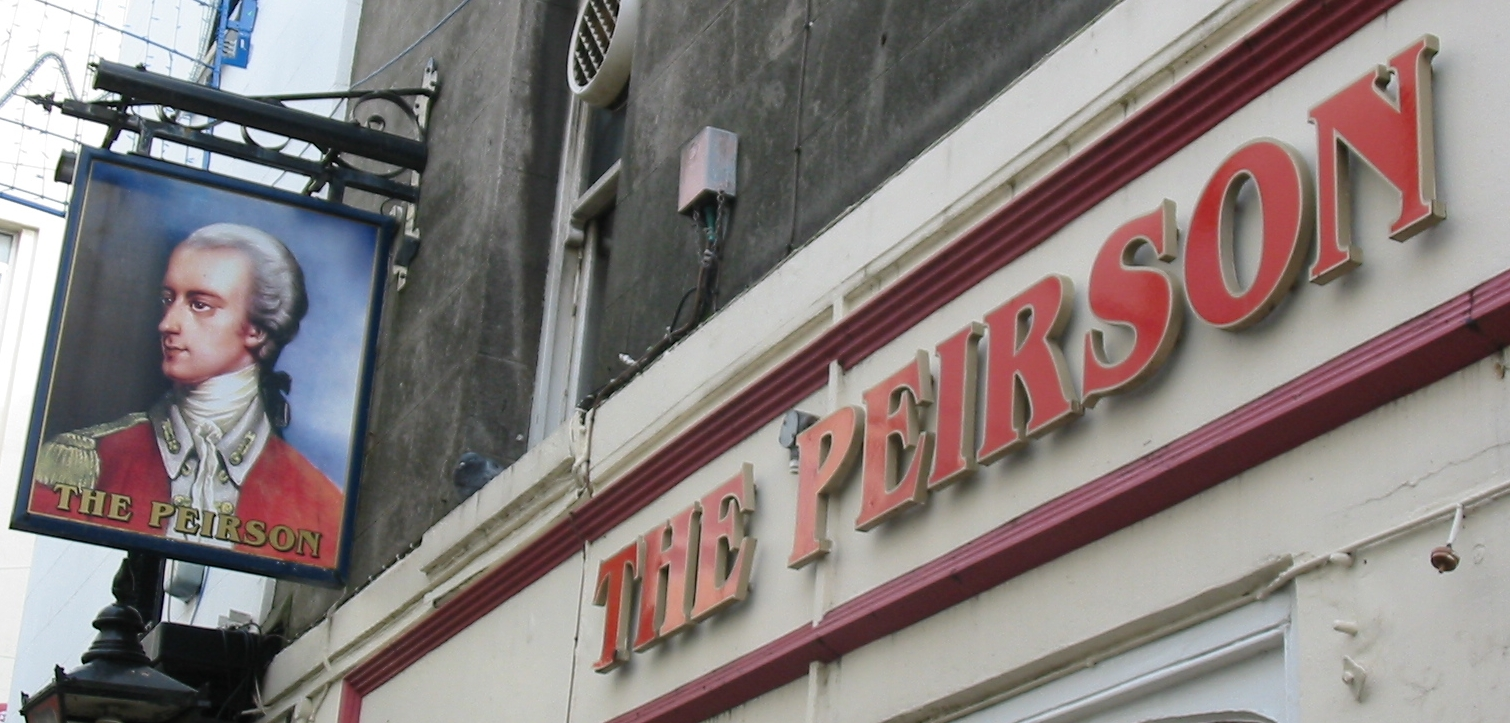
The Peirson pub

Government offices
Preceded by Moses Corbet	Lieutenant Governor of Jersey; 6 January 1781 (for one day)	Succeeded by Vacant
