= Lewis Tower, Jersey =

Coordinates: 49.2298°N 2.2346°W

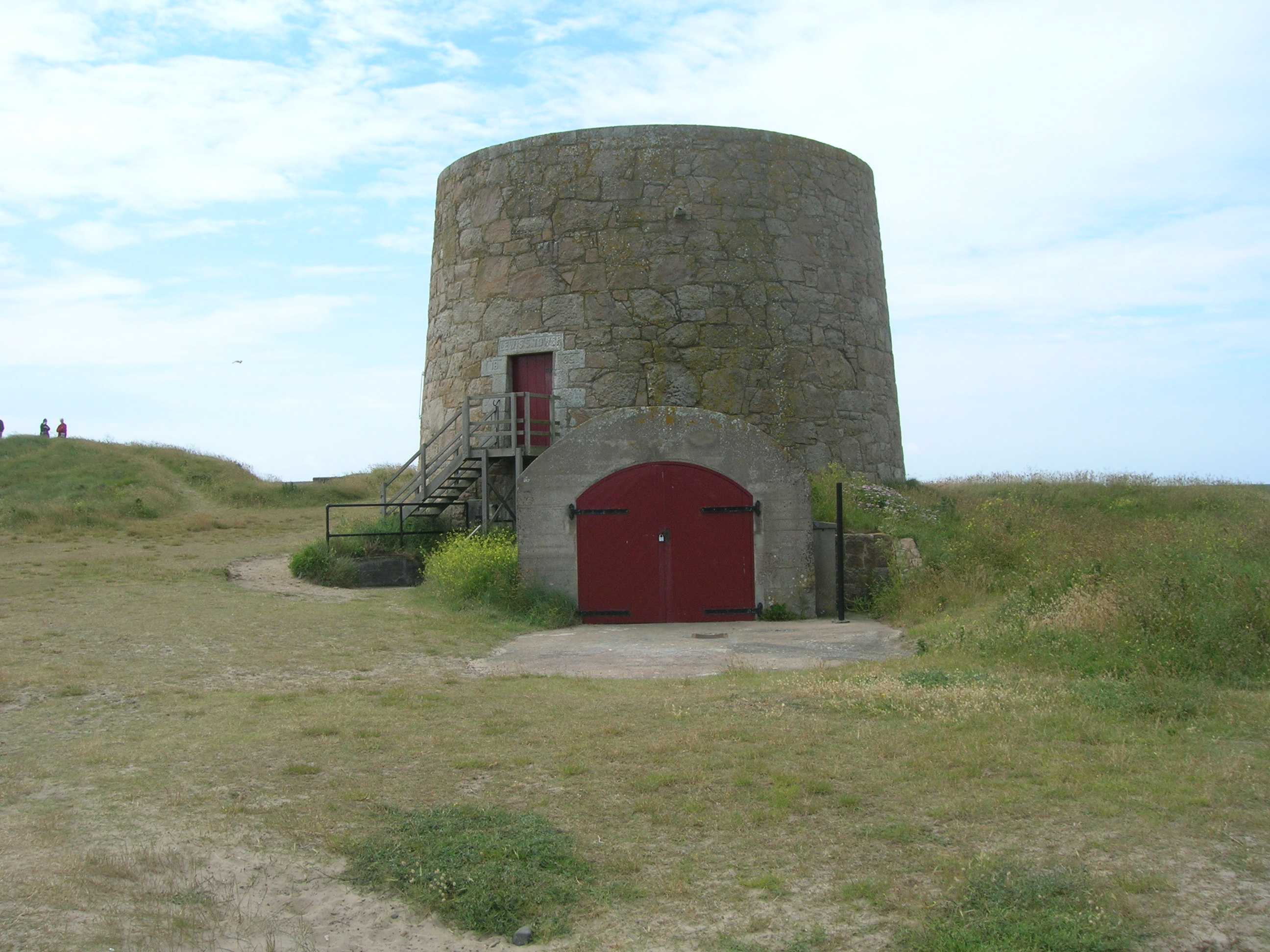
Lewis Tower, Jersey

Lewis Tower (also known as Lewis's Tower) is a Martello tower in St Ouen's Bay on the island of Jersey. It was erected by the British in 1835, and is named after Colonel Griffith Lewis, who commanded the Royal Engineers in Jersey from December 1830 to January 1836.

== History ==
The location was of some military significance. On 1 May 1779, the Rector of St Ouen, le Sire du Parcq, brought the parish field guns to a favourable spot to help repulse the Franco-Dutch Invasion of Jersey. In 1787 the British placed a battery of three 24-pounder guns on the spot. In 1835, the Martello tower was built there.

Lewis Tower has an elliptical footprint, with the tower's wall being thicker on the seaward side. It has three levels with a central pillar and a circular spiral staircase between the floors. It is 33 feet in height and has a diameter of 39 feet. It was armed with a single 24-pounder gun. It is thus smaller and more lightly armed than the nearby Kempt Tower. Four years after Lewis Tower's completion, it received a coat of stucco or cement to reduce the damp.

During the German occupation of the Channel Islands, the Germans built a large bunker next to Lewis Tower. The bunker today houses the Channel Islands Military Museum. The Germans also built a concrete extension at the tower's base that housed a searchlight.

Today, the tower is available as self-catering accommodation under a programme that Jersey Heritage administers for the States of Jersey Towers and Forts project.
