= Mir Sayyad =

Mir Sayyad, or Prince Emire, was an Indian general in the service of France who fought in Battle of Jersey, 1781.

The South Indian fighting dagger that was used by Mir Sayyad during the Battle of Jersey, 1781.

After his domain was annexed by the East India Company, he left India and entered the service of the Kingdom of France. He advised Philippe de Rullecourt, the French commander at the Battle of Jersey, to ransack the city and massacre the townspeople. However, the invasion was a complete failure.
