= Moses Corbet =

British Army officer (1728–1814)

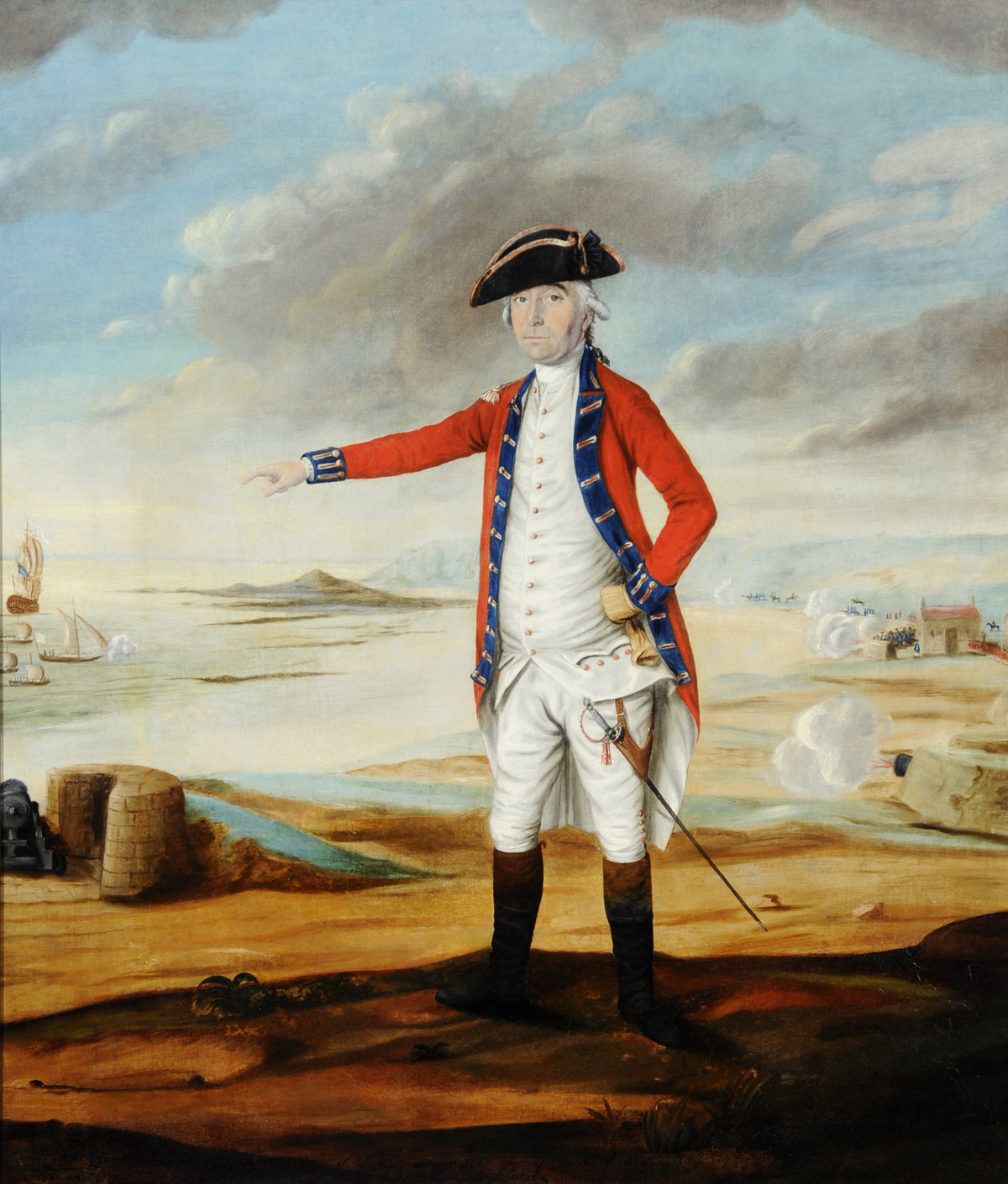
- Portrait by Philip Jean, c. 1779
- Born: 1728
- Died: 1814 (aged 85–86)
- Military career
- Allegiance: Great Britain
- Branch: British Army
- Service years: c. 1745–c. 1780
- Rank: Major
- Unit: 7th Regiment of Foot
- Commands: Garrison of Jersey
- Conflicts: American War of Independence; Invasion of Jersey (1779); Battle of Jersey

Major Moses Corbet (1728 – 1814) was a British Army officer who served as the lieutenant governor of Jersey from 1771 to 1781.

== Early career ==
Moses Corbet was born in 1728, and joined the British Army in c. 1745. In 1748 he was an ensign in the 7th Regiment of Foot and by the start of the Seven Years' War he had been promoted to captain, sailing with his regiment from Ireland to help relieve the siege of Fort St Philip in Menorca. The relief failed and his regiment moved to Gibraltar where he served until ill health forced his return to England.

Whilst in England he married and also became aide-de-camp to Lieutenant-colonel Lord Robert Bertie, the commander of the 7th Regiment of Foot. He rejoined the regiment in Gibraltar and received promotion to major on 14 December 1761 in the 7th Foot. Returning with the regiment to England, he left the army because of ill health and settled back in Jersey Channel Islands.

Becoming involved in politics and following the Corn Riots disturbances in 1769, Corbet was appointed as the Lieutenant Governor of Jersey on 4 April 1771. In 1779 a French invasion of Jersey was attempted at St Ouen's Bay. The British garrison, led by Corbet, were able to prevent the landing, suffering only a few men wounded when a cannon burst.

== Battle of Jersey ==
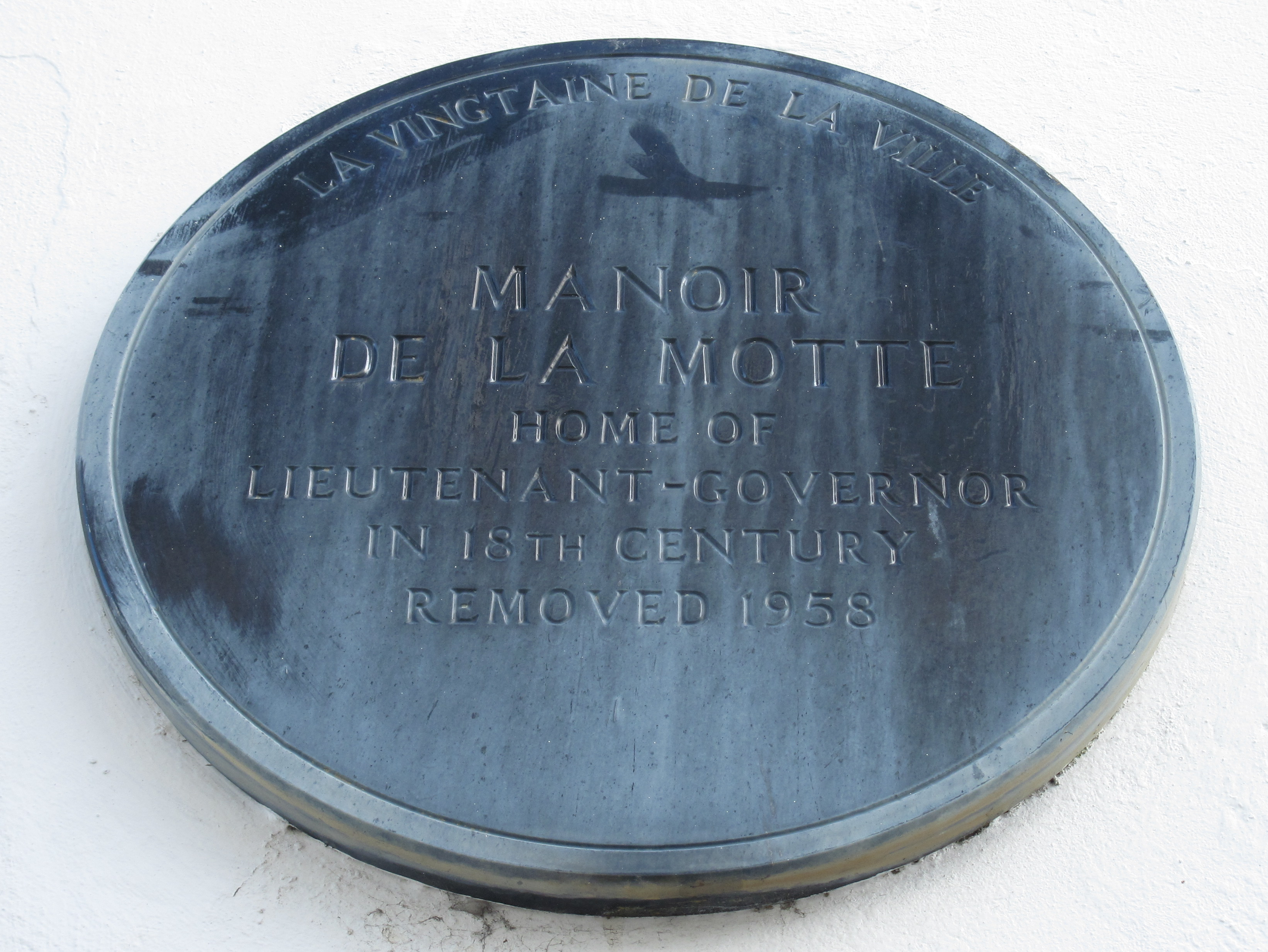
Plaque on site of former Government House where Moses Corbet was captured by French invading forces on 6 January 1781

On 6 January 1781 a French invasion force led by Philippe de Rullecourt secured the town of Saint Helier and surprised Corbet in bed in Government House (then situated at Le Manoir de La Motte). De Rullecourt convinced Corbet that thousands of French troops had already overwhelmed Jersey. He threatened to burn the town and slaughter the inhabitants if the garrison did not capitulate and Corbet, unable to ascertain the true situation, surrendered. Major Francis Peirson, suspecting that De Rullecourt only had a small force, took command of the British troops in Corbet's absence and counter-attacked leading to a decisive engagement in which the British forces were victorious.

Corbet was subsequently tried by court-martial at Horse Guards.

The charges were

- Allowing himself to be surprised by the enemy
- Signing articles of capitulation when a prisoner
- Attempting to induce other officers in command to concur

Rullecourt had written the capitulation letter in his own hand and to get Corbet to sign threatened to destroy the town and shipping in the harbour, disclosing in great detail the defences of the Island, leading Corbet to believe many units had been captured and wishing to save the town from destruction by fire, and believing his powers of command had already been removed as he was a prisoner, agreed to sign. Corbet received good references from Bertie and others. The outcome of the court-martial was inconclusive; he was dismissed as lieutenant-governor, but granted a pension of £250 p.a. for life. Corbet died in 1814.

== Portrait ==
A formal full-length portrait of Corbet was created by the artist Philip Jean. Jean was made famous for his miniature portrait of Guernsey born Sir Isaac Brock as well as his commissioned portrait of George III.

Government offices
Preceded by Rudolph Bentinck (acting)	Lieutenant Governor of Jersey; 1771–1781	Succeeded by Francis Peirson
