= Philippe de Rullecourt =

Philipe de Rullecort
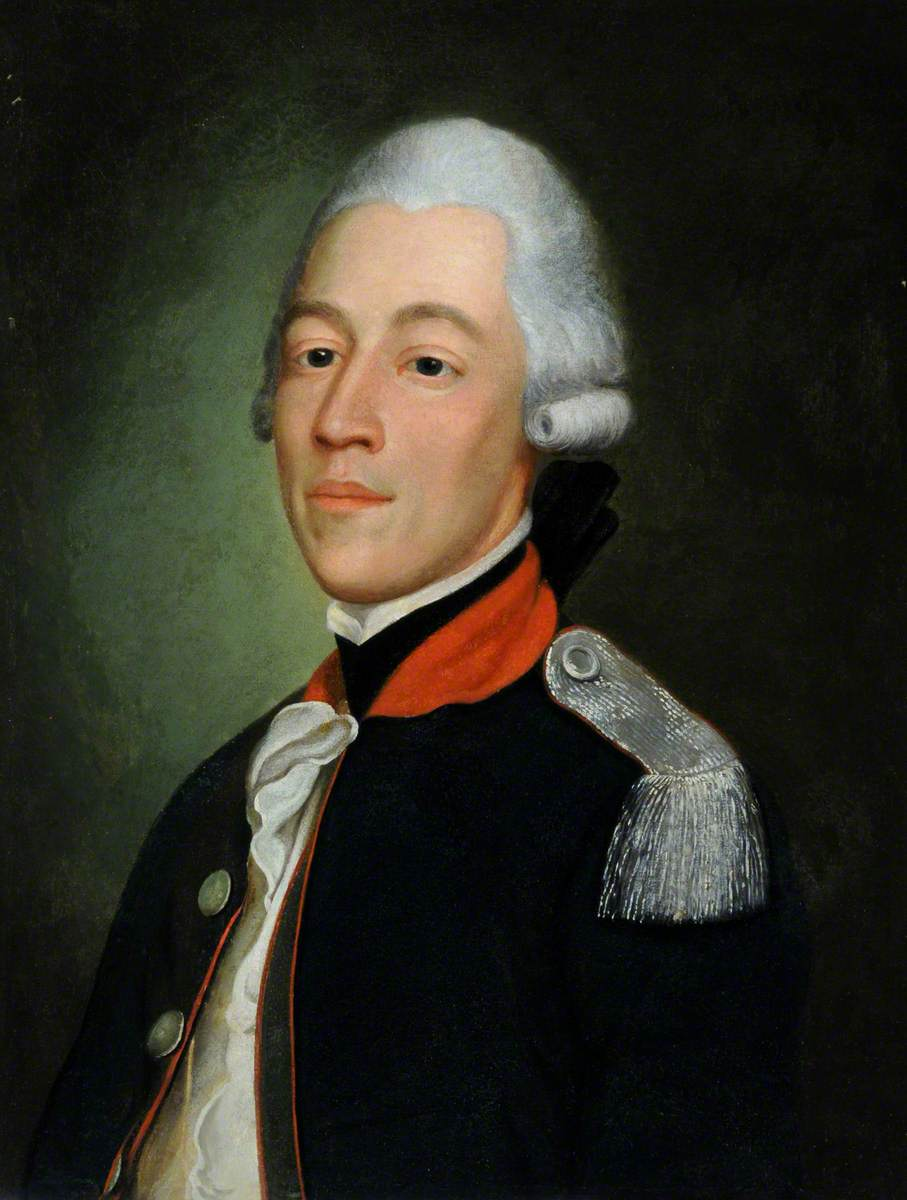
- Philipe, Baron de Rullecort
- Born: 9 July 1744
- Died: 7 January 1781 (aged 36); Jersey
- Military career
- Allegiance: France
- Branch: French Royal Army
- Rank: Colonel
- Conflicts: Invasion of Jersey (1779); Battle of Jersey

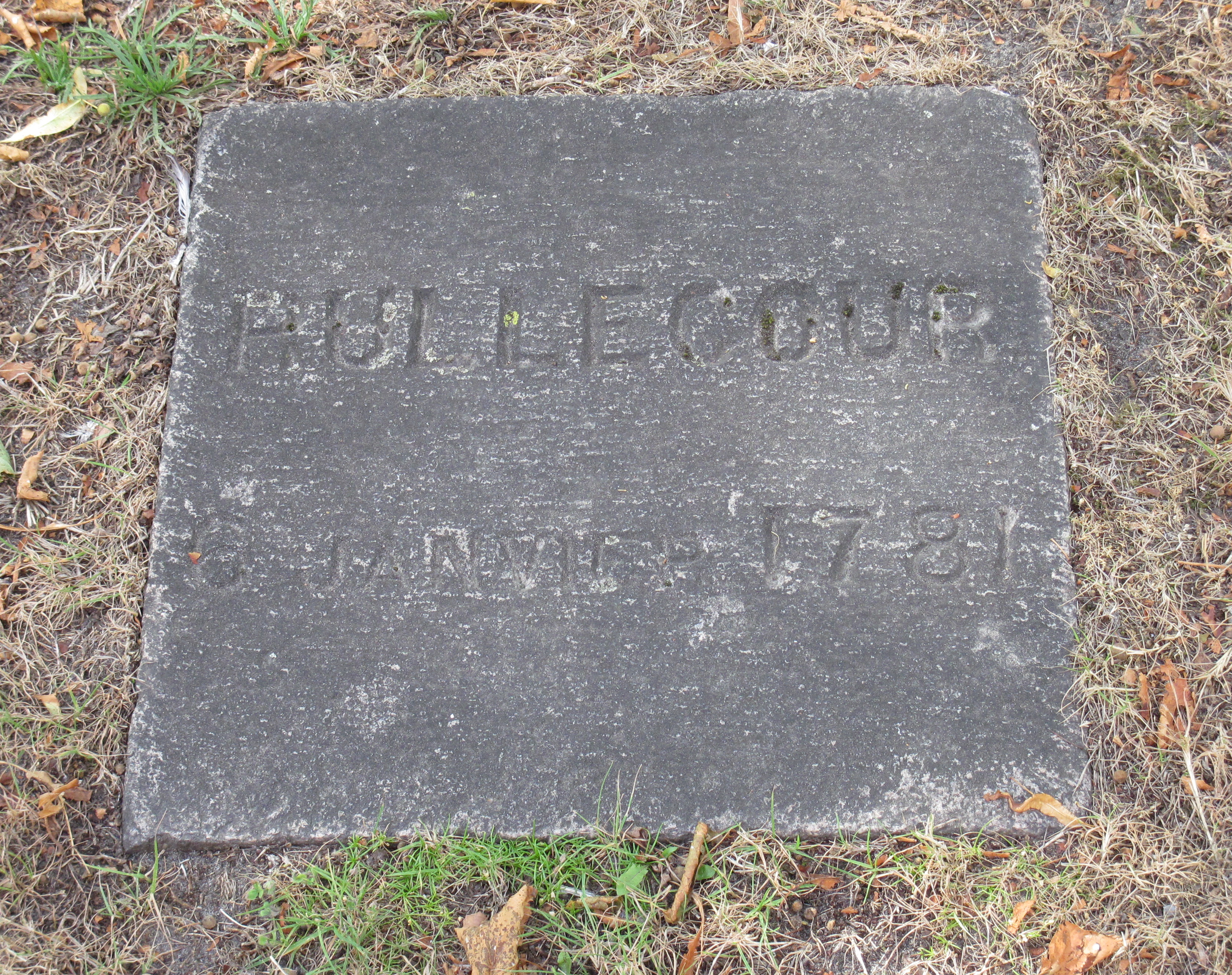
Memorial stone of Baron de Rullecourt in Saint Helier Parish churchyard where the Baron was buried

Colonel Philipe Charles Félix Macquart, Baron de Rullecourt (9 July 1744 – 7 January 1781) was a French Royal Army officer who served in the American Revolutionary War. In 1781, he was mortally wounded commanding the attempted invasion of Jersey at the Battle of Jersey.

== Biography ==
Philipe Charles Félix Macquart was born in Artois in a wealthy family originating in Orléans, although his title "Baron de Rullecourt" was self-bestowed. He was working as a soldier for hire, when he was placed in command of French Royal Army troops during the failed French invasion of Jersey in 1779, as second-in-command to Karl Heinrich von Nassau-Siegen.

Two years later, he launched another invasion attempt on Jersey. Rullecourt's second-in-command Mir Sayyad advised him to ransack the island and to kill all its civilians, but instead he captured the island's governor Moses Corbet, and used him as a tool to try and engineer a British surrender. But the British troops on the island refused to surrender, and Rullecourt was mortally wounded in the following battle in which the British outnumbered the French. Rullecourt died a day later of his wounds, in the modern-day Peirson Pub. He had failed in his attempt to bluff the British into surrender.
