= Lieutenant Governor of Jersey =

Representative of the British monarch in the Bailiwick of Jersey

- Coat of arms of Jersey

- Flag of the lieutenant governor of Jersey

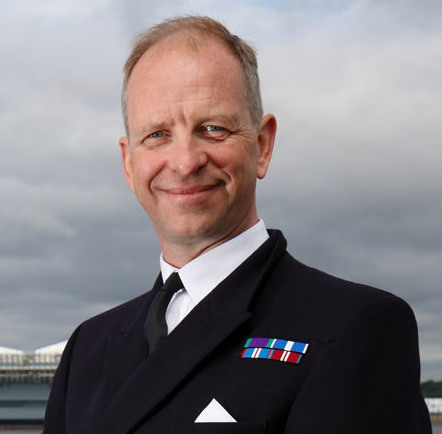
- Incumbent; Vice-Admiral Sir Jerry Kyd since 8 October 2022
- Style: His Excellency
- Residence: Government House
- Appointer: The Monarch
- Term length: Five years
- Formation: 1502
- First holder: Sir Hugh Vaughan (as Governor of Jersey)
- Website: www.governmenthouse.gov.je

The lieutenant governor of Jersey (Jèrriais: Gouvèrneux d'Jèrri, "Governor of Jersey"), properly styled the lieutenant-governor of Jersey (French: Lieutenant-Gouverneur de Jersey), is the representative of the British monarch in the Bailiwick of Jersey, a dependency of the British Crown.

Presently, there is no governor of Jersey (French: Gouverneur de Jersey), the role having devolved its responsibilities onto the lieutenant governors and then been discontinued in 1854. The position of lieutenant governor is now itself largely ceremonial, with day-to-day responsibility over most functions of government overseen by the Chief Minister of Jersey and judicial and certain other official matters overseen by the Bailiff of Jersey.

== Duties ==
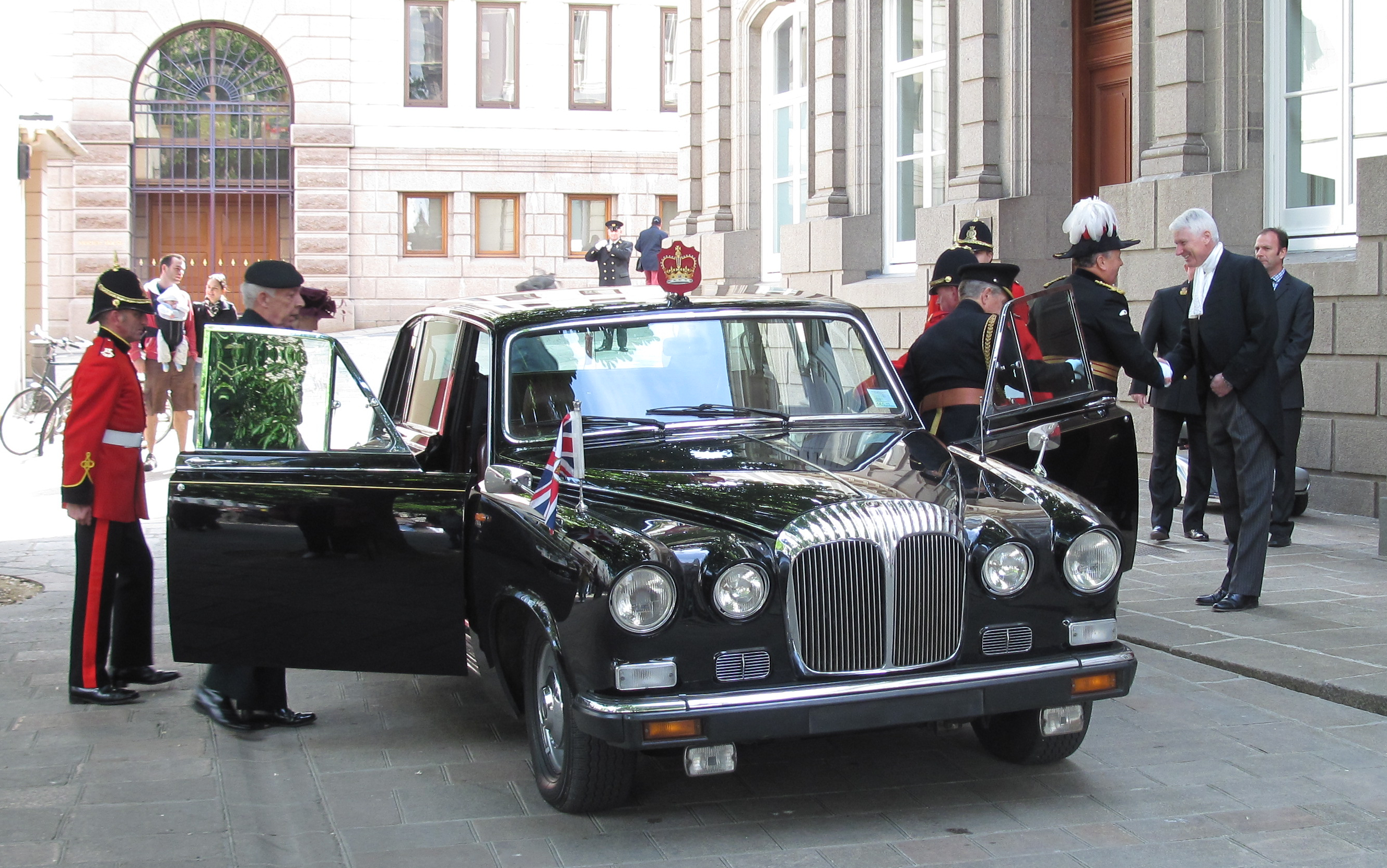
The Bailiff greeting Lt Governor Andrew Ridgway in the Royal Square of St Helier on Liberation Day, 2010.

The lieutenant governor serves as the Viceroy of the Monarch in Jersey, performing various ceremonial functions and liaising between the Governments of Jersey and the United Kingdom. The lieutenant governor also exercises certain executive functions relating broadly to citizenship, including involvement with passports, deportation, and nationality. Jersey passports are British passports issued on behalf of the lieutenant governor, in the exercise of the royal prerogative, through the Passport Office which the States fund and from which the States retain any revenue generated. Deportation from Jersey is formally ordered by the lieutenant governor. Certificates of naturalization as a British citizen are issued by the lieutenant governor.

Ex officio, the lieutenant governor is a member of the States of Jersey but may not vote and, by convention, speaks in the Chamber only on appointment and on departure from post.

== History ==
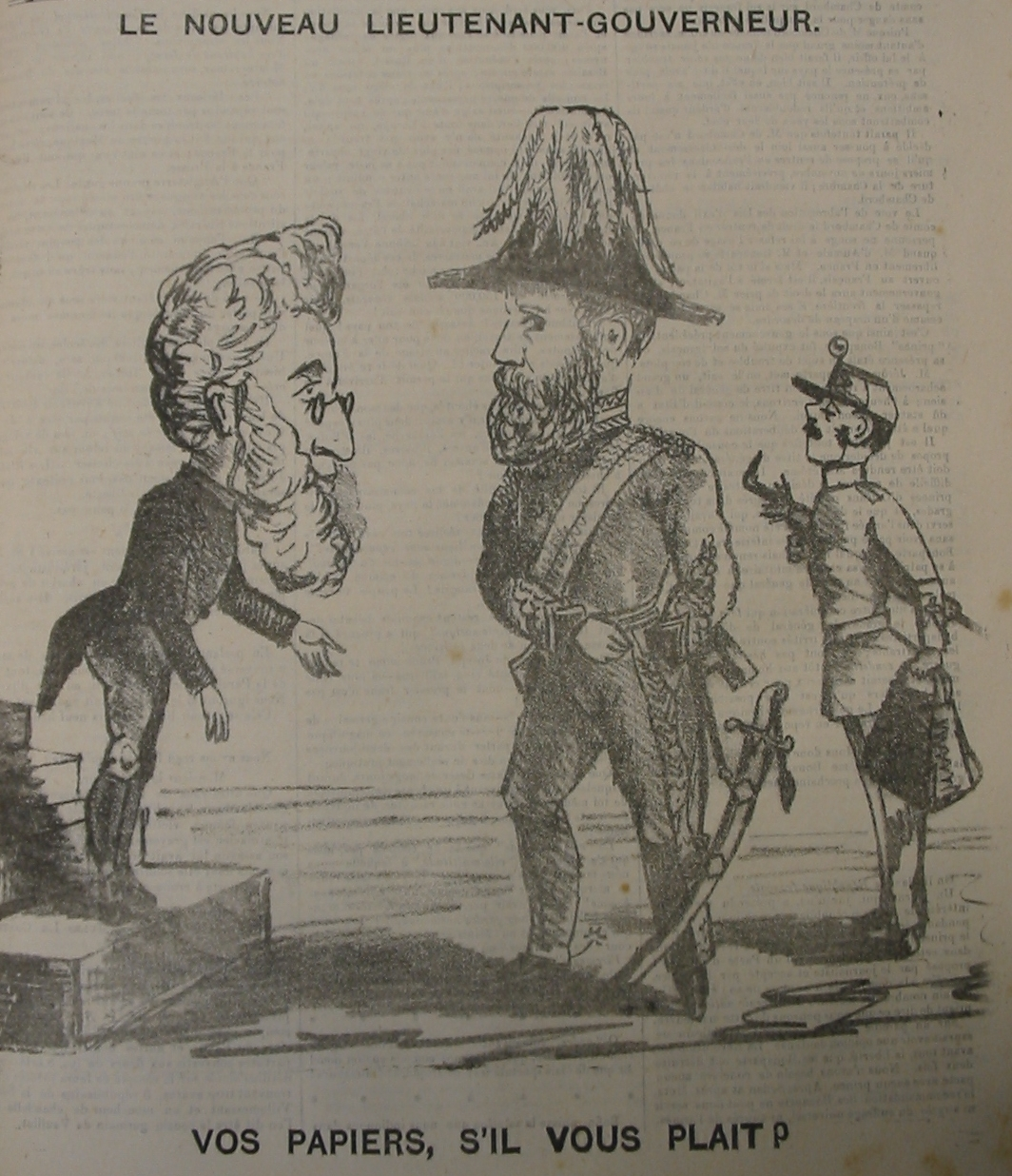
Bailiff Jean Hammond greeting Lt Governor William Norcott in an 1873 caricature.

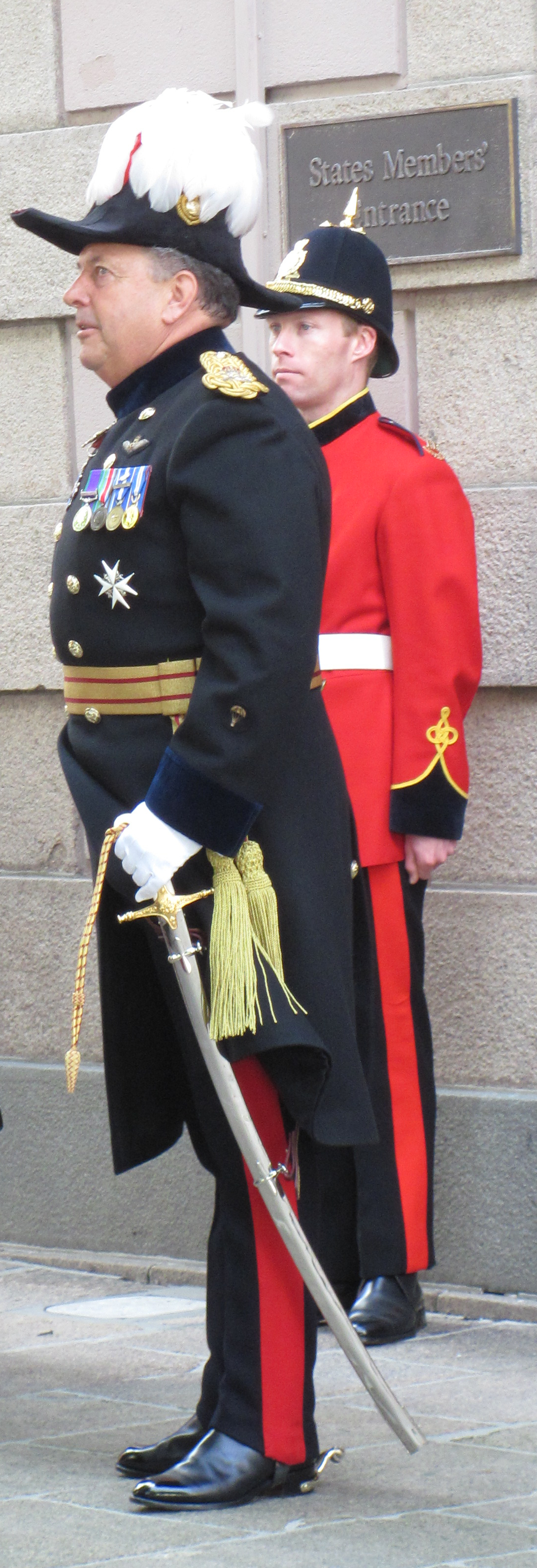
Lt Governor Ridgway on Liberation Day, 2010

The unusual position of the lieutenant governor is a product of the unusual situation created when the once-Viking dukes of Normandy, vassals of the kings of France, became kings of England and subsequently claimed the French throne itself. Despite the loss of Normandy and failure of the First and main Hundred Years' Wars, the situation caused the terms of the 1259 Treaty of Paris to be generally maintained and the Channel Islands were organized separately from the Kingdom of England and its successor states and held directly under the Crown.

From 933, the dukes of Normandy and then kings of England held the islands directly. Beginning with Prince John on 8 February 1198, they began to be delegated to a series of princes and royal favourites like Peter de Preaux as feudal lords of the isles (Latin: dominus insularum; French: seigneur des îles). Actual administrative control was separately placed with a warden of the isles (custos insularum; gardien des îles), at first typically a member of the king's household knights or the royal council. This post was given wide autonomy in command and judgment alongside 12 sworn coroners (coronatores juratos) charged to preserve and clarify the local traditions, obligations, and freedoms and some of its holders were greatly enriched by the provision of terra Normannorum, lands seized from previous owners obliged to swear fealty to the Capetian king of France to preserve their other holdings on the Continent. The wardens were initially appointed by the islands' lords but, particularly under the long and neglectful rule of Edward I's favourite Otto de Grandson, some were appointed directly by the king to ensure the islands' allegiance and protection during times of hostility with France. This became standard after the lordship became hereditary in the line of Henry Beauchamp and then ceased to be awarded upon the line's extinguishment. As early as 1201, the lords and wardens were both sometimes described as the bailiff of the islands (ballivus insularum; bailli des îles), but this gradually became a separate position held by a separate agent.

Following the capture of Mont Orgueil and Jersey's occupation by the French from 1461–1468 owing to the support of Pierre de Brézé, seneschal of Normandy, to the Lancastrian cause of his cousin Margaret of Anjou during the Wars of the Roses, greater attention was paid to the islands' organisation and defense. Upon its reconquest by Richard Harliston, he was named captain of the isles (capitaine des îles) or captain-in-chief (capitaine en chef). Shortly thereafter in 1473, the previous captains or subwardens (subcustos) at Jersey and Guernsey were replaced by separate captains or governors (gouverneur) overseeing the local garrisons. Jurisdictional friction with the islands' bailiffs culminated in legal disputes between the captain John Peyton and the bailiff Jean Hérault, who was attempting to usurp the title of "governor". A series of rulings by the Privy Council from 1616 to 1618 determined that Jersey's captain would be formally styled its governor but largely restricted to military matters, while the bailiff would exercise most civil and judicial responsibilities without his oversight; Guernsey's officials followed suit shortly thereafter.

After the Stuart Restoration, King Charles II—who had previously escaped to France via Jersey—rewarded the island with the power to levy customs duties. The post of governor of Jersey thereafter became a sinecure chiefly used for its incomes, with its responsibilities discharged after 1806 by lieutenant governors. Following the long and entirely absent "service" of William Beresford as governor, the post was left vacant. Since his death in 1856, the Crown has been formally and constitutionally represented in Jersey by lieutenant governors. The lieutenant governors have gradually lost various powers of their office. Jersey's custom duties—previously levied by an assembly consisting of the governor, bailiff, and jurats—has been controlled by the States of Jersey since 1921, removing most control over the island's finances by the lieutenant governor; the States of Jersey Law 2005 abolished the lieutenant governor's previous ability to veto resolutions of the States; and the recommendation of future lieutenant governors was announced in 2010 to be the responsibility of a panel on Jersey rather than of the ministers of the United Kingdom.

== List of governors of Jersey ==
Date	Governor
1470–1483	Richard Harliston (Captain in Chief of Jersey)
1486–1494	Matthew Baker
1494–1500	Thomas Overay
1500–1502	Jean Lempriere
1502–1531	Sir Hugh Vaughan (first to be known as Governor)
1532–1534	Sir Anthony Ughtred
1534–1536	Sir Arthur Darcy
1536–1537	Sir Thomas Vaux, Lord Vaux
1537–1550	Sir Edward Seymour
1550–1574	Sir Hugh Paulet
1574–1590	Sir Amyas Paulet
1590–1600	Sir Anthony Paulet
1600–1603	Sir Walter Raleigh
1603–1630	Sir John Peyton
1631–1643	Sir Thomas Jermyn
1644–1651	Sir Henry Jermyn, 1st Earl of St Albans
1651–1654	Colonel James Heane
1655–1659	Colonel Robert Gibbon
1659–1660	Colonel John Mason
1660	Colonel Carew Raleigh
1660–1665	Sir Henry Jermyn, 1st Earl of St Albans
1665–1679	Sir Thomas Morgan, 1st Baronet
1679–1684	Sir John Lanier
1684–1703	Thomas Jermyn, 2nd Baron Jermyn
1704–1722	General Henry Lumley
1723–1749	Richard Temple, 1st Viscount Cobham
1749–1761	Lieutenant General John Huske
1761–1772	George Keppel, 3rd Earl of Albemarle
1772–1795	Field Marshal Henry Seymour Conway
1795–1796	Field Marshal Sir George Howard
1796–1807	George Townshend, 1st Marquess Townshend
1807–1820	John Pitt, 2nd Earl of Chatham
1820–1854	William Beresford, 1st Viscount Beresford (Last Governor)

== List of lieutenant governors of Jersey ==
Lieutenant Governors of Jersey have been:

Title	Appointed	Name
	1634	Sir Philippe de Carteret (Royalist)
	26 August 1643	Major Lydcott (Parliament)
	24 November 1643	Sir George Carteret (Royalist)
	at least by 1689	Edward Harris
	3 March 1695	Col. Thomas Collier
	29 July 1715	Robert Wilson
	1723	Magnus Kempenfelt
	23 October 1727	Col. George Howard
	1732	Peter Bettesworth
	1738	Maj-Gen. Jean Cavalier
	1741	Francis Best
	1747	Gregory Beake
	12 August 1749	William Deane
	26 June 1753	George Colingwood
Lieutenant Governor and Colonel on Staff:	7 July 1770	Lt-Col. Rudolph Bentinck (acting)
	4 April 1771	Major Moses Corbet
	6 January 1781	Major Francis Peirson (acting) (killed in action, 6 January 1781)
	5 October 1797	Lt-Gen. Andrew Gordon
	21 June 1806	Gen. Sir George Don
	8 October 1814	Gen. Sir Tomkyns Hilgrove Turner
	9 May 1816	Lt-Gen. Hugh Mackay Gordon
	23 July 1821	Gen. Sir Colin Halkett
	26 November 1830	Lt-Gen. Sir William Thornton
	22 April 1835	Maj-Gen. Archibald Campbell
	14 September 1838	Lt-Gen. Sir Edward Gibbs
	16 January 1847	Maj-Gen. Sir James Henry Reynett
	30 April 1852	Gen. Sir James Frederick Love
	30 January 1857	Maj-Gen. Godfrey Charles Mundy
	18 September 1860	Maj-Gen. Sir Robert Percy Douglas
	5 October 1862	B. Loch (acting)
	23 October 1863	Lt-Gen. Sir Burke Douglas Cuppage
	1 October 1868	Maj-Gen. Philip Melmoth Nelson Guy
	1 October 1873	Lt-Gen. Sir William Sherbrooke Ramsay Norcott
	1 October 1878	Lt-Gen. Lothian Nicholson
	1 October 1883	Maj-Gen. Henry Wray
	1 November 1887	Lt-Gen. Charles Brisbane Ewart
Lieutenant Governor and Commanding the Troops:	1 November 1892	Lt-Gen. Sir Edwin Markham
	10 May 1895	Lt-Gen. Sir Edward Hopton
	1 November 1900	Maj-Gen. Henry Richard Abadie
	1904	Maj-Gen. Hugh Sutlej Gough
	16 June 1910	Maj-Gen. Sir Alexander Nelson Rochfort
	7 October 1916	Maj-Gen. Sir Alexander Wilson
	29 October 1920	Maj-Gen. Sir William Douglas Smith
	1924	Maj-Gen. Sir Francis Richard Bingham
	28 May 1929	Maj-Gen. Edward Henry Willis
	28 May 1934	Maj-Gen. Sir Horace de Courcy Martelli
	1939	Maj-Gen. James Murray Robert Harrison
(German Occupation 1940–1945)		
Head of the British Military Government:	12 May 1945	L.A. Freeman
Lieutenant Governor and Commander-in-Chief:	25 August 1945	Lt-Gen. Sir Arthur Edward Grasett
	16 October 1953	Adm. Sir Randolph Stewart Gresham Nicholson
	15 November 1958	Gen. Sir George Erskine
	15 January 1964	Vice-Adm. Sir John Michael Villiers
	30 June 1969	Air Chf Mshl Sir John Gilbert Davis
	2 September 1974	Gen. Sir Geoffrey Richard Desmond Fitzpatrick
	26 November 1979	Gen. Sir Peter John Frederick Whiteley
	9 January 1985	Adm. Sir William Thomas Pillar
	1990	Air Mshl Sir John Matthias Dobson Sutton
	September 1995	Gen. Sir Michael John Wilkes
	24 January 2001	Air Chf Mshl Sir John Cheshire
	1 April 2006	Lt-Gen Sir Andrew Ridgway
	26 September 2011	Gen. Sir John McColl
	13 March 2017	Air Chf Mshl Sir Stephen Dalton
	8 October 2022	Vice Admiral Sir Jerry Kyd

== Flag ==
The lieutenant governor has his own flag in Jersey, the Union Flag defaced with the bailiwick's coat of arms.

== Residence ==
The official residence of the lieutenant governor is Government House in St Saviour, Jersey. It was depicted on the Jersey £50 note during the period 1989–2010.

== See also ==
- Bailiff of Jersey
- Lieutenant Governor of Guernsey
