= Government House, Jersey =

Official residence of the Lieutenant Governor of Jersey

Government House
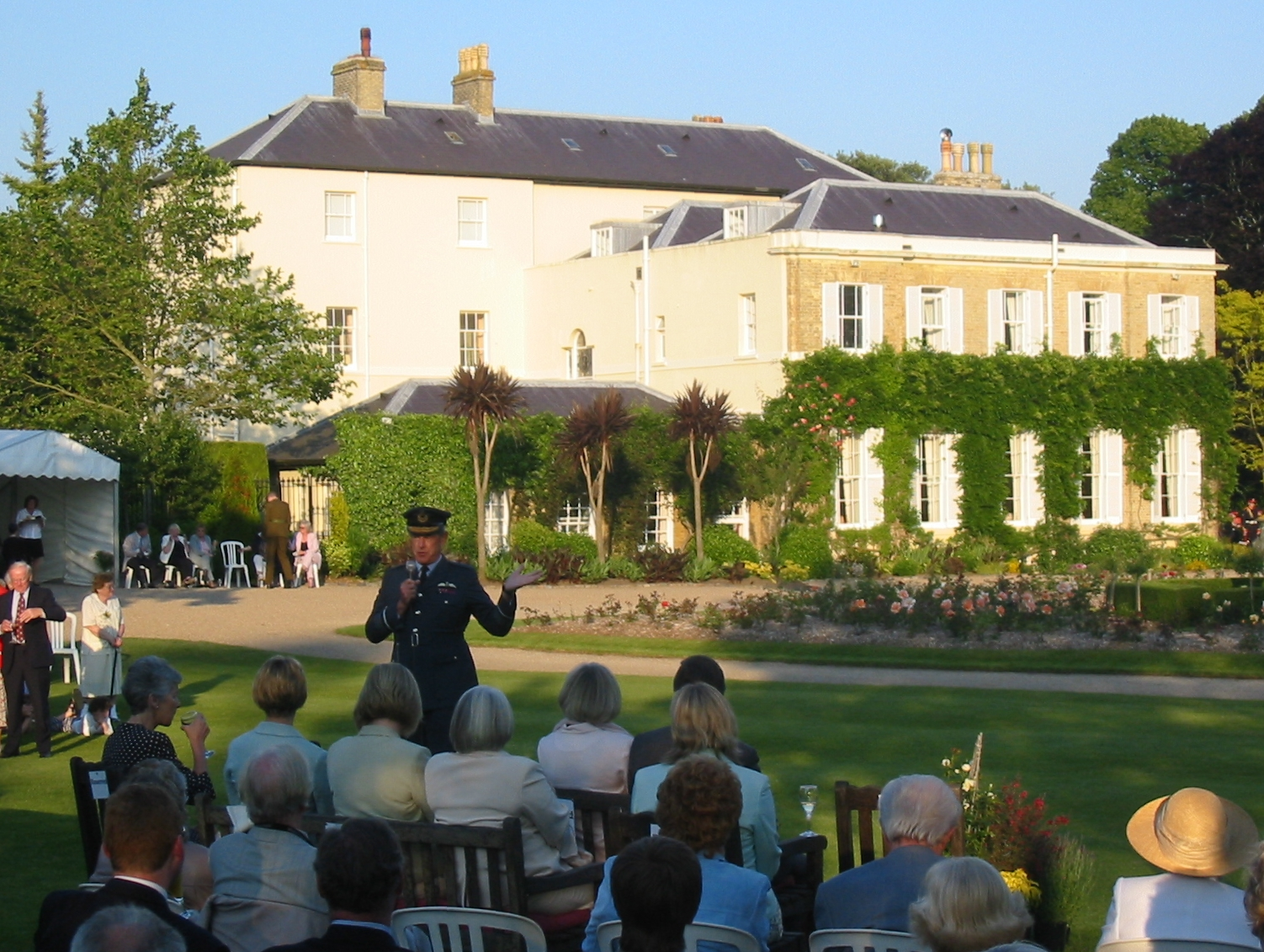
- Birthday celebrations for Queen Elizabeth II at Government House in 2005
- Interactive map of the Government House area
- Former names: Belmont

General information
- Type: official residence
- Location: St Saviour, Jersey
- Coordinates: 49.19486°N 2.094403°W
- Current tenants: Lieutenant Governor of Jersey
- Construction started: 1814
- Owner: States of Jersey

Website
- Government House

Government House is the official residence of the lieutenant governor of Jersey. The building is situated in the parish of St Saviour in Jersey. It is also used for ceremonial functions, receptions and meetings with visiting foreign dignitaries and heads of state. It is also the official residence of the Duke of Normandy (currently King Charles III) as head of state when staying in Jersey.

== History of Government House ==
=== Previous Government Houses ===
The current building is at least the fifth official residence of governors and lieutenant governors of Jersey. Early governors or their lieutenants resided at Mont Orgueil and later at Elizabeth Castle, although the latter's status as a tidal island meant that for convenience accommodation in the town of Saint Helier was sought. Colonel Magnus Kempenfelt is known to have resided in a house belonging to a man named Le Geyt in 1727. At the time of the Battle of Jersey in 1781, Major Moise Corbet resided at Le Manoir de la Motte, where he was apprehended by the French invaders. Around 1800, under General Andrew Gordon, a house adjacent to the Royal Square was acquired, described in 1809 as a "large, substantial and commodious stone mansion with appropriate offices, pleasure and kitchen gardens". Under General Sir George Don, the house was enlarged by the addition of offices for the conduct of public business, but Major-General Sir Colin Halkett was petitioning the British Government in 1821 to agree the exchange of this town centre property on the grounds that the house needed expensive repairs, was prone to flooding from Le Grand Douet, the adjacent brook, and that "the rooms are ill calculated for public entertainment".

=== The current Government House ===
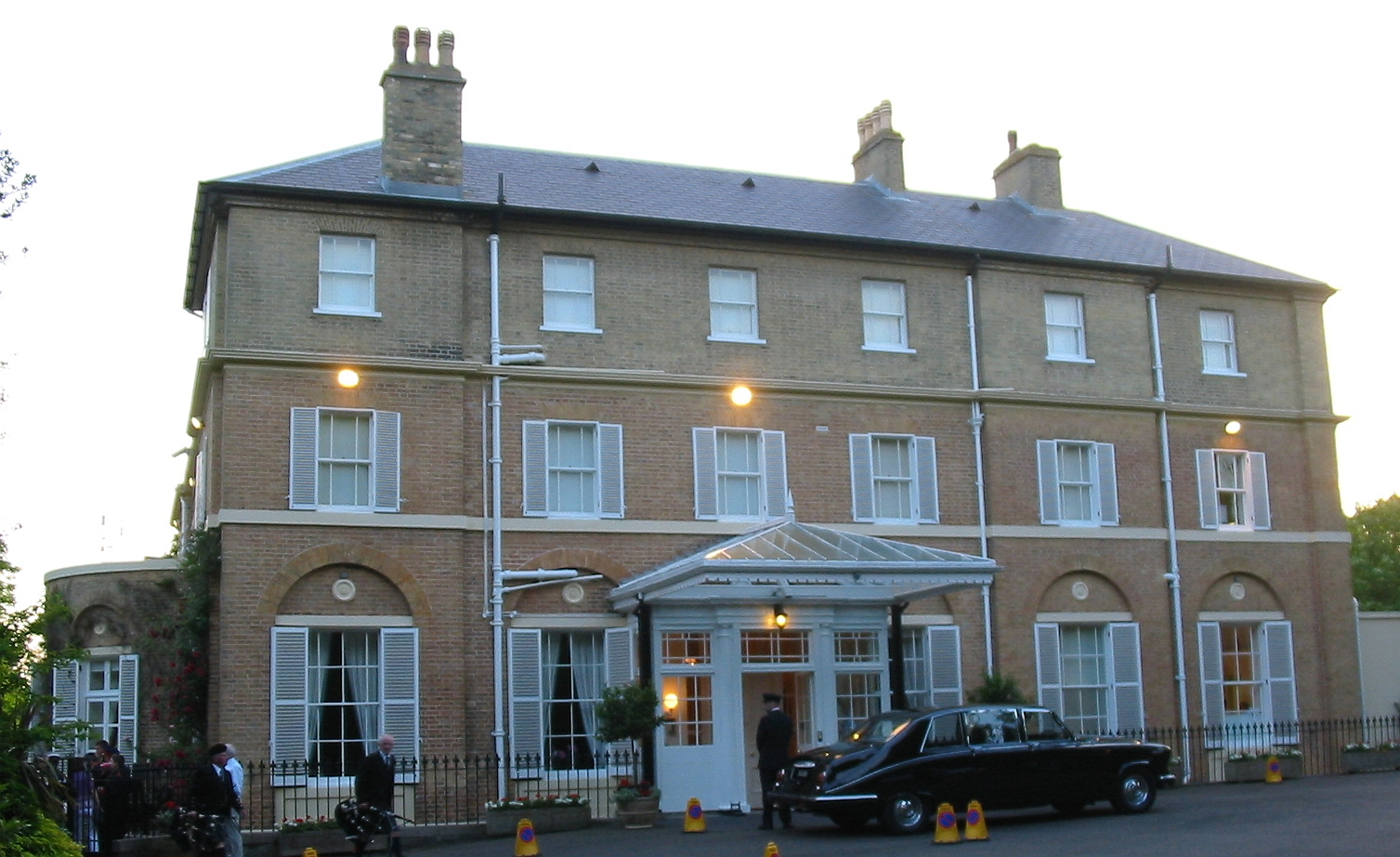
Government House, in St. Saviour, Jersey

In 1803, the rector of St Saviour's Church, Rev. Philip Le Breton, bought the land on which the current Government House is situated and built a family home. This was bought by the ship owner François Janvrin in 1814 who demolished the house and built a small two-storey villa, naming the house Belmont. He brought mahogany from South America in his ships which enabled the use of this wood throughout the interior, including the main staircase, which remains a notable feature of the house. In 1822, Major-General Sir Colin Halkett, lieutenant governor, transacted the exchange of the old Government House in Saint Helier and Le Pré au Roi in Saint Clement for the Belmont property and additional land. It has been the official residence of all the lieutenant governors of Jersey ever since.

Major-General (later promoted Lt.-General) Halkett had written that the lieutenant governor "would at Belmont possess the desirable opportunity of seeing together, without apparent partiality, such of the inhabitants, and strangers, as naturally expected to be invited to Government House". But his ADC John Le Couteur criticised the property and wrote that "the masonry... is shamefully done". The guardhouse was built at this time at a cost of £215, but the house was regarded as unprepossessing.

Projects to add a third storey were entertained, but not carried out until the second half of the 19th century. Further improvements were carried out, including the addition of a porte-cochère.

The drive was formerly part of La Ruette du Sacrement, leading to Saint Saviour's Church. This lane was purchased in 1810, and replaced as a thoroughfare by the new military road (St Saviour's Hill – Jèrriais: Lé Mont du Gouvèrneux, the Governor's hill). From the formal lawns next to the house, the 12-acre grounds descend from the house in a valley setting, and include an ornamental lake and fountain created in 2009 that can be seen from the road. Commemorative trees and monuments are situated around the grounds. The lieutenant-governor's flag is flown from a flagpole in the grounds when he is in the Island.

During the German occupation of the Channel Islands during the Second World War, the house was used as the residence of Generalleutnant Rudolf Graf von Schmettow, the German commandant of the Channel Islands.

The 1989 issue of a £50 Jersey banknote showed an image of Government House on the reverse.

== See also ==
- Government House – elsewhere in the Commonwealth or British Overseas Territories
- Government Houses of the British Empire and Commonwealth
