= Hilgrove Turner =

British Army officer

General Sir Hilgrove Turner GCH KC
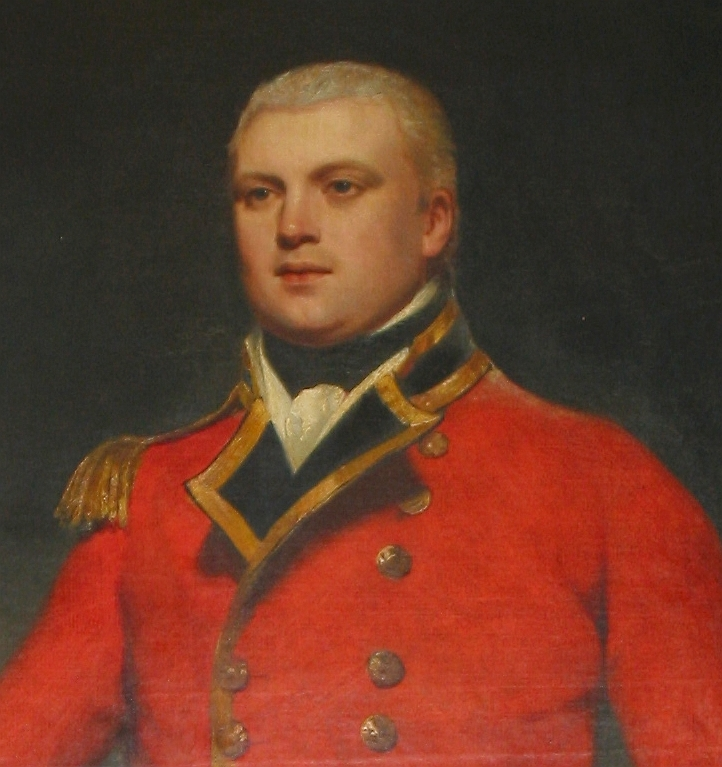
- Portrait by unknown artist
- Born: 12 January 1764; Uxbridge (Middlesex, England)
- Died: 6 May 1843 (aged 79); Grouville (Jersey, Channel Isles)
- Military career
- Allegiance: Great Britain; United Kingdom
- Branch: British Army
- Rank: General
- Commands: Garrison of Jersey
- Conflicts: French Revolutionary Wars; Napoleonic Wars
- Awards: Knight Grand Cross of the Royal Guelphic Order

General Sir Tomkyns Hilgrove Turner GCH (12 January 1764 – 6 May 1843) was a British Army officer best known for escorting the Rosetta Stone from Egypt to England.

== Military career ==
Turner was commissioned as an ensign on 20 February 1782, into the Third Regiment of Foot Guards. In 1792, he was a Lieutenant and Captain. Turner and the Stone were on board the recently captured frigate HMS Egyptienne when it made its way to England in September, 1801. He claimed that he had personally seized the Stone from General Jacques-François Menou and carried it away on a gun carriage. He also asserted that when the French learned of his intentions, that they removed the packaging for the Stone and that "it was thrown upon its face". There are other versions of how British forces captured the stone from the French, so it is unknown how reliable his account is. He was elected a Fellow of the Royal Society in December 1804.

In 1801 he was made Colonel, in 1808 Major-General. He became Colonel of the 19th (or The 1st Yorkshire North Riding) Regiment of Foot on 27 April 1811 (his rank in the regiment being different from his rank in the army). From 1812 to 1830 he held the post of Groom of the Bedchamber to George IV (including the period when the latter acted as Prince Regent during his father's mental illness). He would later become Lieutenant Governor of Jersey from 1814 to 1816 and Governor and military Commander-in-chief of Bermuda, which was elevated to an Imperial fortress in the aftermath of the independence of the colonies that became the United States, from 1826 to 1832, and in 1827 became a Knight Grand Cross of the Royal Guelphic Order.

== Personal life ==
Turner was the son of Richard Turner, a surgeon in Uxbridge, Middlesex and his wife Magdalen Hilgrove, a native of Jersey. In 1839 his daughter Charlotte Esther Turner married Henry Octavius Coxe, Bodleian librarian. Coxe's predecessor Bulkeley Bandinel was Tomkyns Turner's second cousin. Some years after his death Turner's children were involved in a lawsuit over the legacies left them in the wills of some Hilgrove kinsmen.

Government offices
Preceded by Sir George Don	Lieutenant Governor of Jersey; 1814–1816	Succeeded by Hugh Gordon
Military offices
Preceded by Sir Hew Dalrymple, 1st Baronet	Colonel of the 19th (The 1st Yorkshire North Riding) Regiment of Foot; 1811–1843	Succeeded by Sir Warren Peacocke
