= Colin Halkett =

British Army general

General Sir Colin Halkett GCB GCH
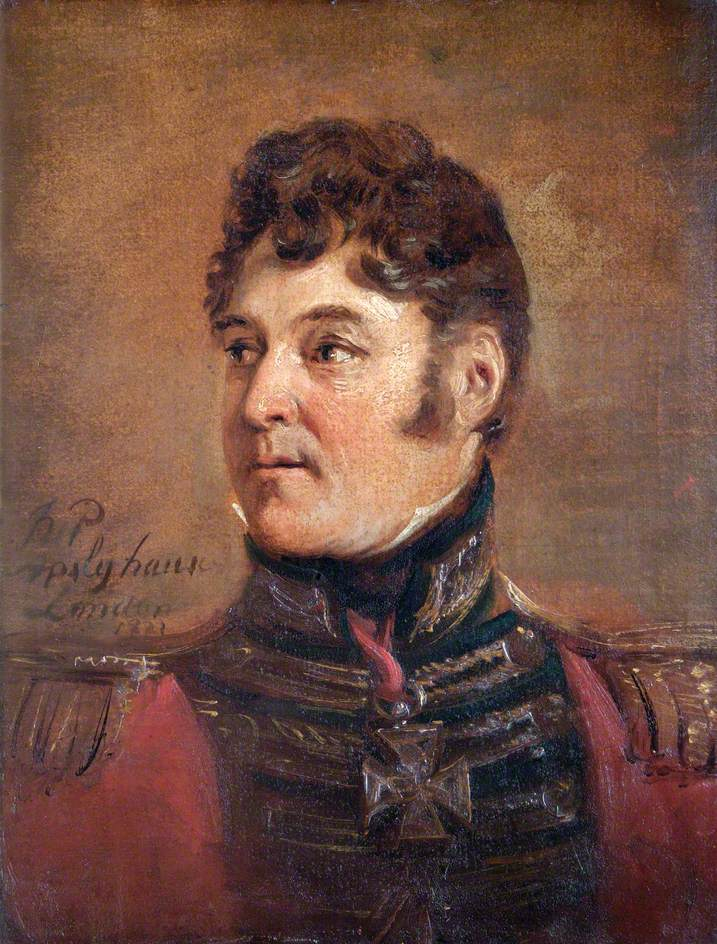
- Portrait by Jan Willem Pieneman, 1821
- Born: 7 September 1774; Venlo, Dutch Republic now the Netherlands
- Died: 24 September 1856 (aged 82)
- Military career
- Allegiance: United Kingdom
- Branch: British Army
- Rank: General
- Commands: Bombay Army
- Conflicts: Peninsular War; Hundred Days
- Awards: Knight Grand Cross of the Order of the Bath; Knight Grand Cross of the Royal Guelphic Order

General Sir Colin Halkett GCB GCH (7 September 1774 – 24 September 1856) was a British Army officer who became Lieutenant Governor of Jersey.

== Family ==
Halkett came from a military family. His father was Major General Frederick Godar Halkett and his younger brother was General Hugh Halkett.

== Military career ==
Halkett began his military career in the Dutch Guards and served in various companies for three years, leaving as a captain in 1795.

From 1800 to 1801 he commanded Dutch troops on the Island of Guernsey. On 28 July 1803, a letter of service was issued to Major Halkett (and to Lieutenant Colonel von der Decken) empowering him "to raise a battalion of infantry with an establishment of four hundred and fifty-nine men" and offering him the rank of lieutenant colonel should he increase the number to eight hundred men. These men formed the nucleus of what was to become the King's German Legion in December 1803. On 17 November 1803, Halkett was promoted to Lieutenant Colonel and given command of the 2nd Light Infantry Battalion. This Battalion was involved in Cathcart's expeditions to Hanover, Rügen and Copenhagen.

=== Peninsular War and Waterloo Campaign ===
In 1811 he was given command of the Light Brigade of the King's German Legion. He held this command throughout the Peninsular War from Albuera to Toulouse. On 1 January 1812 he was promoted to colonel. At the Battle of Salamanca (22 July 1812), he commanded 1st Brigade of the 7th Division under Major General Hope.

Halkett was promoted to Major General on 4 June 1814.

On 18 June 1815, at the Battle of Waterloo he commanded the 5th Brigade in the 3rd Division, under the command of Major General Carl von Alten. He was wounded four times during the course of the battle.

Late in the afternoon, Wellington rode up to the 5th Brigade. The situation was desperate, and casualties were mounting. Halkett asked the Duke, 'My Lord, we are dreadfully cut up; can you not relieve us for a little while?’ 'Impossible!’ Wellington replied. 'Very well My Lord, we'll stand until the last man falls', was Halkett's answer.

== Governor ==
Halkett became Lieutenant Governor of Jersey in 1821 and was the first Lieutenant Governor to reside in the St Saviour Government House, still in use today. During this time he married Letitia Cricket, widow of Captain Tyle of the Royal Artillery. He had a son, Frederick (John) Colin Halkett, on 10 June 1826. He was promoted to lieutenant general on 22 July 1830 and appointed Commander-in-Chief of the Bombay Army in January 1832. He was Governor of the Royal Hospital Chelsea from 1849 until his death in 1856.

He was appointed colonel of the 71st Regiment of Foot on 21 September 1829. On 28 March 1838 he was removed to the 31st Regiment of Foot, and to the 45th Regiment of Foot on 12 July 1847.

Two streets in Saint Helier are named after him.

== Distinctions ==
- Britain
  - Knight Grand Cross of the Order of the Bath (GCB)
  - Gold Cross for Albuera, Salamanca, Vittoria, Nive
  - Waterloo Medal
- Hanover
  - Knight Grand Cross of the Royal Guelphic Order (GCH)
- Portugal
  - Order of the Tower and Sword, 2nd rank
- Bavaria
  - Order of Maximilian Joseph, 2nd rank
- Netherlands
  - Military Order of William, 2nd rank
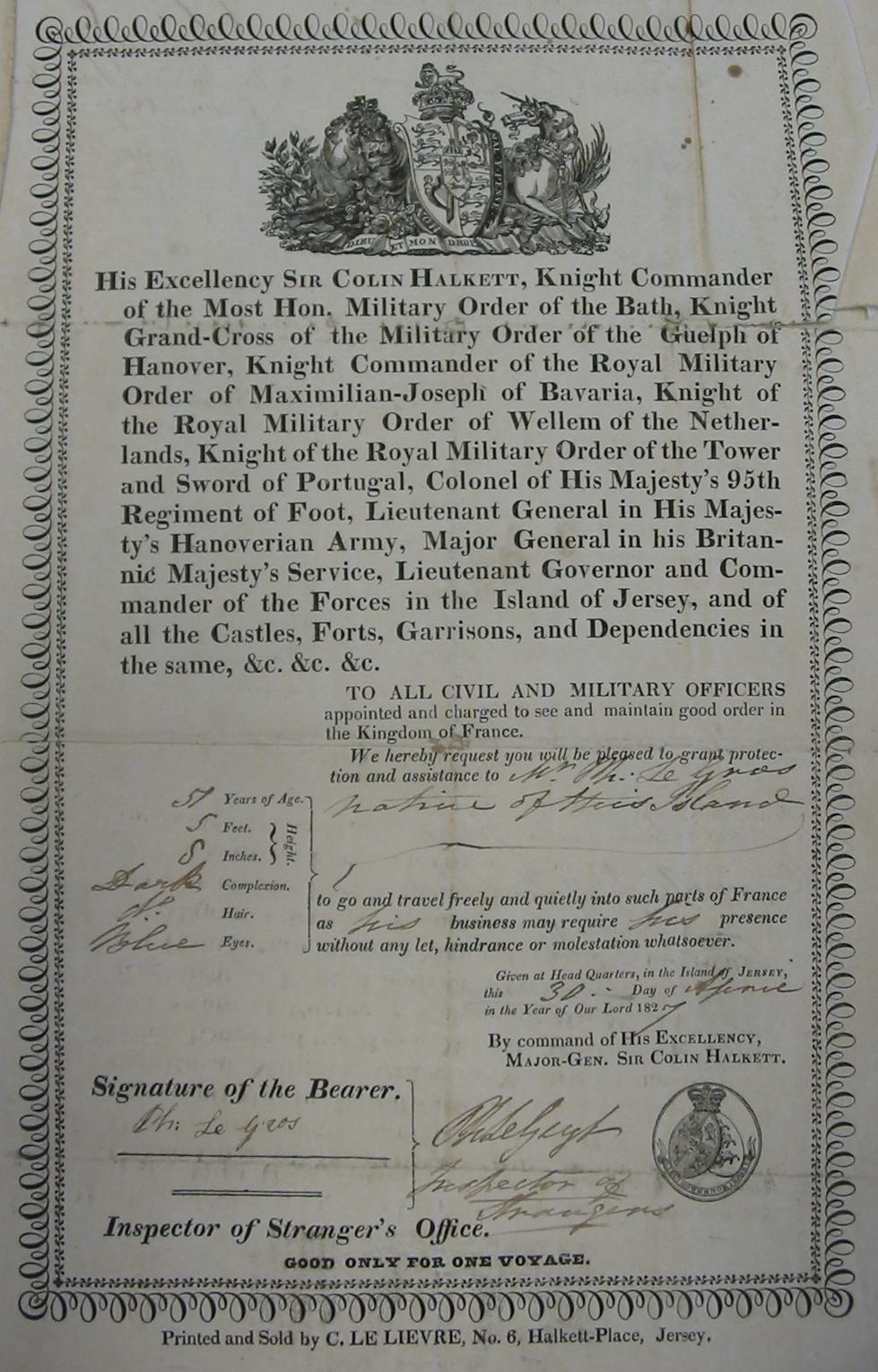
This passport issued in 1827 lists Halkett's titles

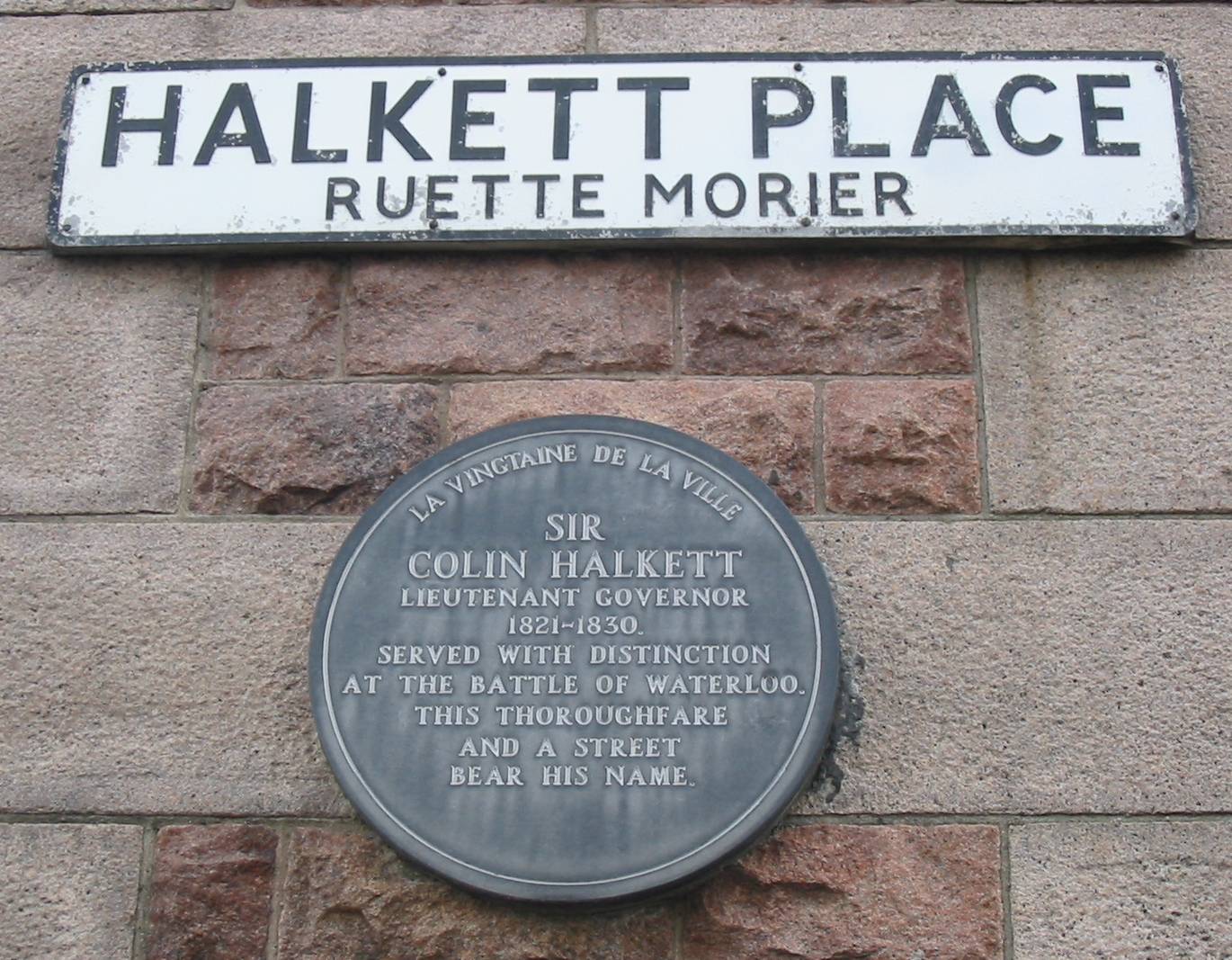
A plaque in Halkett Place, Saint Helier, commemorates Halkett's term as Lieutenant Governor of Jersey

Battle Order of the 1st Brigade at The Battle of Salamanca
Unit	Commander	Number of Men
1st Brigade	Colonel Sir Colin Halkett	unknown
1st Light Battalions King's German Legion	unknown	unknown
2nd Light Battalions King's German Legion	unknown	unknown
7 Cos Brunswick Oels	unknown	unknown

Battle Order of the 5th Brigade at The Battle of Waterloo
Unit	Commander	Number of Men
5th Brigade	Major General Sir Colin Halkett	2,274
2nd/30th Foot Regiment	Lieutenant Colonel Bailey	635
33rd Foot Regiment	Lieutenant Colonel Elphinstone	576
2nd/69th Foot Regiment	Major Muttlebury	565
2nd/73rd Foot Regiment	Lieutenant Colonel Harris	498

== Sources ==
- Beamish, North Ludlow (1997a) [1832]. History of the King's German Legion. Vol. 1, Reprint. Naval and Military Press. ISBN 0-9522011-0-0.
- Beamish, North Ludlow (1997b) [1837]. History of the King's German Legion. Vol. 2, Reprint. Naval and Military Press. ISBN 0-9522011-0-0. OL 23440828M.
- "Online exhibition: Waterloo". Calderdale Museums. 2020.
- Cannon, Richard (1852). Historical Record of the Seventy-First Regiment, Highland Light Infantry. London: Parker, Furnivall, and Parker. p. 131. OCLC 6029811. OL 7083599M.
- Chichester, H. M.; Gates, David (reviewer) (2004). "Colin Halkett". Oxford Dictionary of National Biography (online ed.). Oxford University Press. doi:10.1093/ref:odnb/11935. (Subscription, Wikipedia Library access or UK public library membership required.) The first edition of this text is available at Wikisource: "Halkett, Colin" . Dictionary of National Biography. Vol. 24. 1890. pp. 49–51.
- "Downing-Street, December 30, 1847". The London Gazette (20811): 4789. 30 December 1847.
- Godfrey, Walter H, ed. (1927). "The Royal Hospital: Paymasters General and Officials". Survey of London. 11, Chelsea (4, Royal Hospital). London: London County Council – via British History Online.
- "Art and Literature in the Sale-Room". Navy and Army Illustrated. 18. London: viii. 1904. LCCN 06005658. Wikidata Q96105931.

Government offices
Preceded by Hugh Gordon	Lieutenant Governor of Jersey; 1821–1830	Succeeded by Sir William Thornton
Military offices
Preceded by Sir Thomas Beckwith	C-in-C, Bombay Army; 1832–1834	Succeeded by Sir John Keane
Preceded by Sir Gordon Drummond	Colonel of the 71st (Highland) Regiment of Foot; 1829–1838	Succeeded by Sir Samuel Ford Whittingham
Honorary titles
Preceded by Sir George Anson	Governor, Royal Hospital Chelsea; 1849–1856	Succeeded by Sir Edward Blakeney
