= Sovereign in right of the Bailiwick of Jersey =

Head of State of the Crown Dependency of Jersey

King in right of the Bailiwick of Jersey
- Duke of Normandy; Le Duc de Normandie

Incumbent
- Charles III since 8 September 2022

Details
- Style: His Majesty, The Duke
- Heir apparent: William, Prince of Wales
- Website: royal.uk

King in right of the Bailiwick of Jersey is the formal style of the British Crown in Jersey, who reigns as sovereign and head of state of the crown dependency. They are the successors to the Dukes of Normandy.

The current sovereign is Charles III.

== History ==
Jersey was previously ruled over by the Duke of Normandy and was part of the Duchy of Normandy. In the 11th century William, Duke of Normandy, led the Norman Conquest of England; after defeating Harold Godwinson at the Battle of Hastings in 1066, William was crowned King of England.

From this point the title was held by William's successors as king of England, until in 1204 when the French seized mainland Normandy, with only the Channel Islands remaining under English rule. The title Duke of Normandy was then held by a number of French monarchs. The title was used once more in relation to a British monarch when James II and VII, then James, Duke of York, was referred to as Duke of Normandy by Louis XIV, following the Restoration of the Monarchy.

In modern times the monarch is legally styled "King in right of the Bailiwick of Jersey" on the island, as opposed to "King of the United Kingdom". This is due to Jersey being a crown dependency. However the monarch is still commonly referred to as the Duke of Normandy, or simply "Duke", throughout Jersey. (The style of Duke is used irrespective of gender.)

== Role ==
The king is the sovereign and head of State of Jersey and is represented on the island by a lieutenant governor, who is charged with carrying out the king's constitutional functions there.

== Style of Duke ==
The king is widely referred to on Jersey and the wider Channel Islands as Duke of Normandy. While the title is not used in a constitutional capacity, it is widely used in an official capacity to refer to the sovereign at official and state events on the island.

On the proclamation of Charles III in 2022, the Bailiff of Jersey said during his speech "His Majesty King Charles III sits on the throne and is our sovereign, our Duke."

It is customary in the Loyal toast on the island to refer to "The Duke of Normandy, our King", or "The King, our Duke" rather than just "The King" as is customary in the United Kingdom and other Realms.

== Heir apparent ==
The current heir apparent is Prince William and who will one day become monarch will also become the ruler of the Bailiwick of Jersey in a separate legal role, because Jersey is not part of the UK but a Crown Dependency that recognises the monarch (now Charles III) as its head of state in its own right, so the phrase is simply a formal way of saying the future monarch will be sovereign of Jersey as a distinct jurisdiction as well as of the United Kingdom.
