= Burke Cuppage =

British Army general

Lieutenant-General Sir Burke Cuppage KCB
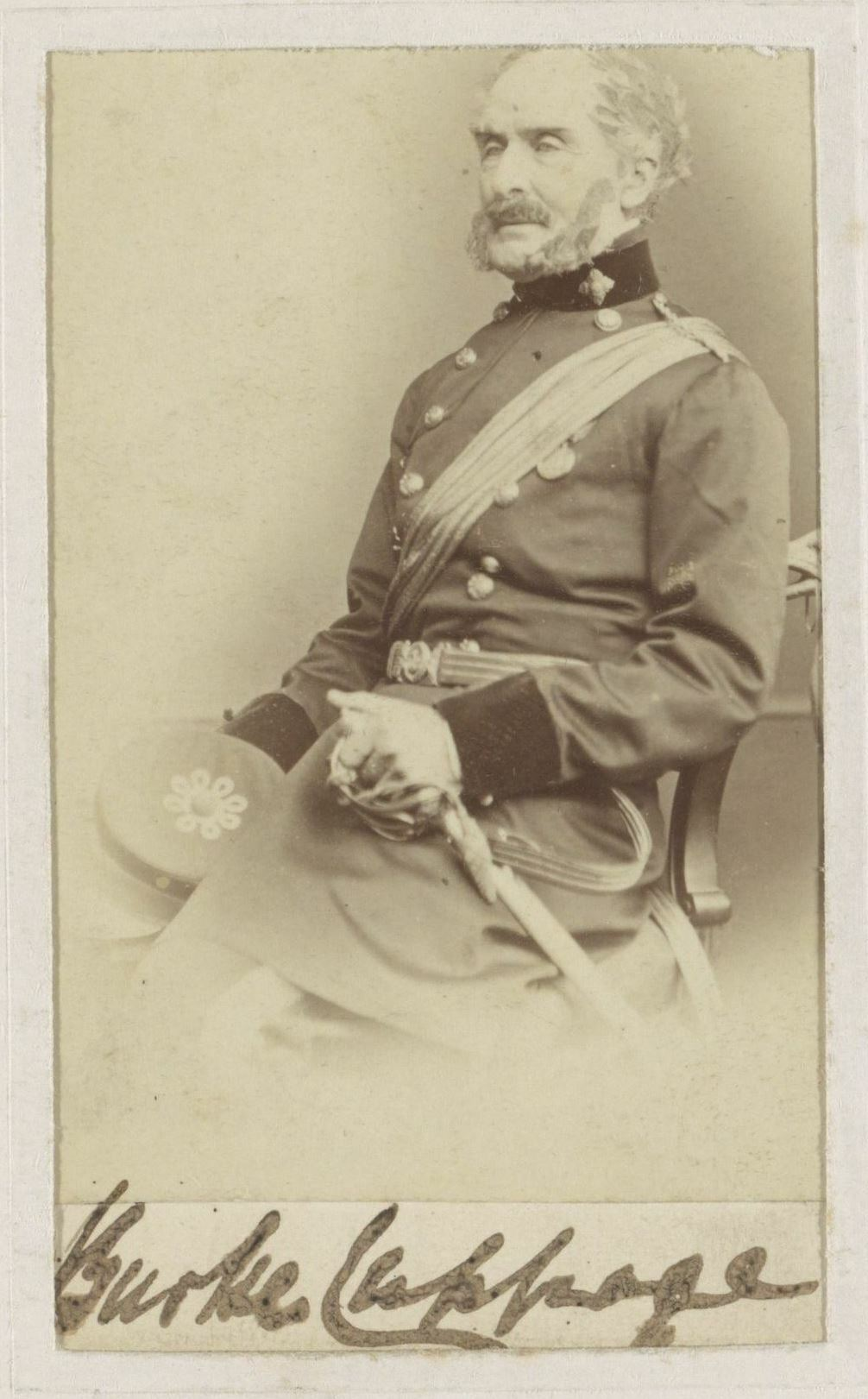
- Autographed photograph of Cuppage (Rijksmuseum)
- Born: 1794; Charlton, Kent, England
- Died: 19 April 1877; Kensington, London, England
- Military career
- Allegiance: United Kingdom
- Branch: British Army
- Service years: 1812–1868
- Rank: Lieutenant-general
- Unit: Royal Artillery
- Conflicts: Napoleonic Wars; Peninsular War; Battle of Bayonne; Hundred Days; Battle of Waterloo

Lieutenant-General Sir Burke Douglas Cuppage KCB (1794 – 19 April 1877) was a British Army officer who became Lieutenant Governor of Jersey.

== Military career ==
Cuppage was commissioned into the Royal Artillery in 1812. He fought in the Peninsular War and at the Battle of Waterloo under the Duke of Wellington. He was appointed Lieutenant Governor of Jersey in 1863 and laid the foundation stone for a new Public Asylum there two years later.

== Family ==
In 1828 he married Emily Anne Fouril; they had a son and two daughters.

Government offices
Preceded by B. Loch; Acting	Lieutenant Governor of Jersey; 1863–1868	Succeeded by Sir Philip Guy
