= William Thornton (British Army officer) =

British Army general (1779–1840)

Lieutenant-General Sir William Thornton KCB

Lieutenant Governor of Jersey
- In office 1830–1835
- Preceded by: Sir Colin Halkett
- Succeeded by: Archibald Campbell

Personal details
- Born: 1779
- Died: 30 March 1840 (aged 60–61) Greenford, London
- Awards: Army Gold Medal

Military service
- Allegiance: United Kingdom
- Branch/service: British Army
- Years of service: 1796–1840
- Rank: Lieutenant-General
- Battles/wars: French Revolutionary Wars; Napoleonic Wars; Anglo-Russian occupation of Naples; Peninsular War; Siege of San Sebastián; Battle of the Bidassoa; Battle of Nivelle; Battle of the Nive; Battle of Bayonne; War of 1812; Battle of Bladensburg (WIA) (POW); Battle of New Orleans (WIA)

Lieutenant-General Sir William Thornton KCB (1779 – 30 March 1840) was a British Army officer who served as Lieutenant Governor of Jersey.

== Early life ==
Thornton was born around 1779, the eldest of two sons born to William Thornton, Esq. of Muff, near Derry, and of Armagh, who died in 1792 at the age of 51, and Anne Thornton, the daughter of Perrott James, Esq. of Magilligan. His younger brother was Robert Innes Thornton (died 1866), a soldier with the 21st Light Dragoons.

Among Thornton's relatives was aunt, Catherine Thornton, who was married to the Hon. and Rev. John Skeffington, third son of Clotworthy Skeffington, 4th Viscount Massereene and Lady Catherine Chichester (daughter of Arthur Chichester, 3rd Earl of Donegall), and Letitia Thornton, who married Daniel Todd, Esq. (the parents of William Thornton-Todd).

== Military career ==
On 31 March 1796, Thornton was commissioned as an ensign in the 89th (The Princess Victoria's) Regiment of Foot. After serving with his regiment in Ireland, he was promoted to lieutenant in the 46th (South Devonshire) Regiment of Foot on 1 March 1797. He became aide-de-camp to Lieutenant-General Sir James Craig early in 1803 and was promoted to captain on 25 June 1803. He accompanied Craig to Malta in July 1805 and to Naples in November 1805 and took part in operations to protect the borders of Naples. He took part in operations to protect the fortress at Messina in February 1806.

Thornton became aide-de-camp to Lieutenant-General Earl Ludlow, commander of the Kent military district in Spring 1806. Promoted to major on 13 November 1806, he transferred to the Royal York Rangers. He served as acting commanding officer of the regiment in Guernsey in Spring 1807 and then became aide-de-camp to Craig in his capacity as Governor General of British North America later in the year. Promoted to be brevet lieutenant-colonel on 28 January 1808, he became inspecting field-officer of militia in Canada in Spring 1808.

Thornton became commanding officer of the 34th (Cumberland) Regiment of Foot in August 1811, commanding officer of the Duke of York's Greek Light Infantry Regiment in January 1812 and assistant military secretary to the commander-in-chief, the Duke of York later that year. In January 1813 he became commanding officer of the 85th Regiment of Foot and saw action during the Peninsular War.

Thornton led the Light Brigade at the Battle of Bladensburg in August 1814. The Americans took him prisoner, but released him in October 1814.

Thornton was then involved in the Battle of New Orleans in January 1815, at which the only British success was on the west bank of the Mississippi River, where Thornton's brigade, comprising the 85th Regiment and a detachment of one hundred sailors from the Royal Navy and one hundred men of the Royal Marines, attacked and overwhelmed the American line.

Promoted to major-general on 27 May 1825, Thornton became Lieutenant Governor of Jersey in 1830. He was promoted further to lieutenant-general on 28 June 1838.

== Personal life ==
Thornton died of suicide on 30 March 1840 (or 6 April), after having suffered from psychological problems attributed to wounds from the War of 1812. Thornton, who died unmarried, left his estates to his nephew, William Todd, who had already inherited Buncrana Castle, County Donegal, from another uncle, Isaac Todd. On inheriting Thornton's estates William Todd took the additional surname of 'Thornton', becoming William Thornton-Todd.

Government offices
Preceded by Sir Colin Halkett	Lieutenant Governor of Jersey; 1830–1835	Succeeded by Archibald Campbell
