= Hugh Gordon (British Army officer) =

British Army general

Lieutenant-General Hugh Gordon
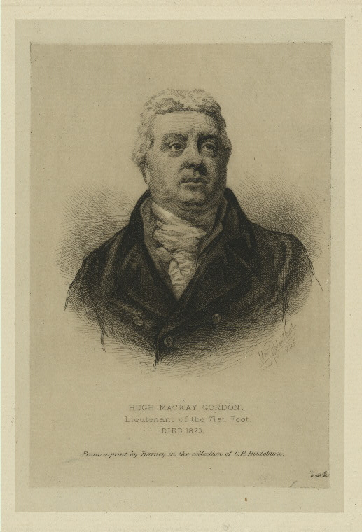
- Born: 1760
- Died: 12 March 1823 (aged 62–63)
- Military career
- Allegiance: United Kingdom
- Branch: British Army
- Service years: 1775–1821
- Rank: Lieutenant-General
- Commands: Garrison of Jersey
- Conflicts: American War of Independence

Lieutenant-General Hugh Mackay Gordon (1760 – 12 March 1823) was a British Army officer who became Lieutenant Governor of Jersey.

== Military career ==
Gordon joined the British Army in 1775 and served in the American War of Independence being taken as a Prisoner of war during the Siege of Pensacola in 1781. He served in the West Indies from 1793 and became Assistant Quartermaster-General in the East Indies in 1798. He was appointed Inspector of militia in Jersey in 1799 and joined the staff in Madeira in 1811. In 1816 he went on to be Lieutenant Governor of Jersey.

He was also Colonel of the 16th (Bedfordshire) Regiment from 1816 to 1823.

There is a memorial to him in St James's Church, Piccadilly.

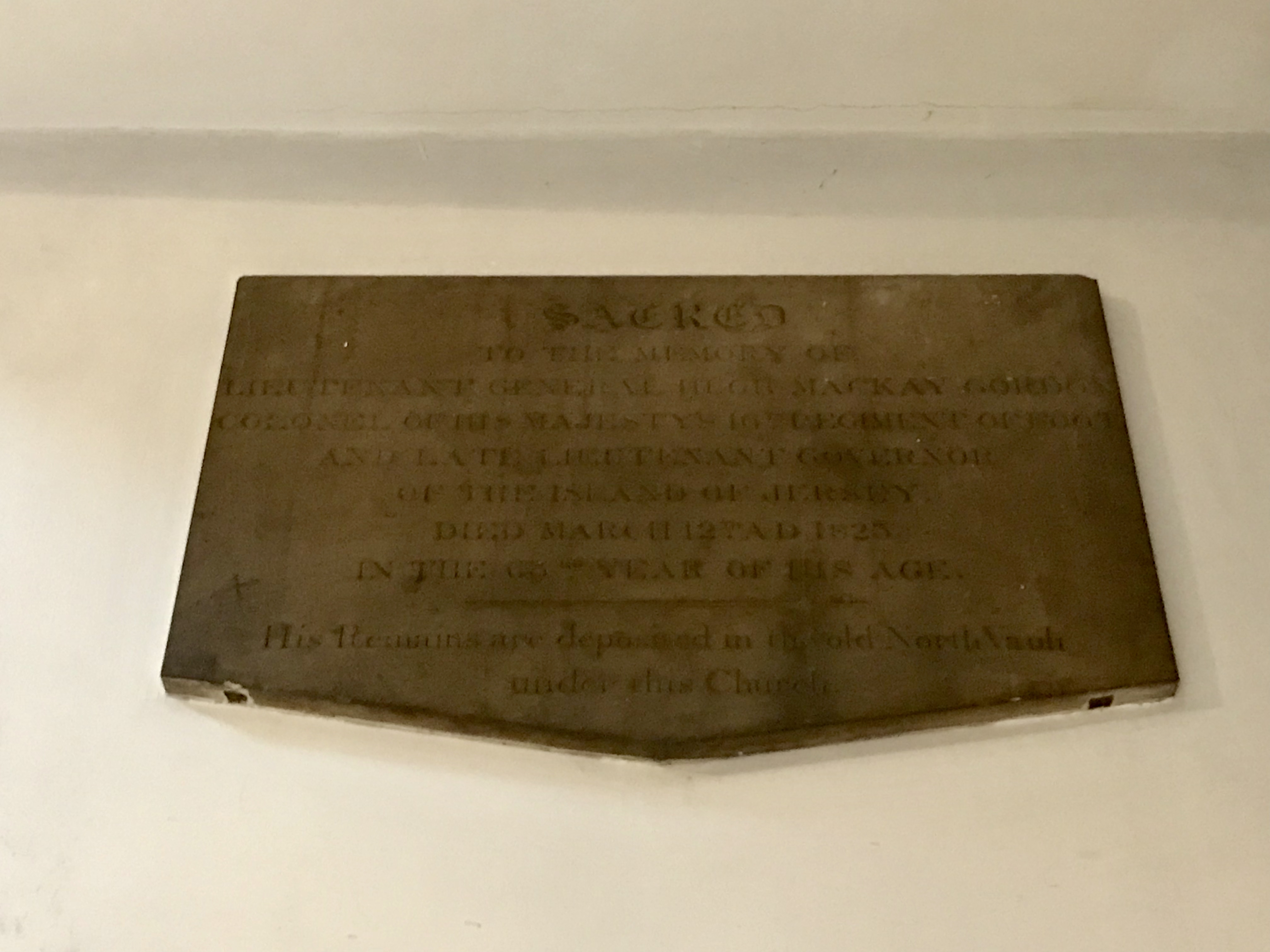
A memorial to Hugh Gordon in St James's Church, Piccadilly.

Government offices
Preceded by Sir Hilgrove Turner	Lieutenant Governor of Jersey; 1816–1821	Succeeded by Sir Colin Halkett
Military offices
Preceded by Sir George Prevost, Bt	Colonel of the 16th (Bedfordshire) Regiment; 1816–1823	Succeeded by William Beresford, 1st Viscount Beresford
