= Archibald Campbell (British Army officer, born 1774) =

Major-General Archibald Campbell CB
- Born: 21 October 1774
- Died: 23 May 1838 (aged 63); Jersey
- Burial place: Parish Church of St Helier
- Military career
- Allegiance: United Kingdom
- Branch: British Army
- Service years: 1794–1838
- Rank: Major-General
- Commands: Siege of Fort Erie
- Conflicts: French Revolutionary Wars; Invasion of the Cape Colony; Battle of Muizenberg; Second Anglo-Maratha War; Siege of Bharatpur (WIA); Napoleonic Wars; Caribbean Campaign; Invasion of Martinique; Peninsular War; Battle of Vitoria; Battle of the Pyrenees; Battle of the Bidassoa; Battle of Nivelle; Battle of Orthez; War of 1812; Siege of Fort Erie
- Awards: Army Gold Medal

Major-General Archibald Campbell CB (21 October 1774 – 23 May 1838) was a British Army officer who served as Lieutenant Governor of Jersey.

== Military career ==
Born the son of Sir James Campbell of Inverneill and a member of the Campbells of Inverneill, Campbell was made a Lieutenant-Colonel in the 6th Regiment of Foot in 1812 and commanded the 1st Bn 6th Foot at the Battle of Vitoria in June 1813. Campbell was appointed Lieutenant Governor of Jersey in 1835 and died in office in 1838. He is buried in the Parish Church of St Helier.

== Family ==
He married Martha Elizabeth Higginson.

Government offices
Preceded by Sir William Thornton	Lieutenant Governor of Jersey; 1835–1838	Succeeded by Sir Edward Gibbs
