= Mont Orgueil =

Castle in Jersey

- Gorey Castle
- St Martin, Jersey
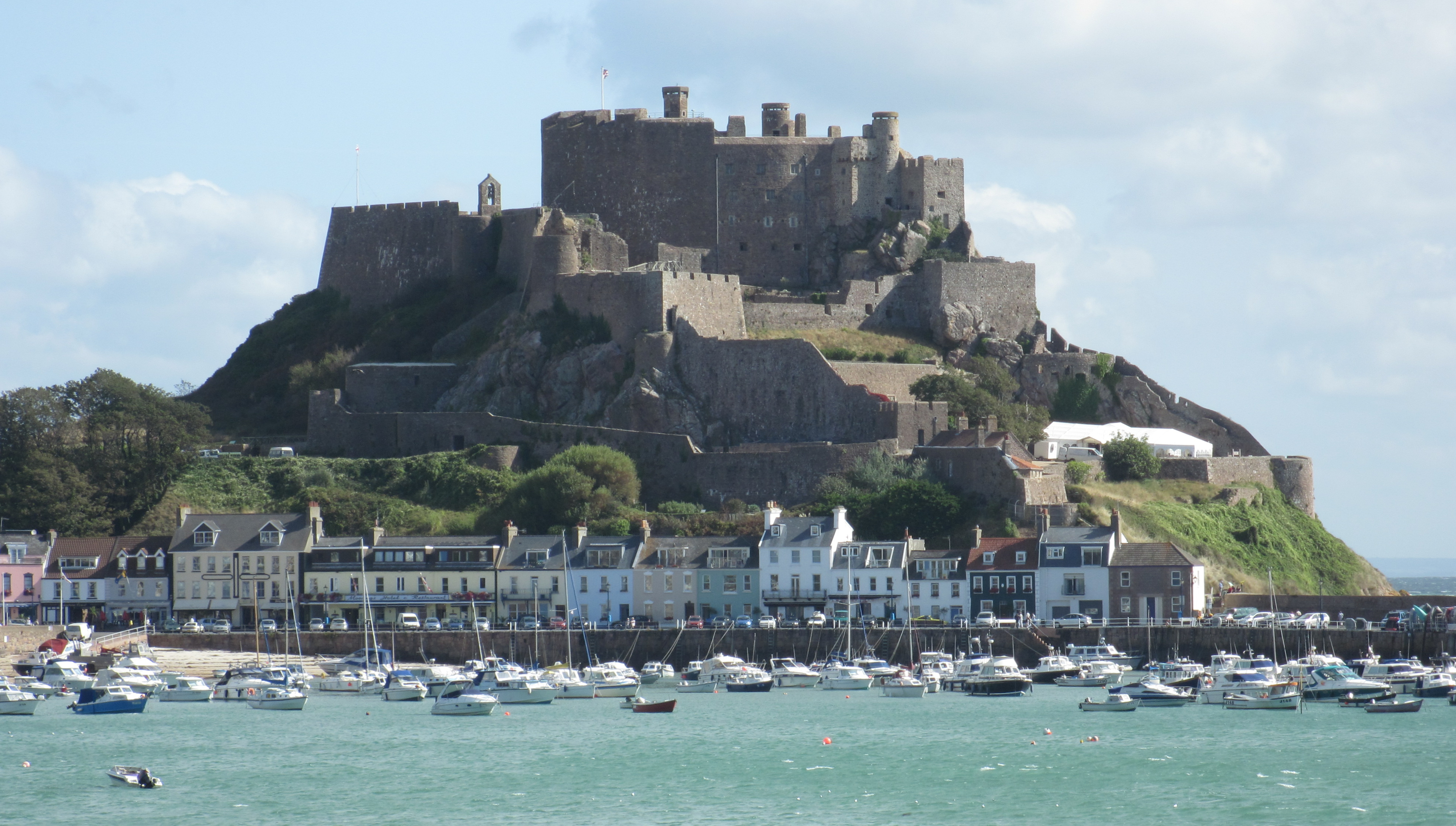
- Mount Orgueil from the south

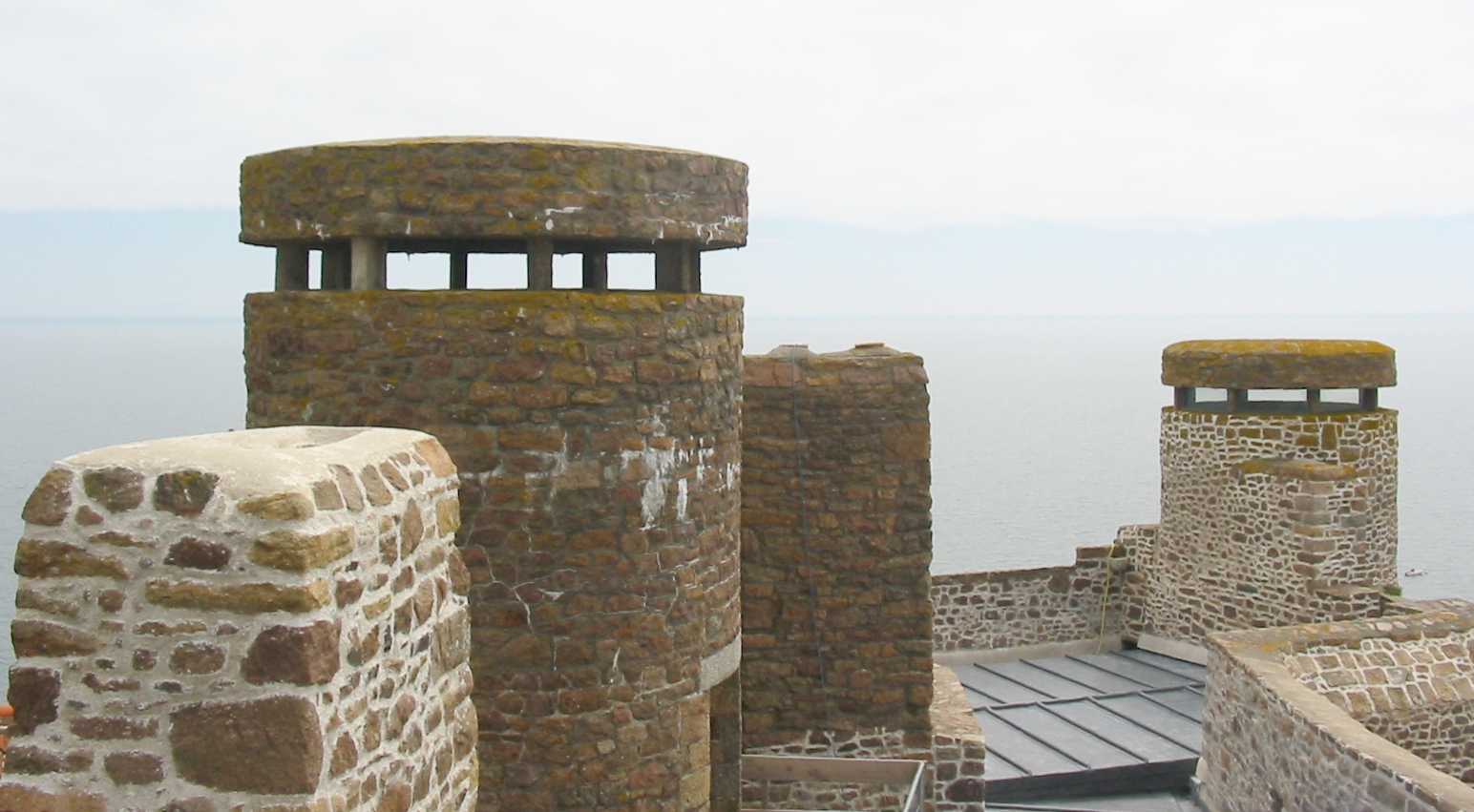
- Second World War German range-finding positions were installed into the existing structure to resemble medieval features in order to avoid detection by Allied reconnaissance.

Site information
- Owner: People of Jersey
- Controlled by: Jersey Heritage Trust
- Open to the public: Yes
- Condition: Intact

Location
- Coordinates: 49.1994°N 2.0194°W

Site history
- Built: 1204–1450
- In use: 1204–1945
- Materials: Granite

Mont Orgueil (French pronunciation: [mɔ̃ ɔʁɡœj]; French for 'Mount Pride') is a castle in Jersey that overlooks the harbour of Gorey; a port on the east coast of the Island. It is known as Gorey Castle by English-speakers, and the "Old Castle" (lé Vièr Châté) by Jèrriais-speakers. The castle was first referred to as 'Mont Orgeuil' in an ordnance survey made in 1462, when the castle was under French occupation in the Late Middle Ages. The castle was the seat of royal authority on Jersey throughout the medieval period and served as the main fortress on the Island until the construction of Elizabeth Castle in 1594. It is classified as a Grade I listed building.

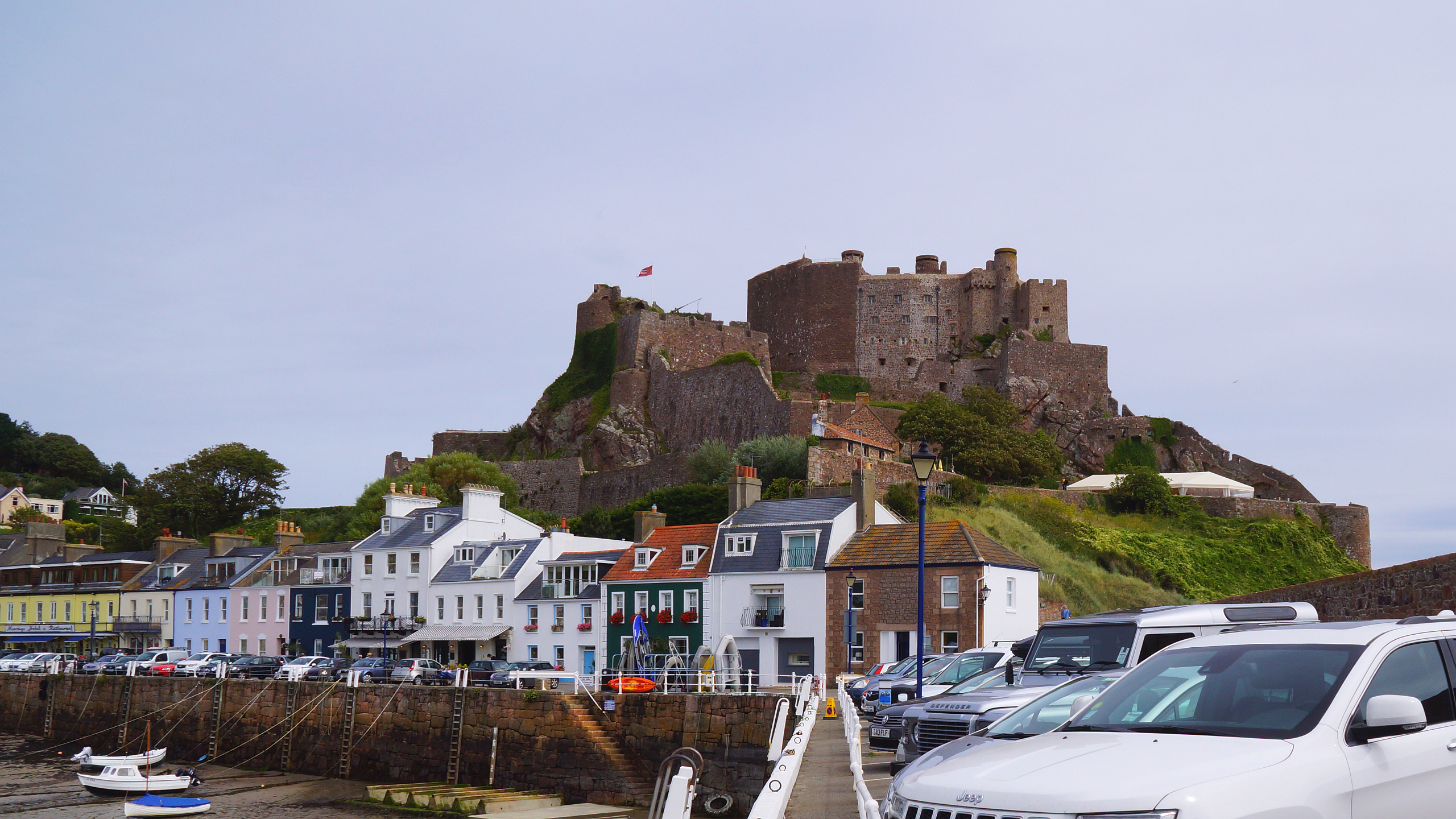
Mont Orguell Castle – view from Gorey quay wall

== Prehistory ==
1970s excavations found that the site had been fortified during the Iron Age, with an earth rampart at the top of the granite rock, that the castle is built on. Other materials were also found at the site, such as arrowheads and pottery, which date from the Neolithic period (4000–2500 BC). This suggests that there was human activity at the site before the erection of the earthwork rampart. These promontory forts are found all across the north of Jersey, as they utilised the natural defensiveness of high cliffs to offer a refuge from raiders.

== Middle Ages ==
Jersey became part of the Duchy of Normandy in 933 when it was granted to the Normans by the French king. The islands were then joined to the Crown of England after Philip II's rapid conquest of Normandy from King John in 1202–1204. The castle was constructed after this conquest, being first mentioned in 1212.

The castle was the primary defence of Jersey for over 400 years and withstood a number of French assaults on the castle, the most notable of which was in July 1373 when the Constable of France, Bertrand du Guesclin, attacked the castle with 2,000 men. Despite breaching the outer walls, the French could not breach the inner walls of Mont Orgueil, as these rested upon a solid mass of granite rock.

The castle was finally taken by a French force in May 1461 by Pierre de Brézé, the Grand Seneschal of Normandy. The castle seems to have been handed over to the French through treachery from the local garrison. Some historians have pointed the finger at Margaret of Anjou, wife of Henry IV, in order to secure military support from her cousin, Louis XI of France for the House of Lancaster during the Wars of the Roses. A sally-port was left open for the French and the English garrison had been plied with alcohol. This suggests the culprit of this betrayal was the Warden of the Isles, Sir John Nanfan, who was a strong supporter of Margaret of Anjou. Despite De Brézé's rapid fall into disgrace and imprisonment later that year with the ascension of Louis XI, the French maintained control of Jersey until it was retaken by a combined English-Jerseyman force led by the Yorkist admiral, Richard Harliston and the Seigneur of St. Ouen, Sir Phillippe de Carteret, in early 1468. It was during this brief period of French rule that the Castle became known as 'Mont Orgueil Castle' rather than its previous anglicised name of 'Gorey Castle'.

== 1500s ==
Mont Orgueil went through an intense period of renovation in the mid-1500s, which was largely a result of the increasing use of cannon in European warfare. The castle was particularly susceptible to cannon fire coming from the hill west of the castle, known as Mont St Nicolas. The Castle was adapted to accommodate artillery; which involved the crenulated embrasures being lowered in height (so the muzzle of a cannon could fit over the battlements) as well as the widening of the battlement walkways. This renovation project was initiated under the direction of Henry Cornish, Lieutenant of the Earl of Hertford. Cornish complained that earlier repairs to the donjon by Robert Raymont had left it so weak it was vulnerable to musket shot; "lyke a nadyl eye scarse abyll to byde a hagboshe." In 1543 he had asked for a "saker" cannon that would cover the sands between "Grovyll" and the castle, where the French had landed in the past.

Other later renovations included the extension of the medieval Keep into a D-shaped bastion (1551), which was suitably strengthened against artillery fire, and a large L-shaped battery, known as the Grand Battery (circa 1560), which faced westward. These extensions were largely in vain, however, and Mont Orgueil was to be superseded by the construction Elizabeth Castle, which was constructed on a small islet near the harbour of St Helier, in 1594. Walter Raleigh, Governor of Jersey in 1600, rejected a plan to demolish the old castle to recycle the stone for the new fortifications, claiming that "'twere pity to cast it down".

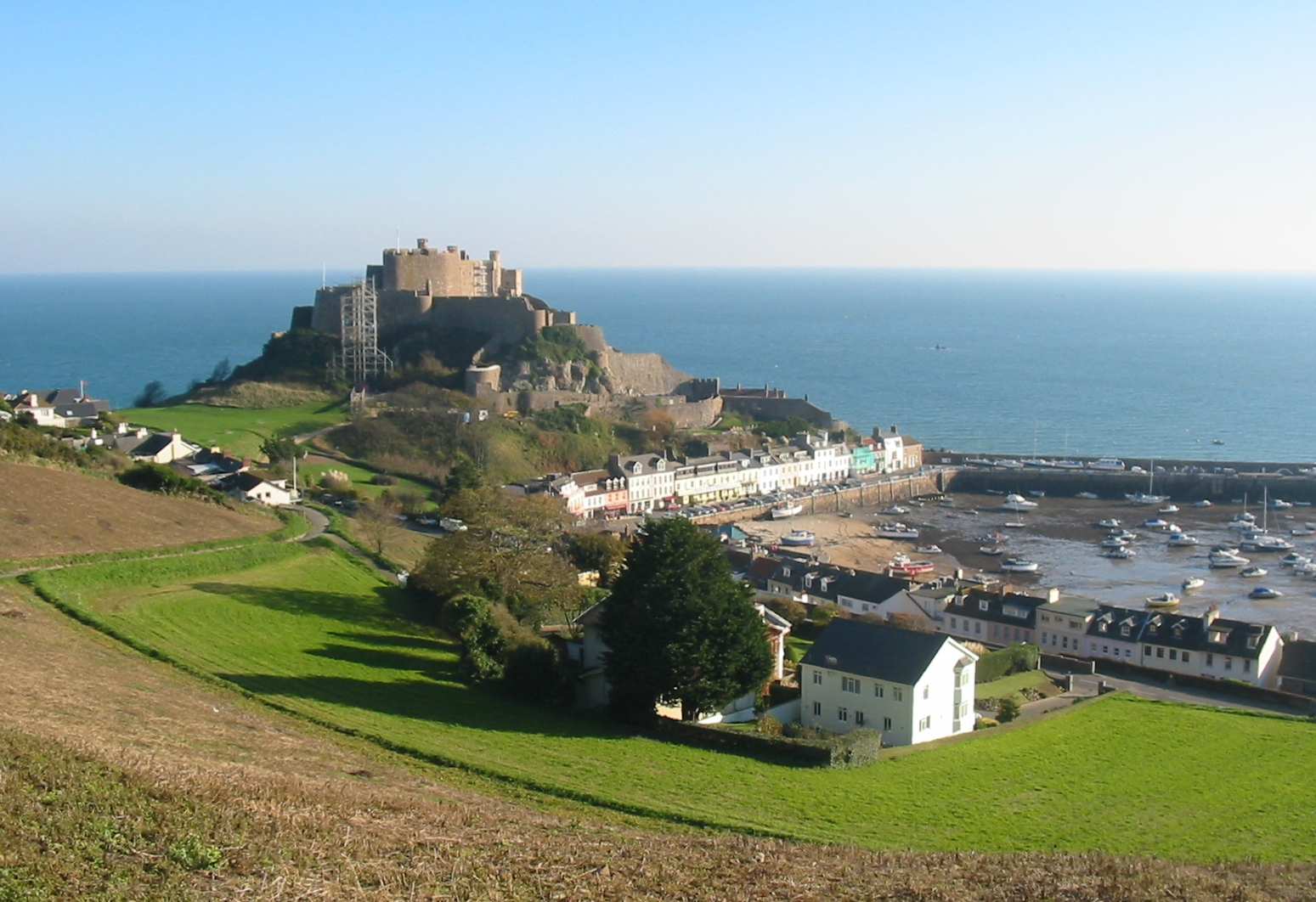
Mont Orgueil (French: Mount Pride) has guarded Jersey's east coast since the 13th century.

== 1600s ==
The 'old castle' operated as the Island's only prison until the construction of a prison at Charing Cross in St Helier at the end of the 17th century. The English Government found it convenient to send troublesome agitators such as William Prynne and John Lilburne to Mont Orgueil, as Jersey law was distinct from English Common Law and lacked a prohibition against arbitrary detention (such as the mainland's Habeas Corpus). The regicides Thomas Waite, Henry Smith, James Temple, Hardress Waller, and Gilbert Millington were also transferred to Mont Orgueil in 1661.

During the English Civil War, the then Lieutenant-Governor and Bailiff of the island, Sir Philippe de Carteret held Elizabeth Castle for the Royalists, leaving his wife Anne de Carteret, and their son Philippe de Carteret to occupy Mont Orgueil. It was from Mont Orgueil that the Royalists under Sir George Carteret retook the island from the Parliamentarian forces in November 1643. The Dean of Jersey, David Bandinel, and his son, Jacques Bandinel, were imprisoned at the castle as they had been leading supporters of the anti-Royalist cause. In February 1645, the two men attempted an escape from the castle, whereby they abseiled out of a window on the seaward side of Mont Orgueil. The makeshift rope did not hold and they both fell to their deaths on the rocks below.

In December 1651, the Island was invaded by the New Model Army, commanded by Colonel James Heane. Colonel Heane landed with 3,000 men (comprising his own regiment), six companies of Sir Hardress Waller's foot and two troops of horse. They defeated the Jersey militia during an engagement on the west of the Island at St Ouen's Bay. Faced with the prospect of a siege by a competent military force, the fortress of Mont Orgueil surrendered with generous terms allowing those inside to go to Elizabeth Castle.

A report for the States of Jersey in 1691 declared that the barracks accommodation was so dilapidated that it was impossible to quarter troops there. Two years later, the castle was stated to be in a ruinous condition and subsequently was abandoned as a prison, because Elizabeth Castle had been built and the castle was neglected and not needed any more.

== Later years ==
Repairs were carried out 1730–1734 and for the rest of the century, parts of the castle were adapted for garrison accommodation. In 1770, the rooms inside the Keep were occupied by officers and soldiers from the Island's garrison. The old Catholic chapel, known as St Mary's Chapel, was converted into a barrack room for 60 men with bedsteads and other fitments installed in the chapel.

The castle was given over to a British naval officer, Philippe d'Auvergne, who was tasked with heading a spy network called 'La Correspondance', which was designed to destabilise the French Revolutionary government in Brittany and Normandy. One such scheme was the importation of forged French Assignat notes into the country, which had the effect of causing hyperinflation, which ravaged the French economy until 1802. In 1800, the Corbelled Tower was fitted out for use by d'Auvergne as his private headquarters.

Over the course of the 19th century, detachments of troops were housed in the castle.

Until the second half of the 19th century, the castle was open to the public on one day a year, Easter Monday, and crowds used to flock from all over the island. This is believed to be a survival of the pre-Reformation custom of visiting St George's Chapel inside the castle on St George's Day.

The castle continued to decay, and due to its generally ruinous state it was handed over to the people of Jersey by the Crown on 28 June 1907. Mont Orgueil has been managed as a museum site since 1929.

During the Second World War German occupation (1940–1945), the castle was occupied by the Germans. Initially a small picket was installed on the top of the Keep and the Gardien of the castle, Captain Joe Dorey, was allowed to stay in his cottage in the Lower Ward. This soon changed when Adolf Hitler ordered that Channel Islands undergo an intensive building programme, aimed at turning the Islands into "an impregnable fortress". In 1941, more troops were billeted inside the castle and the Gardien and his family were evicted. This included elements of the Army Coastal Artillery Regiment 1265, who manned the three observation towers at the top of the Keep, and a small detachment of German Infantry. In July 1944, a makeshift bunker was constructed within the castle; which served as the headquarters for the 1st Battalion of the Army Coastal Artillery.

=== Royal visits ===
In 1846, the castle was visited by Queen Victoria and Prince Albert. The castle has also hosted subsequent royal ceremonies to welcome George V in 1921 and Elizabeth II; inscriptions mark the occasions.

== Present day ==
The heritage site has been managed by the Jersey Heritage Trust since 1994. In the early 21st century, the Trust planned to build a Tudor hall within the castle's keep. Around the same time, a £3 million grant was given to fund restoration work. In 2004, a commemorative Jersey pound note was put into circulation depicting Mont Orgueil. The castle is depicted on the 2010 issue Jersey £50 note. On 2 April 2006, after a long building programme, the castle was reopened to the public by the Lieutenant-Governor of Jersey. Restoration work has opened up previously inaccessible areas of the castle to the public. Newly built additions in modern style have enclosed sections of the castle and made them weatherproof, parts of the structure have been reinterpreted, and artistic interventions in the grounds and structure of the castle have provided attractions for visitors.

== See also ==
- Fort Regent
- Urgull – Hill by the ocean in the Basque city of San Sebastián, Gipuzkoa, Spain
