= Richard Harliston =

Richard Harliston (c. 1425–after 1495), became a yeoman of the king's chamber on the accession of Edward IV. He was made vice-admiral, in which capacity he came to Guernsey.

Harliston was born in Humberstone, Lincolnshire, and brought up in the household of Richard, Duke of York.

== The recapture of Jersey ==
Seven years previously (in 1461), the castle of Mont Orgueil in Jersey had been captured by a French noble, Pierre de Brézé, Grand Seneschal of Normandy, who had since held the eastern half of that island against Philip de Carteret, Seigneur of St Ouen.

In 1468 Edward IV sent Harliston and his fleet to Guernsey, as part of a plan to invade France and recover Normandy. In Guernsey, Harliston learnt that this was a propitious moment to retake Jersey. He accordingly went quietly over to Jersey, secretly interviewed Philippe de Carteret, and immediate action was decided on before the French could get wind of what was to take place.

A body of Yorkist troops came ashore at Plémont, Jersey. A joint English and Jersey force then marched through the night to Mont Orgueil and began a siege of the castle. This lasted 19 weeks, but finally the garrison, which could not be supplied from the sea because of the presence of Harliston's ships, surrendered and returned the fortress and the island to English hands. Upon liberation, the people of Jersey chose Harliston to be their captain-general, but he shortly went back to England.

== Captain in Chief of Jersey ==
A patent dated 13 January 1473 made him captain of the islands of Jersey, Guernsey, Sark and Alderney; he was the first to bear this title of 'Captain in Chief'. Harliston held this office until 1486 and became very popular. In this time he added a tower to the Castle of Mont Orgueil which became the 'Harliston Tower'. It was said that at the time of the fall of Richard III, Harliston had thought to make himself "Lord of the Islands" under the protection of the French and the Duchess, Margaret de Burgundy, but had been prevented by the diligence of the inhabitants, not those who had wanted him for their captain-general, mostly the supporters of Henry Tudor.

By the irony of fate, Harliston was himself besieged in the castle because, faithful to the House of York, he refused to hand over the keys to the emissary of Henry VII. He was forced to capitulate after a siege of six months, and he retired to Flanders.

== Later career ==
He was one of those attainted for joining John de la Pole, 1st Earl of Lincoln in Simnel's rebellion, (Roll of Parliament vi 397–8). On 4 September 1486 a general pardon was granted him. [In the pardon he was described as late of Jersey, esquire, (Materials illustrative of the Reign of Henry V11, ii.30, rolls ser)].

Harliston took refuge with Margaret of Burgundy and in 1495 was one of Perkin Warbeck's supporters who were attainted for landing at Deal in Kent, (Rolls of Parl vi, 504. "late of London Knight". This is the only contemporary mention giving him the Title of "Knight"). He remained in Margaret's service till his death, whereupon she paid for his honourable burial. A probable place of burial was Mechelen in Flanders where Margaret had her court (Hof van Kamerijk).

During the reign of Edward IV, Harliston is mentioned as being excepted from several acts of resumption, and is spoken of as the Yeoman of Our Chamber or Yeoman of Our Corone (ib, v 537. vi 84, 87).

== Descendants ==
His daughter Margaret married Phillip de Carteret (died 1500), grandson of his old ally, and by him had some 21 children.

== Knighthood ==
There is no record of Harliston being knighted, by either Edward IV, Richard III, (late-Duke of York), by the Duchess Margaret, while in exile in Flanders, or by any other European sovereign.

William Arthur Shaw's Knights of England (1906) is an irrefutable reference source – and Harliston is not listed therein. Since Shaw's listings even mention foreign knighthoods bestowed upon English citizens with the sovereign's consent [i.e. Davy Phillipe is mentioned as being dubbed a knight of the Sicilian "Order of The Sword" by Henry VII in 1504], one could, not unreasonably, assume that Shaw's listing is complete. Furthermore, Materials for a History of the Reign of Henry VII from Original Documents preserved in the Public Record Office several times shows transcripts of Crown documents mentioning Harliston, but never once according to him the dignity of knighthood.

It is therefore not unreasonable to conclude from these two sources – deriving as they do from irrefutable contemporary manuscripts in the National Archives – that Harliston was never raised to any order of knighthood by any sovereign ruler. One can only speculate where the Victorian historian Tupper went astray in his assumptions on this matter, later uncritically copied by Balleine in his "History of Jersey", and erroneously continued by the modern Jersey Heritage Trust in their current publicly available information.
