= Willis (surname) =

Willis is a surname of English, Norman French, and Scottish origin. The oldest extant family of the name, the Willes family of Warwickshire, formerly of Newbold Comyn and Fenny Compton, has used the spellings 'Willis,' 'Willys,' and 'Wyllys' and appear in records from 1330. In this case, the name derives from the name de Welles (under which name the family were Lincolnshire noblemen) which comes from the Norman name de Vallibus (meaning 'of the valley'), which in turn was derived from the Vaux family tree. The Vaux family, established in England by Harold de Vaux, a close relative of William the Conqueror, appears in French records from 794. They had held power in their own right and through royal intermarriages.

There are other derivations of the name, including, particularly in Scotland, 'son of William/ Will' (whereby the name has developed from 'Wills', and is similar to 'Wilson' and other related names); because of the popularity of the name 'William' since the Norman conquest, it is clear that by no means are all people with this surname related, even very distantly.

Sources of the name notwithstanding, specific notable Willis families (aside from those in Warwickshire, aforementioned) were of: Halsnead, Lancashire (now in Whiston, Merseyside); Atherfield, on the Isle of Wight (and subsequently of an estate named after it at Woldingham, Surrey); and Monk's Barn, Petersfield, Hampshire. The Willis (later Willis Bund) family were of Wick, Worcestershire, a cadet branch of the Cambridgeshire family from which also came brothers Thomas and Richard Willis (also Willys), each created a baronet, both titles being extinct at the failure of their descendants by 1732. Humphrey Willis, Sheriff of County Donegal and County Fermanagh, was the ancestor of the Willis family of Florencecourt, County Fermanagh, later also of Monmouthshire, of which came the physician and foreign advisor to Japan, William Willis, and the writer Anthony Armstrong (born George Anthony Armstrong Willis); George Willis, who farmed at Florencecourt, discovered the Florencecourt Yew in 1767. Another Humphrey Willis, often conflated with the above Humphrey, was an English soldier and prominent English Civil War clubman, was of a yeomanry/ minor gentry family of Woolavington, Somerset, related on his mother's side to the Pophams of Huntworth.

Notable persons with this surname include:

== A ==
- Adam Willis (footballer) (born 1976), retired English footballer
- Albert Charles Willis (1876–1954), Australian politician
- Albert Sydney Willis (1843–1897), American politician
- Alicia Leigh Willis (born 1978), American actress
- Arthur J. Willis, American college football coach
- Arthur Willis (footballer) (1920–1987), English footballer
- Arthur Willis (athlete) (1893–1979), British athlete and Anglican clergyman
- Arthur Willis Jones III (1986–2025), American professional football player
- Audrey Willis, American politician
- Austin Willis (1917–2004), Canadian actor
- A. M. "Monk" Willis, Jr. Achille Murat Willis, Jr. (1916–2011), chairman, University of North Texas

== B ==
- Bailey Willis (1857–1949), American geologist
- Beth Willis (producer) (born 1978), British television producer
- Betty Willis (artist) (1923–2015), American artist and graphic designer
- Betty Willis (singer) (1941–2018), American singer
- Bill Willis (1921–2007), American footballer
- Bob Willis (1949–2019), English cricketer
- Bobby Willis (1942–1999), British songwriter
- Brayden Willis (born 1999), American football player
- Brenda Willis, American politician
- Browne Willis (1682–1760), English antiquarian and numismatist
- Bruce Willis (born 1955), American actor

== C ==
- Cardis Cardell Willis (1937–2007), American comedian
- Carl Willis (born 1960), American baseball player
- Carl Willis (Australian sportsman) (1893–1930), Australian rules footballer
- Carol Willis (disambiguation), several people
- Carver Willis (born 2002), American football player
- Charles Willis (disambiguation), several people
- Chris Willis (born 1969), American singer
- Christopher Willis (born 1978), Australian-British composer
- Chuck Willis (1928–1958), American blues singer and songwriter
- Connie Willis (born 1945), American science fiction writer
- Craig Willis (announcer) (born 1954), Australian sports announcer

== D ==
- Damion Willis (born 1997), American football player
- Daria Willis, American academic administrator and historian
- Dave Willis (born 1970), American voice actor
- David Willis (disambiguation), several people
- Deborah Willis (disambiguation), several people
- Dinah Willis (born 1945), American model
- Dixie Willis (born 1941), Australian middle-distance runner
- Donald Willis (born 1973), American football player
- Don Willis (1909–1984), American pool hustler
- Dontrelle Willis (born 1982), Major League pitcher for the Detroit Tigers

== E ==
- Eddie Willis (1936–2018), African-American musician
- Edward Willis (disambiguation), several people
- Edwin B. Willis (1893–1963), American film set designer
- Edwin E. Willis (1904–1972), American politician
- Elizabeth Willis (born 1961), American poet
- Ellen Willis (1941–2006), American political essayist
- Eric Willis (1922–1999), Australian politician
- Errick Willis (1896–1967), Canadian politician
- Eva-Jane Willis (born 1984), South Africa-Irish actor

== F ==
- Fani Willis (born 1971), district attorney of Fulton County, Georgia, U.S.
- F. McGrew Willis (1891–1957), American screenwriter
- Felecity Willis (born 1978), Puerto Rican basketball player
- Francis Willis (disambiguation), several people
- Frank Willis (disambiguation), several people
- Fred Willis (1947–2023), retired American football player
- Sir Frederick Willis (British Army officer) (1827–1899), British Army general
- Frederick Smythe Willis (1866–1910), Mayor of Willoughby, New South Wales

== G ==
- Gary Willis (born 1957), American musician
- Geoff Willis (born 1959), Formula One Technical Director (Red Bull)
- George Willis (disambiguation), several people
- Gerald Willis (born 1995), American football player
- Gerald Willis (politician) (1940–2015), American politician
- Gerri Willis (born 1959), CNN news anchor
- Gordon Willis (1931–2014), American cinematographer

== H ==
- Hal Willis (singer) (1933–2015), Canadian country singer
- Harry Graham Willis (1875–1934), English colonial administrator
- Henry Willis (disambiguation), several people
- Henry Parker Willis (1874–1937), American finance expert
- Humphrey Willis, 16th century Anglo-Irish soldier and sheriff of Counties Donegal and Fermanagh

== I ==
- Ike Willis (1955–2026), American vocalist and guitarist
- Inga Willis, American politician

== J ==
- James Willis (disambiguation), several people
- Jason Willis (born 1980), American footballer
- Jerome Willis (1928–2014), British stage and screen actor
- Jim Willis (baseball) (born 1927), American baseball player
- Jimmy Willis (politician), member of the West Virginia House of Delegates
- Jimmy Willis (footballer) (born 1968), English footballer
- John Willis (disambiguation), several people
- Jontavious Willis (born 1996), American country blues musician
- Jordan Willis (American football) (born 1995), American football player
- Judith Willis (born 1935), American biologist
- Julie Willis, Australian architectural historian

== K ==
- Katherine Willis (born 1971), American actress
- Kelly Willis (born 1968), American country music singer/songwriter
- Keith Willis (born 1959), American footballer
- Ken Willis (born 1968), American footballer
- Kevin Willis (born 1962), American professional basketball player
- Khari Willis (born 1996), American football player

== L ==
- Larry Willis (1942–2019), American jazz pianist
- Leo Willis (1890–1952), American actor
- Leslie R. H. Willis (1908–1984), English engineer and archaeologist
- Linda Willis (born 1949), witness during the assassination of President Kennedy

== M ==
- Malcolm B. Willis (1935–2011), English geneticist
- Malik Willis (born 1999), American football player
- Marcus Willis (born 1990), British tennis player
- Mark Willis (disambiguation), several people
- Matt Willis (disambiguation), several people
- Matthew Willis (disambiguation), several people
- Meredith Sue Willis (born 1946), American writer
- Michael Willis (disambiguation), several people
- Michelle Willis (born 1986), American composer

== N ==
- Nathaniel Parker Willis (1806–1867), American author, poet and editor
- Nick Willis (born 1983), New Zealand middle-distance athlete
- Nicola Willis (born 1981), New Zealand politician
- Norman Willis (1933–2014), British TYC General Secretary (1984–93)

== P ==
- Patrick Willis (born 1985), American footballer
- Patrick Willis (judge) (born 1950), American judge
- Paul Willis (disambiguation), several people
- Payton Willis (born 1998), American basketball player in the Israeli Basketball Premier League
- Peter Willis (disambiguation), several people
- Phil Willis (born 1941), British politician
- Phillip Willis (1918–1995), witnessed the assassination of President Kennedy
- Patricia Willis, American novelist of Danger Along the Ohio

== R ==
- Ralph Willis (born 1938), Australian politician
- Ralph Willis (blues musician) (c.1910–1957), American Piedmont blues and country blues singer, guitarist and songwriter
- Ray Willis (born 1982), American footballer
- Raymond E. Willis (1875–1956), US senator from Indiana
- Rex Willis (1924–2000), Welsh rugby union player
- Richard Storrs Willis (1818–1900), American composer
- Richard Willis (spy) (1614–1690), English Civil War spy
- Richard Gardiner Willis (1865–1929), Canadian politician
- Richard Raymond Willis (1876–1968), English Victoria Cross recipient
- Robert Willis (engineer) (1800–1875), English academic, engineer and writer on church architecture
- Robert Willis (priest) (born 1947), dean of Canterbury
- Robert Willis (diplomat) (1868–1921), English diplomat posted in China
- Rosemary Willis (born 1953), witness to the assassination of President Kennedy
- Rumer Willis (born 1988), American actress

== S ==
- Sam Willis (born 1977), British historian
- Sarah Willis (author), American novelist
- Shane Willis (born 1977), Canadian ice hockey player
- Simon Willis (cricketer) (born 1974), English cricketer
- Scott Willis (footballer) (born 1982), English footballer
- Scott Willis (politician) (born 1969 or 1970), New Zealand politician

== T ==
- Ted Willis, Baron Willis (1914–1992), British television dramatist
- Sir Thomas Willys, 1st Baronet (also 'Willis'); brother of Richard Willis (c. 1614–1701)
- Thomas Willis (1621–1675), English doctor and founder of modern neurology
- Tom Willis (footballer) (born 1983), Australian soccer player
- Tom Willis (rugby union, born 1979), New Zealand rugby union player

== V ==
- Vic Willis (1875–1947), American Major League baseball player
- Victor Willis (1951–2026), American singer/songwriter

== W ==
- Walt Willis (1919–1999), Irish science fiction writer
- Walter Willis (disambiguation), several people
- Wesley Willis (1963–2003), Chicago artist and musician
- William Nicholas Willis (1858–1922), Australian politician
- William Willis (physician) (1837–1894), British physician
- William Willis (traveller) (1897–1971), American sailor and adventurer
- William Willis (inventor) (1841–1923), British inventor
- William Willis (mayor) (1794–1870), American politician, mayor of Portland, Maine
- William J. Willis (1932–2012), American physicist
- Wincey Willis (1948–2024), weather forecaster on TV-am in Britain in the 1980s

== Y ==
- Yasin Willis (born 2004), American football player
