= Harry Willis =

Harry Willis may refer to:

- Harry Albert Willis (1904–1972), Canadian politician
- Harry Graham Willis (1875–1943), English administrator in Southern Africa
- Harry Willis (entertainer), Australian musician

== See also ==
- Henry Willis (disambiguation)
- Chuck Willis (Harold Willis, 1928–1958), American singer
- Harry Wills (1889–1958), American boxer
