= Pictures of the Pain =

Pictures of the Pain: Photography and the Assassination of President Kennedy
- Dust jacket (hardcover ed.)
- Author: Richard B. Trask
- Language: English
- Subject: Assassination of John F. Kennedy
- Genre: Non-fiction
- Publisher: Yeoman Press
- Publication date: 1994
- Publication place: United States
- Pages: 638
- ISBN: 0963859501

Pictures of the Pain: Photography and the Assassination of President Kennedy is a 1994 book by Richard B. Trask, an American historian and archivist based in Danvers, Massachusetts. The book compiles more than 350 photographs made by amateur and professional photographers in Dallas, Texas, during the November 1963 assassination of United States President John F. Kennedy, and includes interviews with many of the people who made the images, some of which had never been published prior to the book's release.

Pictures of the Pain was released to favorable reviews, both by critics and by its participants. An abridged version, That Day In Dallas, was published in 1998. The year before, Trask appeared before the Assassination Records Review Board, where he offered prepared comments on the many images compiled for his books.

== History ==
=== Genesis and evolution ===
John F. Kennedy (JFK) was shot dead in 1963, when Richard B. Trask was 16 years old. Trask wrote that he was like most people, unable to understand how "seemingly unremarkable nobody" Lee Harvey Oswald could succeed in assassinating a President of the United States, so Trask set out to learn as much as he could. He found that a photographic study of the assassination was lacking within the many works published on the subject.

Trask began his research in 1983, originally expecting to self-publish a handful of copies for "institutional collections"; his success in finding and interviewing people whose stories had yet to be told led Trask to continue work on a completed book. Rather than add to the volume of works that offered everything from facts to half-truths to outright lies about the assassination, Trask chose to keep his focus on its photographic history. As a result, Pictures of the Pain included many images that had never been published before.

=== Sources ===
==== Amateurs ====
Trask contacted several people who had brought cameras to Dealey Plaza to make their own records of Kennedy's visit to Dallas, including Hugh Betzner, Phil Willis and Robert Croft. He cited the published recollections and testimony of many others, including Abraham Zapruder and Orville Nix.

Willis, his parents, his wife and their two daughters were present when JFK was shot. Willis snapped several photographs of the motorcade from the area of Houston and Main Streets; he and his daughters then ran toward Elm Street, where Willis took a picture from behind the presidential limousine, and then a second picture as a "shot rang out [and] I just flinched". Willis told Trask that, due to his experience with firearms, he knew the sound of a high-powered rifle and that a bullet had struck something. (Note: This picture would come under scrutiny by assassination researchers who noticed a man in a dark suit holding an open umbrella over his head and who suggested that this man was giving a signal of some sort. The House Select Committee on Assassinations identified the man as an insurance salesman who testified that the open umbrella "was sort of a sore spot" within the Kennedy family, representing the perceived appeasement of Nazis by then-Ambassador Joseph P. Kennedy.)

Croft had taken three pictures of the motorcade and was certain he had taken another at the instant Kennedy was shot in the head. When he got his film back from the FBI, the first three exposures were developed but the fourth was blank. Croft said he was told by the FBI that his camera must have malfunctioned.

Navy officer Thomas Atkins was the first-ever motion picture cameraman assigned to the White House; he rode in the first camera car in the motorcade. The first explosion suggested to Atkins that someone had "lit a cherry bomb ... and then immediately following there were two more quick explosions, and my stomach just went into a knot." Looking for something to film, he captured Bill and Gayle Newman lying on the grass, covering their young children. When his car started to leave, he dived head-first into the back seat "or I'd have been left right there."

==== Professionals ====
Several professional photographers and photojournalists were interviewed for Pictures, including Ike Altgens, Henry Burroughs, Clint Grant, Cecil W. Stoughton and Dave Wiegman. Altgens made seven total photographs of the motorcade; the first of two along Elm Street was widely scrutinized after people noticed a man in the doorway of the Texas School Book Depository who appeared to resemble Lee Harvey Oswald. (Note: See Ike Altgens#The man resembling Lee Harvey Oswald.) Altgens told Trask that he had been contacted many times by reporters and researchers, many of whom tried—and failed—to convince him of a conspiracy.

Stoughton, the official White House photographer, also had been approached by researchers and said he was well-read on the subject. Stoughton told Trask that he did not have any strong feelings about a possible conspiracy, except to say that it was hard to believe that one man could have pulled off the assassination.

Grant was the one photographer who was with President John F. Kennedy during the trip from Washington, D.C., to Texas in November, 1963. Seated in Camera Car 2 in the motorcade, Grant was too far back to capture the shooting, but would make a picture of the Newman family before suggesting to his colleagues that they catch up with the presidential limousine, arriving eventually at Parkland Memorial Hospital.

Freelance journalist and photographer Jim Murray had just moved back to Dallas with his family, and was retrieving a personal camera from his vehicle when he heard the gunshots. Murray would make more than a dozen pictures of the aftermath in Dealey Plaza, including a sequence in which a Sheriff's deputy, a uniformed officer and a man wearing a suit are seen inspecting a spot where, according to the officer's testimony, "they found one shot that had hit the turf" near the south curb along Elm Street. In 1993, Murray complained to Trask that the timing and location of these photographs were misinterpreted by "so-called 'researchers' [who] will bend the truth when there's a buck to be made."

That Day In Dallas: Three Photographers Capture On Film the Day President Kennedy Died
- Publication date: 1998
- Pages: 135
- ISBN: 0963859528

=== That Day In Dallas ===
In 1998, Trask published That Day In Dallas: Three Photographers Capture On Film the Day President Kennedy Died. This smaller volume focused on and updated the stories of Altgens, Murray and Stoughton.

== Response ==
In 1997, Trask gave testimony before the Assassination Records Review Board where, in prepared comments, he noted how the many images made during the assassination and compiled within Pictures had been both "used and abused by the government, media and critics." He also hoped to see the Zapruder film donated to the American people due to its value as evidence and as historic record. (Note: In 1999, the Zapruder family donated "copies of the film and color transparencies of each frame, as well as the film’s copyright," to the Sixth Floor Museum at Dealey Plaza.)

Trask's books would be cited in numerous works to follow, including Crossfire and Reclaiming History.

=== Critical response ===
Goodreads called Pictures a major work that created "a broad tapestry of truths and perspectives never before revealed concerning" the assassination of President Kennedy. Choice called the book interesting if "tiresome" in its repetitive presentation of witnesses' recollections, and said the chapter on the history of the Zapruder film "is brilliant and riveting." Dan Rather called it "the definitive book" on the assassination.

For the book's jacket, Stoughton called himself a proud contributor to a "collectible collage [that is] not just another theory." Altgens called Pictures a "powerful display of words and pictures ... a 'must read' chronicle". Warren Commission member Gerald Ford called the book an "invaluable addition" to his library. Sixth Floor Museum curator Gary Mack wrote that Trask had done for the photographic record "what Sylvia Meagher did for the Warren volumes."
