= Ike Altgens =

American photojournalist who captured JFK assassination (1919–1995)

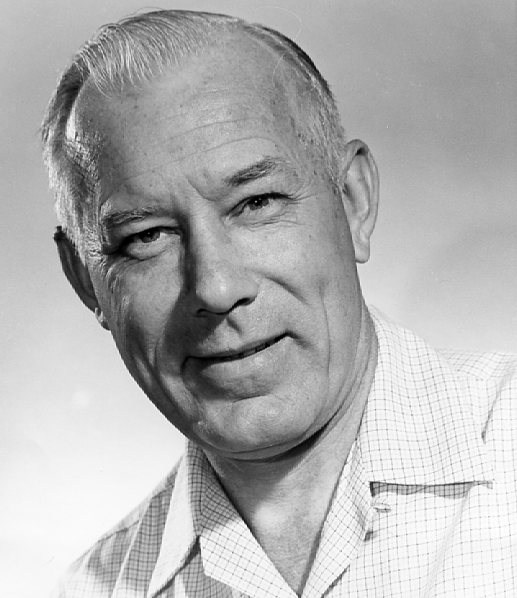
- Ike Altgens, c. 1970
- Born: James William Altgens; April 28, 1919; Dallas, Texas, U.S.
- Died: December 12, 1995 (aged 76); Dallas, Texas, U.S.
- Occupations: Photojournalist; photo editor
- Years active: 1938–1979
- Employer: Associated Press
- Known for: photographer/reporter/witness, assassination of John F. Kennedy
- Spouse: Clara B. Halliburton (m. 1944; their deaths 1995)

James William "Ike" Altgens (/ˈɑːlt.ɡənz/; April 28, 1919 – December 12, 1995) was an American photojournalist, photo editor, and field reporter for the Associated Press (AP) based in Dallas, Texas, who became known for his photographic work during the assassination of United States President John F. Kennedy (JFK). Altgens was 19 when he began his AP career, which was interrupted by military service during World War II. When his service time ended, Altgens returned to Dallas and got married. He soon went back to work for the local AP bureau and eventually earned a position as a senior editor.

Altgens was on assignment for the AP when he captured two historic images on November 22, 1963. The second, showing First Lady Jacqueline Kennedy toward the rear of the presidential limousine and Secret Service agent Clint Hill on its bumper, was reproduced on the front pages of newspapers around the world. Within days, Altgens' preceding photograph became controversial after people began to question whether accused assassin Lee Harvey Oswald was visible in the main doorway of the Texas School Book Depository as the gunshots were fired at JFK.

Altgens appeared briefly as a film actor and model during his 40-year career with the AP, which ended in 1979. He spent his later years working in display advertising, and answering letters and other requests made by assassination researchers. Altgens and his wife Clara died in 1995 at about the same time in their Dallas home. Both had suffered from long illnesses, and police said poisoning by a malfunctioning furnace also may have contributed to their deaths.

== Early life and career ==
Ike Altgens was born James William Altgens on April 28, 1919, in Dallas, Texas, to Willie May Altgens (née Pitchford), a housewife, and J. H. Altgens, a machinist. He had a younger sister, Mary. Altgens was orphaned as a child and raised by a widowed aunt. He was hired by the Associated Press (AP) in 1938 when he was 19, shortly after his graduation from North Dallas High School. Altgens began his career handling various assignments and writing some sports articles. He showed a talent for photography and was assigned in 1940 to work in the wirephoto office.

Altgens' career was interrupted by service in the United States Coast Guard during World War II; he moonlighted as a radio broadcaster during this time. Following his return to Dallas from military service, he married Clara Halliburton in July 1944. Altgens went back to work for the AP in 1945 and was assigned to its news bureau. He also attended night classes at Southern Methodist University, earning a Bachelor of Arts degree in speech with a minor in journalism.

Starting in 1959, Altgens made occasional appearances as an actor and model in motion pictures, television and print advertising. Credited as James Altgens, he played Secretary Lloyd Patterson in the low-budget science fiction film Beyond the Time Barrier (1960); his role included the film's final line of dialogue. Altgens' acting career also included a role as a witness in Free, White and 21 (1963), and as a witness (not as himself) in The Trial of Lee Harvey Oswald (1964).

Altgens photographed President Kennedy for the AP in 1961 at Perrin Air Force Base. Kennedy and his predecessor Dwight D. Eisenhower were traveling to Bonham, Texas, in November to attend the funeral of Sam Rayburn, three-time Speaker of the United States House of Representatives. Earlier that day, Altgens was the only photojournalist to climb to the 29th floor of the Mercantile National Bank Building in Dallas to cover the rescue of a young girl from an elevator fire.

== Assassination of President Kennedy ==
=== In Dealey Plaza ===
On November 22, 1963, Altgens was scheduled to work in the AP offices in Dallas as the wirephoto editor. He instead asked to go to the "triple overpass" (the railroad bridge under which Elm, Main and Commerce Streets converge at the west end of Dealey Plaza) to photograph the motorcade that was to take President Kennedy from Love Field to his scheduled appearance at the Dallas Trade Mart. Altgens was not assigned to work in the field that day, so he took his personal single-lens reflex camera as opposed to the motor-driven equipment normally used for news events.

Altgens' sixth photograph of the motorcade, and his first during the assassination of John F. Kennedy. The Elm Street doorway to the Texas School Book Depository is seen behind the limousine. This area soon became the focus of private research and official investigations. See § The man resembling Lee Harvey Oswald.

Altgens tried to find a good camera angle on the bridge, but uniformed police said it was private property and turned him away, and he moved to a location within the plaza. He began photographing the motorcade on Main Street as the vehicles approached Houston Street, and got a close-up of the presidential limousine as it turned right onto Houston. He then picked up his equipment bag and ran on the grass toward the south curb along Elm Street, stopping across from the Plaza's north colonnade. Altgens heard a loud noise at about the same time as his first photograph from that spot (simultaneous to Zapruder film frame 255), but he did not recall having any reaction since he thought the noise came from a firecracker.

Altgens' seventh photograph, reproduced by newspapers around the world, shows the immediate aftermath of the shooting. Secret Service agent Clint Hill and Jacqueline Kennedy are seen in the foreground.

As Altgens set up for a second photograph along Elm Street, he heard a sound that he recognized as gunfire, and saw that the President had been struck in the head. Altgens later wrote that his camera was focused and ready, "but when JFK's head exploded, sending substance in my direction, I virtually became paralyzed. ... Yet, many news people say I should have taken the picture anyway ... I should have made the picture that I was set up to make. And I didn't do it." Altgens then followed the police who had headed up in the direction of the grassy knoll in an attempt to photograph a shooter.

Altgens recovered, and his next photograph showed the First Lady Jacqueline Kennedy with her hand on the vehicle's trunk lid and Secret Service agent Clint Hill standing on the bumper behind her as the driver, William Greer, had begun to accelerate. This photograph was quickly reproduced on the front pages of newspapers around the world. Mrs. Kennedy testified the following June that she was aware of the image, but had no memory of her actions. Hill later wrote that this picture would forever identify him as the Secret Service agent on the back of the limousine.

After the gunshots ended, Altgens saw several armed men running up the grassy slope between Elm Street and the railroad tracks; he crossed the street toward the activity to see if he could get a picture of anyone being arrested. When they came back without a suspect, Altgens hurried back to the AP wirephoto office in the Dallas Morning News building on Houston Street to file his report and have the film developed. He telephoned the news office, leading to one of the first news bulletins of the shooting:

Dallas, Nov. 22 (AP)–President Kennedy was shot today just as his motorcade left downtown Dallas. Mrs. Kennedy jumped up and grabbed Mr. Kennedy. She cried, "Oh, no!" The motorcade sped on.

Altgens was later called to testify before the Warren Commission. He testified that after Kennedy was shot in the head particles of flesh flew towards him, which "indicated to me that the shot came out of the left side of his head".

=== After the assassination ===
==== Additional assignments ====
Once his pictures had been distributed via the wirephoto network, Altgens was sent to Parkland Memorial Hospital along with a second photographer. Both stayed at Parkland until Kennedy's body was taken to Air Force One, still at Love Field.

Altgens returned to Dealey Plaza to photograph the assassination site for diagramming purposes, then was sent to Dallas City Hall to retrieve the work of another AP photographer who had pictures of accused assassin Lee Harvey Oswald in custody. This was the only time he saw the suspect, and Altgens thought Oswald showed signs of having been thoroughly interrogated.

==== The man resembling Lee Harvey Oswald ====
The man in the doorway of the Texas School Book Depository as seen in Altgens' sixth photograph. Official investigations identified him as depository employee Billy Lovelady.

Ten days after Kennedy was assassinated, the Associated Press in Dallas reported that the first photograph Altgens made along Elm Street had captured the attention of people who noticed that one of the men standing in the main doorway to the book depository appeared to resemble accused killer Lee Harvey Oswald. Those observers raised the question of whether Oswald could have killed Kennedy, saying he would not have been able to get to the doorway from the sixth floor of the building. The report quoted depository superintendent Roy Truly, who said the man in the image was not Oswald but a different employee, Billy Nolan Lovelady. The Federal Bureau of Investigation (FBI) told the AP they had already investigated the photograph and also identified Lovelady.

On May 24, 1964, six months after the shooting, the New York Herald Tribune reported that Altgens—the man responsible for "probably the most controversial photograph of the decade", and one of the few people standing near the presidential limousine when Kennedy was shot—had not been questioned either by the FBI or by the Warren Commission. A newspaper column printed in Chicago's American the following day made the same observation. FBI investigators interviewed Altgens eight days later, on June 2, 1964; he testified before the Warren Commission on July 22. By this time, Altgens was aware of the individual who resembled Oswald; Lovelady had been interviewed for the Herald Tribune article, and Altgens testified that he too had been contacted. He said there was nothing to share because he had not taken part in any assignments involving depository employees.

Commission representatives interviewed several depository workers in an effort to determine the identity of the man in Altgens' photograph; hearings included testimony from five people who said Lovelady was there, and from three others (including Lovelady) who directly identified him in the picture. (Note: Those who saw Lovelady at the doorway: Buell Wesley Frazier, James Jarman, Harold Norman, Sarah Stanton, and William Shelley. Those who identified him in Altgens' photograph: Danny Garcia Arce, Lovelady, and Virginia Baker (Rackley). Shelley, Lovelady's supervisor, also signed a statement given to a man who identified himself as FBI Special Agent Alfred D. Neeley.) Ultimately, the commission decided Oswald was not in the doorway. (Note: Notes from his Dallas police interview placed Oswald on the first floor eating lunch at "about that time (Altgens made the picture)".)

In 1978, the House Select Committee on Assassinations studied several still and motion images, including an enhanced version of the Altgens photograph, in the scope of its investigation. The committee also concluded that Lovelady was the man pictured in the depository doorway.

The official conclusions were still being debated by academics and conspiracy theorists more than 50 years after the assassination. One such theorist, Texas author Jim Marrs, wrote that most researchers were ready to accept Lovelady as the man in Altgens' photograph. He later wrote that others were resisting any such acceptance.

==== Witness to history ====
Altgens was featured in two AP dispatches issued on November 22, 1963. He initially reported hearing two shots, but thought someone had been setting off fireworks. For a November 25 story, Altgens wrote that he did not know the origin of the gunshots until later, but he believed they came from the other side of Elm Street, opposite the presidential limousine from where he was standing.

In 1964, Altgens testified for the Warren Commission and was asked about the gunfire and whether he knew its source. He said he had not been keeping track of the number of gunshots fired in Dealey Plaza because he believed them to be fireworks, but he was certain of at least two. Altgens believed Kennedy's wounds suggested a final shot that came from the vicinity of the book depository building, but he could not say with any certainty.

When CBS television interviewed him in 1967, Altgens said it was obvious to him that the head shot came from behind Kennedy's limousine "because it caused him to bolt forward, dislodging him from this depression in the seat cushion". He added that the commotion in "the knoll area" after the shooting struck him as odd, since he believed the assassin would have needed to move very quickly to get there.

==== Trial of Clay Shaw ====
District Attorney Jim Garrison subpoenaed Altgens to appear in New Orleans, Louisiana for the 1969 trial of businessman Clay Shaw on charges of conspiring to kill Kennedy. A check for US$300 was sent to cover the airfare, but Altgens did not want to go; he thought Garrison was acting in his own self-interest.

Altgens and former Texas Governor John Connally met by chance in Houston a short time later. Connally told Altgens that he also had been called to testify and received airfare, but he decided to cash the check and spend the money. Connally pressed Altgens to spend his as well. Altgens later learned that they were not required to attend.

== Later life ==
In 1979, after 40 years with the AP, Altgens retired rather than accept a transfer to a different bureau. He stayed in Dallas and took a job with the Ford Motor Company working on displays and exhibits. Altgens also spent time answering requests by assassination researchers, and his reminiscences were included in several publications and discussions:

Pictures of the Pain and That Day In Dallas

Starting in 1984, Altgens shared personal details and recollections in letters and telephone conversations for the book Pictures of the Pain: Photography and the Assassination of President Kennedy (1994). His story would be expanded and highlighted for the 1998 follow-up That Day In Dallas. In his correspondence, Altgens said he expected that some controversy over the details of the assassination would always exist, but those researchers who tried to sway him from the Warren Commission's conclusion (that Oswald, acting alone, killed Kennedy) had failed to do so.

Reporters Remember 11-22-63

In November 1993, Altgens took part in Reporters Remember 11-22-63, a panel discussion at Southern Methodist University in Dallas including journalists who shared their experiences from 30 years before. Moderator Hugh Aynesworth introduced Altgens and reminded attendees of the controversy over the man in his picture who resembled Oswald.

Altgens described what he saw following the fatal shot to JFK. "There was no blood on the right-hand side of his face; there was no blood on the front of his face. But there was a tremendous amount of blood on the left-hand side and at the back of the head." This suggested to Altgens that the gunshots came from the rear, because he should have seen some evidence otherwise. He also remembered seeing Jackie Kennedy on the trunk of the limousine, and thinking that she was frightened by the events and was trying to get away.

No More Silence

Altgens shared a story about Billy Lovelady in Larry Sneed's 1998 oral history compendium No More Silence: An Oral History of the Assassination of President Kennedy. Lovelady had contacted Altgens and asked him to deliver a copy of the first photograph along Elm Street. Altgens was met instead by Lovelady's wife, who said her husband would never agree to be interviewed. The couple had moved several times, but they were still being harassed by people who wanted the shirt Lovelady was wearing when Kennedy was shot. (Note: Skeptics of the official conclusions wanted the shirt to compare it with Altgens' photograph. When Lovelady died in January 1979 at age 41, his attorney told United Press International that Lovelady's resemblance to Oswald led to his client being "hounded out of Dallas" by conspiracy theorists, and that 15 years of strain might have contributed to his death.)

Altgens also said he had told FBI agents that he might have had better pictures for investigators if he had been allowed to stay on the overpass. "By being up there, I would have been able to show the sniper."

== Death ==
On December 12, 1995, Ike and Clara Altgens were found dead in separate rooms in their home in Dallas. A Houston Chronicle article quoted a nephew, Dallas attorney Ron Grant, as saying his aunt Clara had been very ill with heart trouble and other health problems, and both of them had long suffered from the flu. Carbon monoxide poisoning from a faulty furnace may also have played a role in their deaths. Altgens was survived by three nephews, and his wife by two sisters.

== See also ==
- Abraham Zapruder
- Clint Grant
- Marie Muchmore
- Mary Moorman
- Orville Nix
- Phillip Willis
