= General Bingham =

General Bingham may refer to:

- Cecil Edward Bingham (1861–1934), British Army major general
- Francis Richard Bingham (1863–1935), British Army major general
- George Bingham, 3rd Earl of Lucan (1800–1888), British Army general
- George Bingham, 5th Earl of Lucan (1860–1949), British Army brigadier general
- Gwen Bingham (born 1959), U.S. Army lieutenant general
- Henry H. Bingham (1841–1912), Union Army brevet brigadier general
