= General Willis =

General Willis may refer to:

- Edward Willis (British Army officer) (1870–1961), British Army major general
- Frederick Willis (British Army officer) (1827–1899), British Army lieutenant general
- George Willis (British Army officer) (1823–1900), British Army general
