= Basketball at the 2015 Island Games =

Basketball

Basketball at the 2015 Island Games was held at the Fort Regent Sports Centre, Saint Helier, Jersey from 28 June to 3 July 2015.

== Medal table ==
Rank	Nation	Gold	Silver	Bronze	Total
1	Gotland	1	0	0	1
1	Saare County	1	0	0	1
3	Bermuda	0	1	0	1
3	Menorca	0	1	0	1
5	Gibraltar	0	0	2	2
Totals (5 entries)		2	2	2	6

== Results ==
Event	Gold	Silver	Bronze
Men	Saare County; Urmas Oja; Indrek Õunpuu; Mario Paiste; Ats Pildre; Siim Pildre; Allar Raamat; Tauno Sellberg; Raigo Sooär; Kristo Teder; Taavi Tõnus; Egert Väinaste	Bermuda; Rye Ahronson; Jamie Cedenio; Jahvon Dean Jones; John Lee; Jason Lowe; Jonathan George Lamar Lowe; Dave Middleton; Sullivan Phillips; Jason Simons; Steven Simons; Kevin Stephens; Husayn Symonds	Gibraltar; Stephen Britto; Sam Buxton; Angel Guerrero Torres; Nathan Nanwani; Roydon Reyes; Aaron Santos; Brandon Sawyer; Jason Schwartz; Jamie Sercombe; Aaron Turner; Andrew John Yates; Thomas Yome
Women	Gotland; Elsa Eriksson; Moa Fredriksson; Linnea Nyman; Johanna Persson; Johanna Pettersson; Charlotte Sjöberg; Elin Sjöberg; Marie Söderberg; Pia Tillaeus Karlström	Menorca; Xenia Casasayas Correro; Pilar Comella Pons; Dulce Dominguez Mejia; Emily Jane Kelly; Serena Mirat Soler; Lorena Orfila Mascaró; Laia Sintes Melià; Marta Taltavull Vilafranca; Marta Tudurí Martí	Gibraltar; Graciella Anthony; Courtney Ferrer; Talia Gilbert; Karla Gomez-Netto; Louise Goncalves; Joelle Grech; Joelle Moreno; Lydia Ouadrassi; Annika Perez; Zainya Reyes; Natalie Rodriguez; Kaira Sene
