= Villis =

Villis is a surname. Notable people with the surname include:

- Marjorie Villis (1891–1981), English actress
- Matt Villis (born 1984), English footballer

== See also ==
- Willis (surname)
