= Robert Willis =

Robert Willis may refer to:

== Sciences and technology ==
- Robert Willis (physician) (1799–1878), 19th century physician, medical historian and librarian
- Robert Willis (engineer) (1800–1875), 19th century engineer, phoneticist, and architectural historian
- Robert Willis (hacker), hacker and comic books writer

== Sports ==
- Robert Watson Willis (1843–1892), 19th century footballer and administrator
- Bobby Willis (footballer) (1901-1974), English footballer
- Bob Willis (footballer) (born 1942), Australian rules footballer
- Bob Willis (1949–2019), English cricketer
- Robert Willis (sailor) (born 1987), American Olympic windsurfer

== Other ==
- Robert Willis (diplomat) (1868–1921), English administrator in China
- Robert Willis (minister) (1785–1865), Canadian minister
- Bob Willis (trade unionist) (1904–1982), British trade union leader
- Bobby Willis (1942–1999), British songwriter
- Robert Willis (priest) (1947–2024), Church of England priest and Dean of Canterbury
