= Photo editor =

Photo editor could refer to:

- Raster graphics editor, a computer program that allows users to create and edit images interactively on a computer screen and save them in one of many raster graphics formats
- Picture editor, a professional who collects, reviews, and chooses photographs or illustrations for publication in alignment with preset guidelines
- a professional engaged in image editing, either digital or photo-chemical photographs, or illustrations.

== See also ==
- Photo manipulation, altering images using a photo editor
- Graphics software, a program or collection of programs that enable a person to create, edit or publish digital imagery
