= Henry Willis (disambiguation) =

Henry Willis (1821–1901) was an English organ builder.

Henry Willis may also refer to:

- Henry Willis (politician) (1860–1950), Australian politician
- Henry Brittan Willis (1810–1884), English painter of landscapes
- Henry Parker Willis (1874–1937), American financial expert
- Henry Willis (cricketer) (1841–1926), English cricketer

== See also ==
- Henry Willis & Sons, British pipe organ building company
- Harry Albert Willis, Canadian politician
