= Mount Bingham =

Hill in Jersey

Mount Bingham South Hill
- Hill
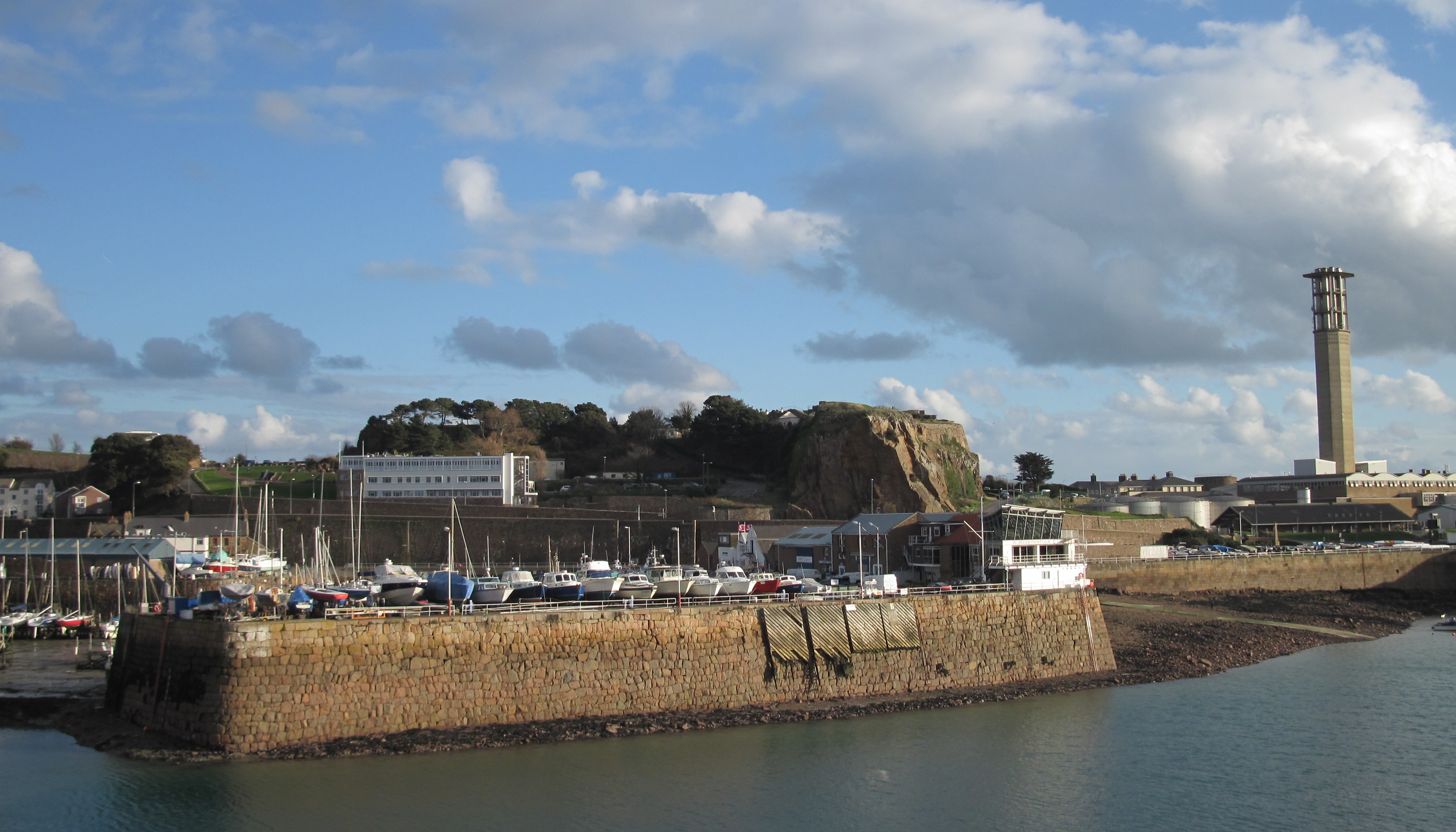
- The view of Mount Bingham from St Helier harbour in 2010, with the offices of the Planning Department in the centre
- Interactive map of Mount Bingham
- Coordinates: 49°10′36″N 2°6′32″W
- Location: St Helier, Jersey

Mount Bingham also known as South Hill is a hill (48 meters; 157 feet) in St. Helier, the capital of the Channel Island of Jersey. It is named after Sir Francis Richard Bingham who served as Lieutenant Governor of Jersey from 1924 until 1929. A road that circles the coastal side of Mount Bingham is known by the same name.

== History ==
During the German occupation of the Channel Islands it was the site of the allied prisoner-of-war camp.

== Geography ==
To the north is Mont de la Ville on which Fort Regent was built between 1806 and 1814. To the south is the Army Reserve garrison of the Jersey Field Squadron, the La Collette Power Station and reclaimed land on which an oil depot, energy from waste plant and recycling center were constructed.

== Land use ==
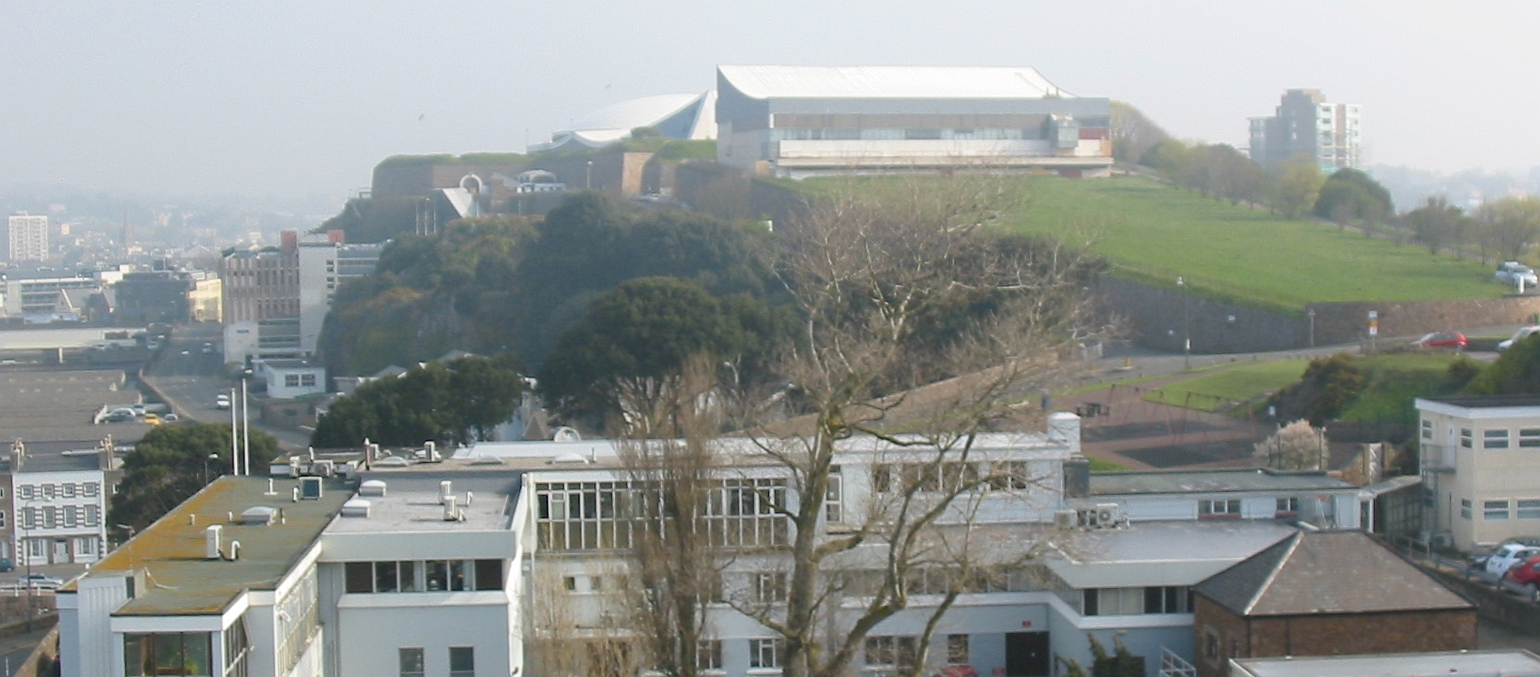
The view from the Planning Department offices at Mount Bingham across to Fort Regent on Mont de la Ville

The area where the prisoner-of-war camp once stood was considered as the location for a skate park. Adjacent to it is an area now used by learner drivers for reversing practice and driving tests. The hill is a location for car hillclimbing rallies.

Grass areas and a small public car park overlook a small children's playground with swings and a slide, with views overlooking Saint Helier Harbour and Saint Aubin's Bay.

On the western side of Mount Bingham, offices that were previously used by the Government of Jersey's Planning Department are being demolished, to be replaced by housing.

On the eastern side is South Hill Gym which was built in around 1860 for use by soldiers garrisoned at Fort Regent. It is now used by a boxing club.

In January 2023 it was the site of a memorial to those that died in the 2022 St Helier explosion.

== Gallery ==
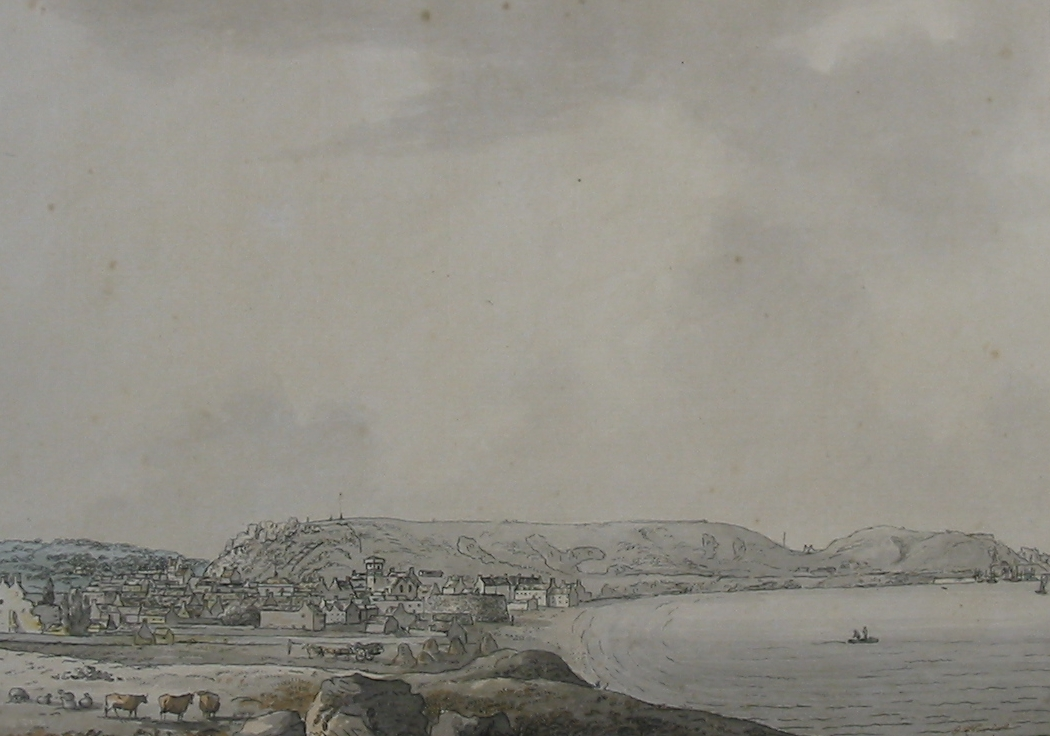
A sketch of St Helier, probably late 18th century, showing Mont de La Ville and Mount Bingham

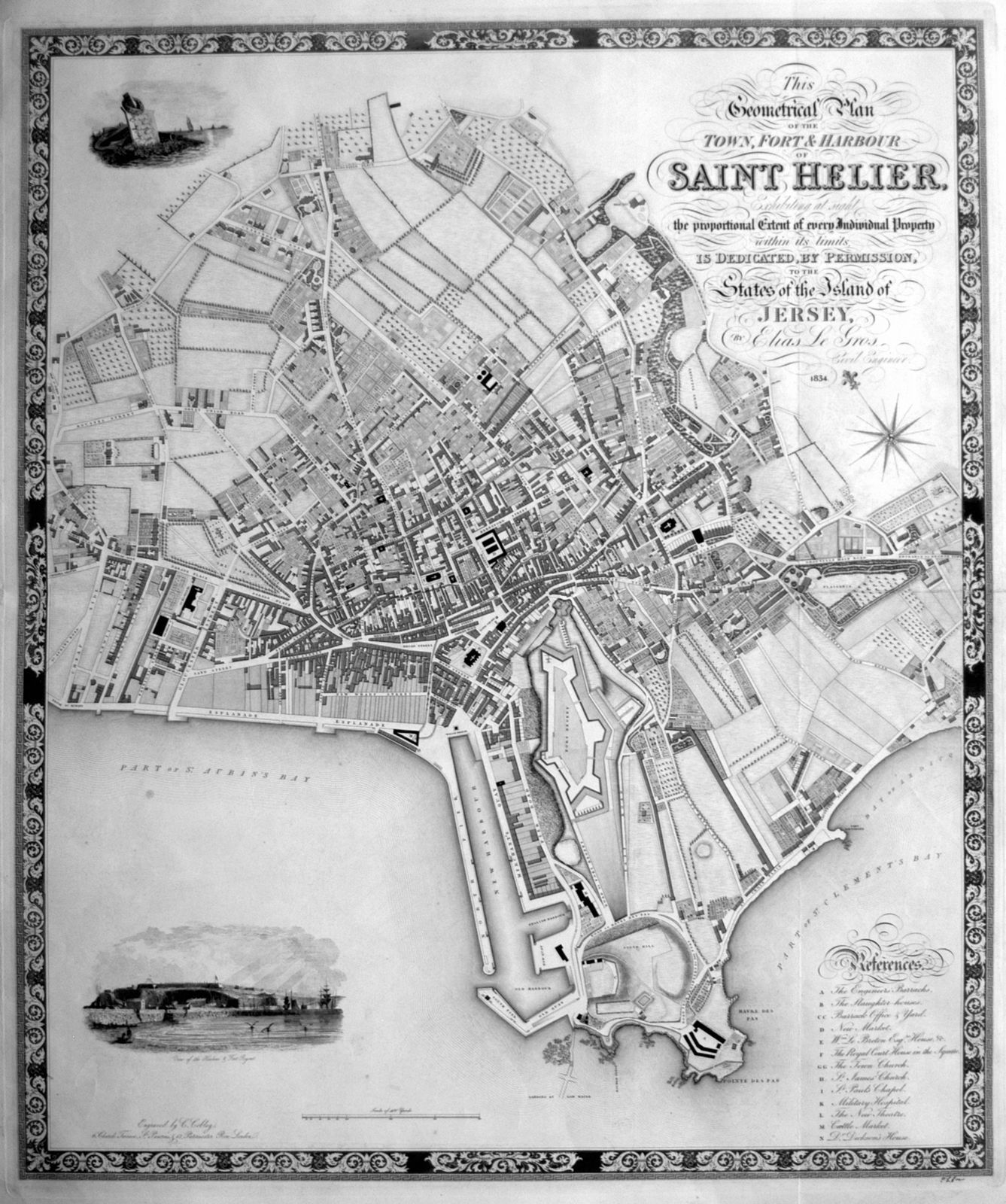
Map of St Helier 1834 showing Mount Bingham (labelled South Hill) at the bottom

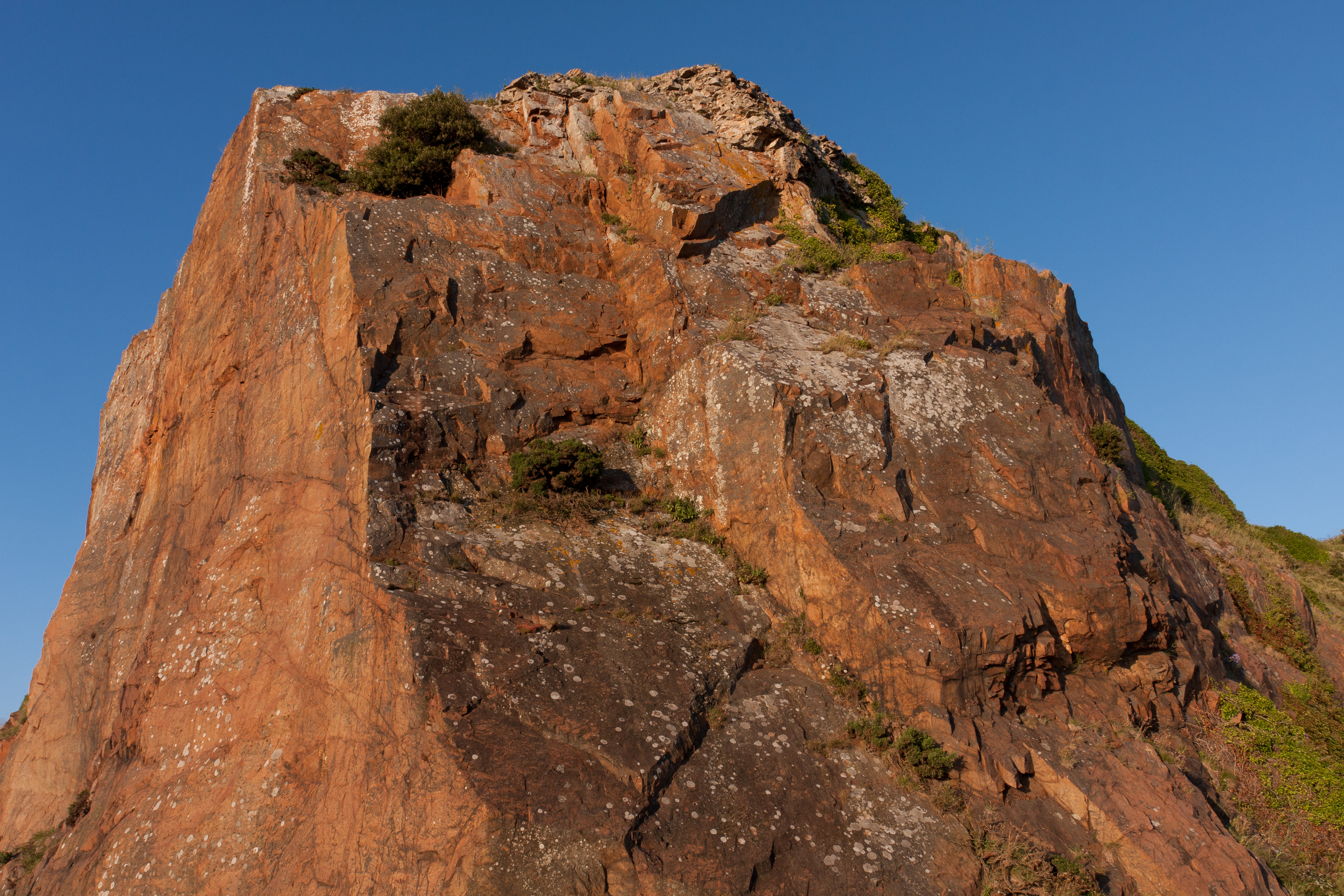
Granophyre at Mount Bingham
