= Danger Along the Ohio =

1997 novel by Patricia Willis

- First edition
- Author: Patricia Willis
- Language: English
- Series: (no series)
- Subject: historical fiction of ohio
- Genre: Historical fiction, Children's literature
- Publisher: Clarion Books
- Publication date: March 17, 1997 (Hardcover); April 1, 1999 (Paperback)
- Publication place: United States
- Pages: 192
- ISBN: 978-0395770443

Danger Along the Ohio is a historical fiction novel written by Patricia Willis and was first published in 1997, in its paperback edition. A hardcover edition was published in 1999, followed by a limited edition library binding that was released in October 1999.

== Synopsis ==
Traveling down the Ohio River in May 1793, thirteen-year-old Amos and his younger siblings, Clara and Jonathan, joined by their cow Queen Anne, are separated from their father during an ambush of the Shawnee Indians. The three children and their cow are swept down the river, and decide that they must make their way back through the wilderness in the direction of the Marietta, Ohio settlement, hoping to find their father there. They find a Native American in the Ohio River. They call him Red Moccasin. Red Moccasin mistrusts them and his condition slows them down, but Amos refuses to leave him behind to die. The children and their cow continue their dangerous journey towards the Marietta Settlement on their own, but they get captured by Red Moccasin's grandfather. Amos is thinking about the Indian Chef Blue Jacket about how he got captured by Indians to stay if they left his siblings go. They finally get to Marietta, and they find their father there. [see notes]

== Major characters in Danger Along the Ohio ==
=== Amos ===
The oldest boy of the family. His brother and sister are Clara and Jonathan. He is the confident and caring one of the rest, the most brave and understanding.

=== Clara ===
The only girl of the family. Her brothers are Amos and Jonathan. She doctors and cares for the family, and is responsible for most of the care and work.

=== Jonathan ===
The youngest boy of the family. His brothers and sisters are Amos and Clara.

== Minor characters ==
=== Father ===
Father of Amos, Clara, and Jonathan. His name is unknown.

=== Mother ===
Amos's, Clara's, and Jonathan's mother. She died giving birth to Jonathan.

=== Red Moccasin ===
He is the Indian that Amos, Clara, and Jonathan found. He is a Shawnee, and his grandfather name is unknown. His Indian name is also unknown. Also he would be dead if not for Amos.

=== Red Moccasin's Grandfather ===
He is Red Moccasin's Grandfather. His name is unknown. He died in a battle.

=== Queen Anne ===
Amos, Clara, and Jonathan's cow. Also if not for the cow the kids would have died many times from hunger.

=== Simon ===
Amos old friend. Amos accidentally killed him with a gun when they were playing a game. It was when Amos [supposed to be not loaded] pulled that trigger and said "Bang, your dead!" The gun was loaded and it hit him in the stomach. It killed him a couple days later.

== Major themes ==
One of Danger Along the Ohio major themes is about how the struggle for land against the newly founded United States of America vs. the Native Americans. Also, one of its major themes is how the Europeans wanted to own land and how the Native Americans wanted people to share their land.

== Reception ==
=== Industry reviews ===
==== Kirkus Reviews ====
Kirkus Reviews said that
...Willis has created a rousing adventure; it will have readers turning the pages and rooting for the spunky Dunn kids all the way.

==== School Library Journal ====
School Library Journal said that
...The author's sturdy plot advances distinctly and chronologically, resulting in pure suspense. She keeps her vocabulary action-oriented and her dialogue straightforward. The young Shawnee's presence raises intriguing philosophical questions regarding the nature of communication and the components of true friendship. After all of this, who could complain about a contrived happy ending?

==== Booklist ====
Booklist said that
...In this fast-paced adventure, Willis successfully re-creates the anti-Indian prejudice of 1795 when white easterners fought to settle Ohio.

=== Awards ===
Danger Along the Ohio has won the following awards...

==== Spur Award for Best Juvenile Fiction ====
Danger Along the Ohio won the Spur Award for Best Juvenile Fiction in 1998.

==== Society of School Librarians International Book Awards ====
Danger Along the Ohio won the 1997 Society of School Librarians International Book Awards for Novel. (Grades K-6)

==== Young Hoosier Book Award [Nominee] ====
Danger Along the Ohio was a nominee for Young Hoosier Book Award
