= George Willis =

George Willis may refer to:

- George Willis (politician) (1903–1987), British Labour MP for Edinburgh constituencies
- George Philip Willis known as Phil Willis (born 1941), British Liberal Democrat MP for Harrogate and Knaresborough
- George Willis (Medal of Honor) (c. 1840–1884), US Navy sailor
- George Willis (physician) (1828–1898), British physician
- George Willis (footballer) (1926–2011), English footballer
- George Willis (British Army officer) (1823–1900), British Army general
- George Rodney Willis (1879–1960), American architect
- George Francis Willis (1880–1932), American millionaire; founded Avondale Estates, Georgia in 1924
- Clarence George Willis (1907–1984), politician in Saskatchewan, Canada
- George A. Willis (born 1954) Australian mathematician
- George B. Willis, American legislator

== See also ==
- George Wyllys (1590–1645), Governor of Connecticut
