= The Barn Burner =

2000 novel by Patricia Willis

- First edition
- Author: Patricia Willis
- Language: English
- Publisher: Clarion Books
- Publication date: April 17, 2000 (hardback); May 1, 2002 (paperback)
- Publication place: United States
- Pages: 208

The Barn Burner is a novel written by Patricia Willis. Its publishing date is for the hardcover edition April 17, 2000. The Paperback edition was published on May 1, 2002.

== Synopsis ==
In 1933 while running from a bad situation at home and suspected of having set fire to a barn, 14-year-old Ross finds haven with a destitute but loving family which helps him make an important decision.

After a family disagreement, Ross Cooper leaves home with only a knapsack and the clothes on his back. He hopes to find work, but job prospects in the 1930s are dim, especially for someone as young and inexperienced as Ross. His troubles worsen after he is spotted fleeing a burning barn in an Ohio town where a number of barns have gone up in flames. Though a kind but destitute family takes Ross in, he yearns to hit the road again, especially when another barn is set afire and he falls under suspicion. But stronger than his wish to leave is his hope to discover the true identity of the barn burner and clear his name. This moving and fast-paced story captures the spirit of determination and hope boys like Ross needed to survive during the Great Depression.

== Awards ==
- Children's Crown Award for Lamplighter award runner up.
- Indiana Young Hoosier Award Nominees 2002-2003 Intermediate (Grades 4-6).
