= James Willis =

James, Jimmy or Jim Willis may refer to:

- James Willis (American football) (born 1972), American football player and defensive coordinator
- James Willis (admiral) (1923–2003), Royal Australian Navy officer
- James Hamlyn Willis (1910–1995), Australian botanist
- Jim Willis (1930s pitcher), Negro leagues baseball player
- Jim Willis (1950s pitcher) (James Gladden Willis, 1927–2026), baseball pitcher
- Jim Willis (footballer) (1891–1980), Australian rules footballer
- Jimmy Willis (footballer) (James Anthony Willis, born 1968), English footballer
- Jimmy Willis (politician), member of the West Virginia House of Representatives
