= Edward Willis =

Edward Willis may refer to:

- Edward Banker Willis (1831–1879), United States military officer during the American Civil War
- Edward Willis (politician) (1835–1891), journalist and political figure in New Brunswick
- Edward Willis (British Army officer) (1870–1961), British Army officer and Lieutenant Governor of Jersey
- Ted Willis, Baron Willis (Edward Henry Willis, 1914–1992), British television dramatist
