= Walter Willis =

Walter Willis, Walt Willis, Wally Willis may refer to:

- Bruce Willis (Walter Bruce Willis, born 1955), American actor
- Walt Willis (1919–1999), Irish science fiction fan and writer
- Walter Michael Willis (1917–1941), American Navy ensign and namesake for the USS Willis
- Walter Willis (director), American film director of A Pair of Hellions
