= Patricia Willis =

American novelist

Patricia Willis is an American author of historical novels for middle-grade readers. She won the Western Writers of America Spur Award for her novel Danger Along the Ohio. She lives in North Canton, Ohio.

== Publications ==
- Danger Along the Ohio
- The Barn Burner
