= Linda Willis =

Witness to the JFK assassination

Linda Kay Willis (born July 29, 1949) was a close witness during the assassination of United States President John F. Kennedy.

When the assassination started, she was located to the left of President Kennedy's presidential limousine on the south side of Elm Street, directly in front of the Texas School Book Depository. In the Zapruder film, she was seen wearing a blue coat and a long gold skirt.

Willis testified to the Warren Commission in 1964 that she remembered hearing three shots, with the last two shots bunched much closer together than the first two shots. Specifically, she also testified that the assassination started when President Kennedy was already waving (his waving motion does not start until Zapruder film frame 174) when she heard the first shot (from Z-165 through Z-208, the president was hidden by a large oak tree from the view of anyone located in the Warren Commission lone snipers lair). Like many Dealey Plaza witnesses, the first shot she remembered hearing sounded like a firecracker to her. She said that this first shot hit President Kennedy because she saw the president immediately (and almost simultaneously) raise up both his arms and clench his fists in front of his throat as a result of the first shot that she remembered. Willis stated that she did not know where the second shot that she remembered hearing came from or went to. She said that it was the third shot that she remembered that hit President Kennedy in his head. In 1978, Willis told the House Select Committee on Assassinations that she "had a distinct impression that the head wound to President Kennedy was a result of a front-to-rear shot" when she saw his head "blow up." In her 1989 video interview for The Men Who Killed Kennedy documentary, Willis stated that when she saw the president's head explode in blood that she saw brain matter come out the back of the president's head, so, the head shot must have been fired from the front of President Kennedy.

Willis stated to assassination researcher and author Richard Trask (Pictures of the Pain 1994) that after the assassination, she and her sister Rosemary also saw someone find a piece of the president's head that had landed in the grass located at least 22 feet (6.7 m) to the left of the president.

After the assassination, Willis, along with her sister, father (Phillip) and mother (Marilyn), were present at the Kodak photographic laboratory getting her father's assassination-related photo slides developed when the Zapruder film was first developed and first shown.

== Sources ==
- Warren Commission; Witness Testimony; Volume 7, Page 498, Linda Kay Willis Testimony
- House Select Committee on Assassinations, Volume 12, Section 2, page 7-8, "Presence of Possible Gunman on the Grassy Knoll", Linda Willis interview
