= Matthew Willis =

Matthew Willis may refer to:

- Matt Willis (born 1983), UK musician
- Matt Willis (American football) (born 1984), American football player
- Matt Willis (1913–1989), American actor, known for The Return of the Vampire and other early movies
