= Frank Willis =

Frank Willis may refer to:

- Frank B. Willis (1871–1928), American politician
- Frank Willis (canoeist) (1915–1991), Canadian canoeist

== See also ==
- Francis Willis (disambiguation)
