= Francis Willis =

Francis Willis may refer to:

- Francis Willis (academic) (died 1597), English academic administrator at the University of Oxford and Dean of Worcester
- Francis Willis (physician) (1718–1807), British physician and clergyman, known for his treatment of George III
- Francis Willis (politician) (1745–1829), United States representative from Georgia

== See also ==
- Frank Willis (disambiguation)
- Frances E. Willis (1899–1983), third woman to enter the U.S. Foreign Service
