= George Willis (physician) =

British politician (1828–1898)

- Born: 1828; County Cavan, Ireland
- Died: 1898; Monmouth, Wales
- Education: University of Glasgow
- Occupations: Physician, local politician
- Relatives: William Willis (brother)

George Willis (1828–1898) was a British physician and local politician known for advancing community healthcare in mid‑19th century Monmouth, Wales. A graduate of the University of Glasgow, he co‑founded the Cottage Hospital in Monmouth and served multiple terms as mayor, blending medical innovation with civic leadership.

== Early life ==
Willis was born in County Cavan, Ireland. He earned his medical degree at the University of Glasgow in 1850.

He was the elder brother of Dr. William Willis who taught medicine at the University of Tokyo and founded the medical school at the University of Kagoshima. or Kagoshima University

== Career ==
After earning his medical degree from the University of Glasgow in 1850, Willis began his medical practice in County Cavan, where he developed a reputation for innovative patient care and a compassionate approach to healthcare. Recognizing the critical need for improved local services, he co‑founded the Cottage Hospital in Monmouth in 1855. The hospital introduced progressive, community‑based treatment methods that significantly reduced the impact of infectious diseases in the region.

In addition to his medical achievements, Willis was actively involved in local governance. Elected as mayor of Monmouth on several occasions, he implemented public health reforms that improved sanitation, established regular health inspections, and enhanced community infrastructure for better health outcomes.

Willis's dual legacy in medicine and public service not only transformed community healthcare practices during his time but also laid the groundwork for subsequent advances in both fields.
