= Francis Bingham =

British Army general (1863–1935)

Major-General The Honourable Sir Francis Bingham KCB KCMG JP
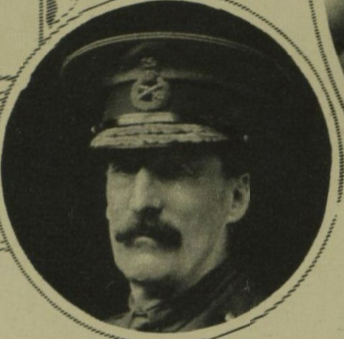
- Born: 5 July 1863
- Died: 5 November 1935 (aged 72); London
- Spouse(s): Kathleen Clarke (m. 1896); 1 child
- Relatives: Sir Cecil Bingham (brother)
- Military career
- Allegiance: United Kingdom
- Branch: British Army
- Service years: 1883–1929
- Rank: Major-General
- Conflicts: World War I
- Awards: Knight Commander of the Order of the Bath; Knight Commander of the Order of St Michael and St George

Major-General Sir Francis Richard Bingham, KCB, KCMG, JP (5 July 1863 – 5 November 1935) was a British Army officer who became Lieutenant Governor of Jersey.

== Military career ==
Bingham was a younger son of Charles Bingham, 4th Earl of Lucan (1830–1914) by his wife Lady Cecilia Catherine Gordon-Lennox (1838–1919), daughter of the 5th Duke of Richmond.

He was commissioned into the Royal Artillery as a lieutenant on 28 July 1883, and was appointed Aide-de-camp to the General Officer Commanding 3rd Infantry Brigade at Aldershot in 1889. Promoted to captain on 15 August 1892, he was attached to the Egyptian Army in 1893.

He became aide-de-camp to the commander-in-chief, Madras, later that year, and then Adjutant to the Prince of Wales's Own Norfolk Artillery (Eastern Division) on 16 February 1899. He was promoted to the rank of major on 13 February 1900, upon augmentation when he was from April 1900 appointed in charge of the new 125th Battery Royal Field Artillery stationed at Fermoy Barracks. In 1911 he became Chief Instructor at the School of Gunnery.

He served in World War I as deputy director of Artillery at the War Office and then as a Member of Ministry of Munitions Council. He was appointed a Companion of the Order of the Bath (CB) in the 1915 Birthday Honours. He was appointed a Knight Commander of the Order of St Michael and St George (KCMG) in the 1918 New Year Honours and promoted to Knight Commander of the Order of the Bath (KCB) in the 1924 Birthday Honours.

After the War he became Chief of the British Section and President of Sub-Commission for Armaments and Material for the Military Inter-Allied Commission of Control in Germany. He became Lieutenant Governor of Jersey in 1924 and retired 1929. He was awarded a gold watch and cheque in appreciation of his service.

In retirement he served from 18 September 1931 as colonel commandant of the Royal Artillery and became a justice of the peace in Buckinghamshire.

== Personal life ==
In 1896 he married Kathleen Clarke; the couple had one child. Kathleen, Lady Bingham, died on 18 September 1963. Bingham was chairman of Our Dumb Friends' League. He resigned in 1930. He opened a dog cemetery in Jersey.

He died in a London nursing home in 1935, aged 72.

== See also ==
- Mount Bingham

Government offices
Preceded by Sir William Smith	Lieutenant Governor of Jersey; 1924–1929	Succeeded by Edward Willis
