= Judith Willis =

American biologist

Judith H. Willis (born January 2, 1935) is an American biologist and professor emeritus at the University of Georgia, known for her work on insect cuticular proteins.

== Life and career ==
Willis received a B.A. in zoology from Cornell University in 1956, later receiving an M.A. in 1957 and a PhD in 1961 from Harvard University. After completing her PhD, she was awarded a postdoctoral research fellowship from the U.S. Public Health Service to work at Oxford University.

In 1963, she became an instructor at University of Illinois Urbana-Champaign in the entomology department. She became a professor in 1977 and professor emerita in 1991. In 1990, Willis moved to the University of Georgia to become head of the zoology department. She later served as a professor of cellular biology and an adjunct scientist in entomology.

Willis was member of the editorial boards of the Journal of Insect Physiology and Insect Biochemistry and Molecular Biology.

She is currently Professor Emeritus at University of Georgia and fellow of the American Association for the Advancement of Science. Her research frequently involved insect cuticular proteins (CPs) as molecular markers of metamorphic stage, precise role CPs play in constructing insects and annotating the CP genes of Anopheles gambiae, the major vector of malaria.

== Selected publications ==
- Willis, J.H. 2018 The evolution and metamorphosis of arthropod proteomics and genomics. Ann. Rev. Entomol. 63:1-13.
- Vannini, L. and J.H. Willis 2016. Immunolocalization of cuticular proteins in Johnston's organ and the corneal lens of Anopheles gambiae. Arthropod Structure & Develop. 45:519-535.
- Ioannidou, Z S., Theodoropoulou, M.C., Papandreou, N.C., Willis, J.H., Hamodrakas, S.J. 2014. CutProtFam-Pred: Detection and classification of putative structural cuticular proteins from sequence alone, based on profile Hidden Markov Models. Insect Biochem. Molec. Biol. 52:51-59.
- Cornman, R.S., T. Togawa, W.A. Dunn. N. He, A.C. Emmons, J.H. Willis. 2008. Annotation and analysis of a large cuticular protein family with the R&R Consensus in Anopheles gambiae. BMC Genomics 9:22.
- Iconomidou, V.A., J.H. Willis and S.J. Hamodrakas. 2005. Unique features of the structural model of ‘hard’ cuticle proteins: implications for chitin-protein interactions and cross-linking in cuticle. Insect Biochem. Molec. Biol. 35:553-560.
- Dotson, E.M., A.J. Cornel, J.H. Willis and F.H. Collins. 1998. A family of pupal-specific cuticular protein genes in the mosquito Anopheles gambiae. Insect. Biochem. Molec. Biol. 28: 459-472.
- Willis, J.H. 1986. The paradigm of stage specific gene sets in insect metamorphosis: Time for revision! Arch. Insect Biochem. Physiol. Suppl. 1:47-57.
