= Charles Willis =

Charles Willis may refer to:

- Charles Willis (cricketer) (1827–1895), English amateur cricketer
- Charles T. Willis (1841–1921), New York politician
- Charles Willis, pseudonym of Arthur C. Clarke (1917–2008), British science and science fiction author
- Charles F. Willis (1918–1993), naval aviator, airline founder, president of Alaska Airlines and co-founder of Citizens for Eisenhower
- Charles Willis, one of The Willis Brothers, a country music ensemble

== See also ==
- Chuck Willis (1926–1958), American singer and songwriter
