= Carol Willis =

Carol Willis may refer to:

- Carol Willis (architectural historian), founding director of the Skyscraper Museum, and professor of urban studies and planning at Columbia University
- Carol Willis (model), American model
