= Fort Regent =

Fort, used as a leisure centre, in Jersey, Channel Islands

- Saint Helier, Jersey
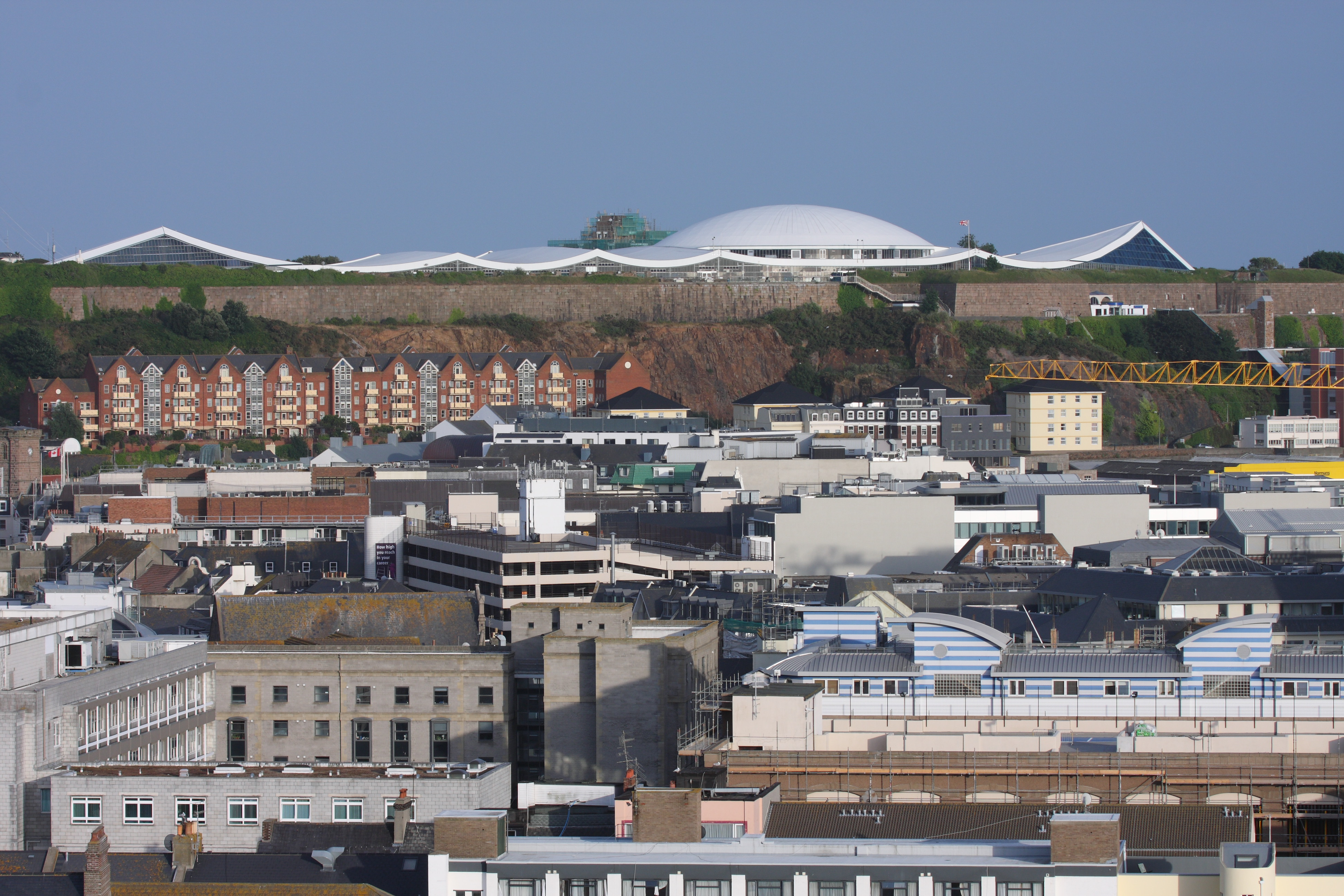
- Fort Regent in 2008.

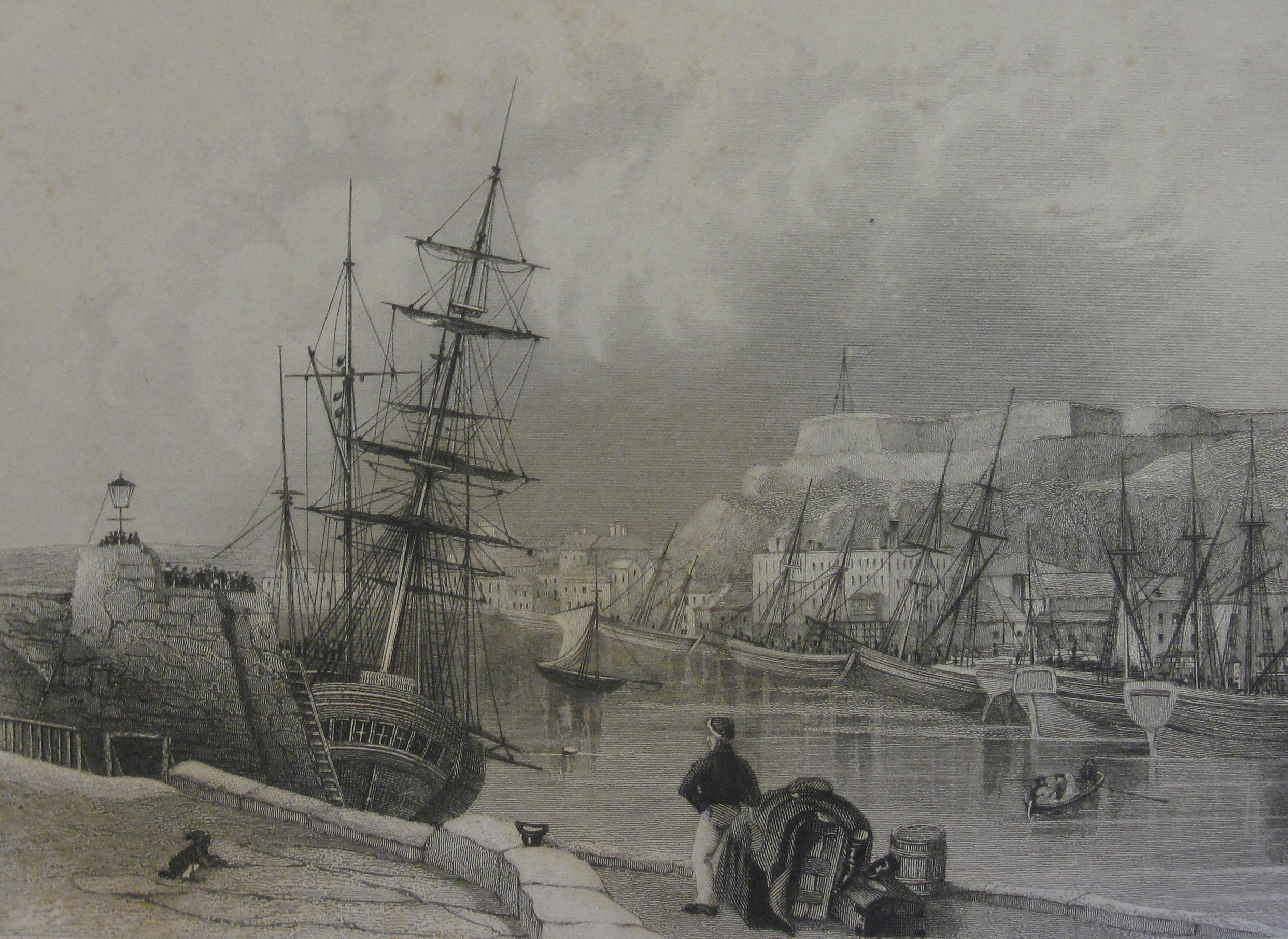
- Fort Regent in the 19th century.

Site information
- Type: Fortification
- Owner: People of Jersey
- Controlled by: States of Jersey
- Open to the public: Yes
- Condition: Intact

Location
- Coordinates: 49.1813°N 2.1059°W

Site history
- Built: 1806 to 1814
- Materials: Granite; Carboniferous limestone

Garrison information
- Garrison: British Army; Jersey Militia; Wehrmacht (1940–1945)

Fort Regent is a 19th-century fortification and leisure centre on Mont de la Ville (Town Hill), in St. Helier, Jersey. The fort is in close proximity to the fortified South Hill Engineers Barracks at La Collette and overlooks the 16th-century Elizabeth Castle and harbour to the west.

The fort's main features are substantial curtain walls, ditches, a glacis, redoubts, bastions, and redans (or demi-bastions). A parade ground was in the centre, which is now built upon and covered with a roof.

== Pre-history of Le Mont de la Ville ==
A dolmen was located on the hill, prior to the construction of Fort Regent, and unknown prior to 1785. In 1785, workmen, who were leveling the area for use as a parade ground uncovered the dolmen. The dolmen was gifted to Field Marshal Henry Seymour Conway, Governor of Jersey (1772–1795), who removed and brought it to his home in 1788, Park Place, near Henley-on-Thames.

== Middle Ages and 16th century ==
During the Middle Ages, the Town Hill, and the nearby Petit Mont de la Ville, were used as common land. The Chapel of Notre Dame des Pas was situated at the foot of the hill during this period, but it was demolished by the Board of Ordnance in 1814.

In 1550, Edward VI ordered the town to be relocated onto the hill as it would be easier to defend from that position however, the town was never moved.

In 1591, an intention to fortify the hill arose in the form of consent, from the Procureurs of the Vingtaine, to acquire the common land from the people, with their consent, so that fortifications could be constructed. The document referred to letters from Elizabeth I promising to fortify the top of the hill to provide defence for the town. Despite this, no evidence exists of any work being carried out during the 16th century.

== 17th century ==
In October 1651, during the Third English Civil War, the Parliamentarian Colonel James Heane, besieged Elizabeth Castle by firing explosive shells with mortars located on high ground between Town Hill and South Hill. This bombardment forced the eventual surrender of George Carteret, at Elizabeth Castle, in December 1651.

== 18th century ==
An illustration by J. Heath, dated 1757, shows the first signs of fortification on the Town Hill, in form of lines, possibly earthworks rather than stone walls. A map based on a survey carried out in 1787, under the order of the Duke of Richmond, supports this possibility.

A later map produced by James Stead, known as the Bouillon Map of 1799, indicates that the main citadel, at this time, was located on South Hill, rather than Town Hill.

The hill was used in 1781, during the Battle of Jersey, by the 78th Regiment of Foot as a suitable position to prevent the retreat of the invading French Army.

== 19th century ==
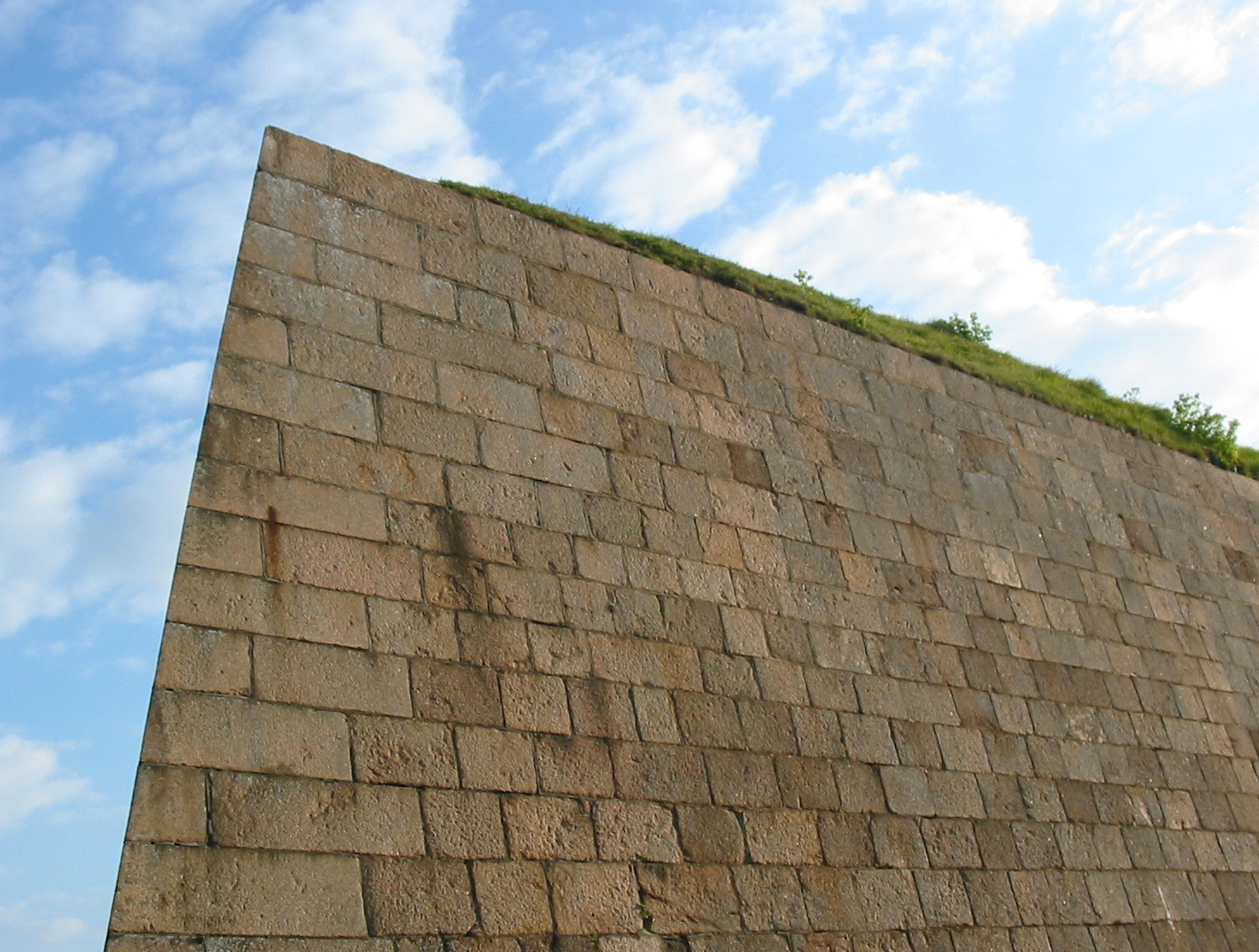
Most walls are built from large granite blocks and quoins.

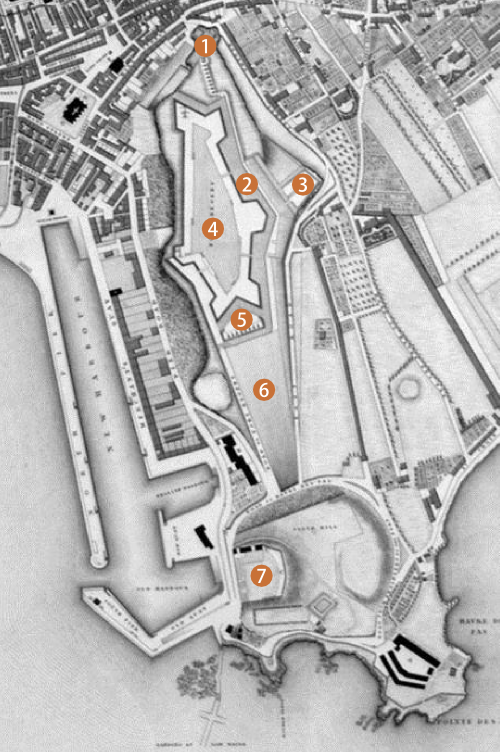
19th century map: 1: North Outworks; 2: East Ditch; 3: East Outworks; 4: Parade ground; 5: Counterguard; 6: Glacis; 7: South Hill

The construction of the fortress we see today on Town Hill began on 7 November 1806, during the Napoleonic Wars, with the laying of a foundation stone by George Don the Lieutenant Governor of Jersey. The fort was built using local workers and men from the Royal Engineers, with an average of 800 men working at any given time. This enabled a substantial amount of work to be completed 8 years later, in 1814.

It was given the name Fort Regent in honour of Prince Regent, who was King of the United Kingdom of Great Britain and Ireland at this time.

The design of the fort is credited to Lieutenant-General John Humfrey, and it is thought that Lieutenant-Colonel John Evelegh would have also worked on the final plans.

=== Western flank and rampart ===
Along the top of the cliffs on the west side, between the West Bastion and Northwest Redan, is a 5.5-m- thick (18 ft) curtain wall that provided protection from attacks on that side. Quarrying also steepened the cliffs.

=== East Rampart ===
A curtain wall, similar to the one on the west, provides protection to bombardment from the east. The East Bastion and south redans are positioned behind this wall. The height of this rampart allows for a view to the southeast coast of Jersey, including a view of Icho Tower, a Martello tower built around 1811.

=== Bastions, redans, ditches and glacis ===
Two bastions are at the fort, one facing west and the other facing east, and four redans, two to the south, and two at the north end. Cannons placed in these areas would have been able to target forces attacking Fort Regent from any direction. The redans are not typical examples because they have more than two sides, are closer to demi-bastions, as seen in hornwork.

The fort has one 210-m-long (689 ft) glacis at the south end, which is a flat, sloping open area of grass, known as the Glacis Field. The only road and foot access to the fort is in this area; all other sides are very steep or vertical cliffs.

The East Ditch has a masonry-faced counterscarp and scarp, with a further outer ditch in the form of a large cutting. The Jersey Eastern Railway enlarged the cutting in 1873 to use it as a train station.

=== Cannon ===
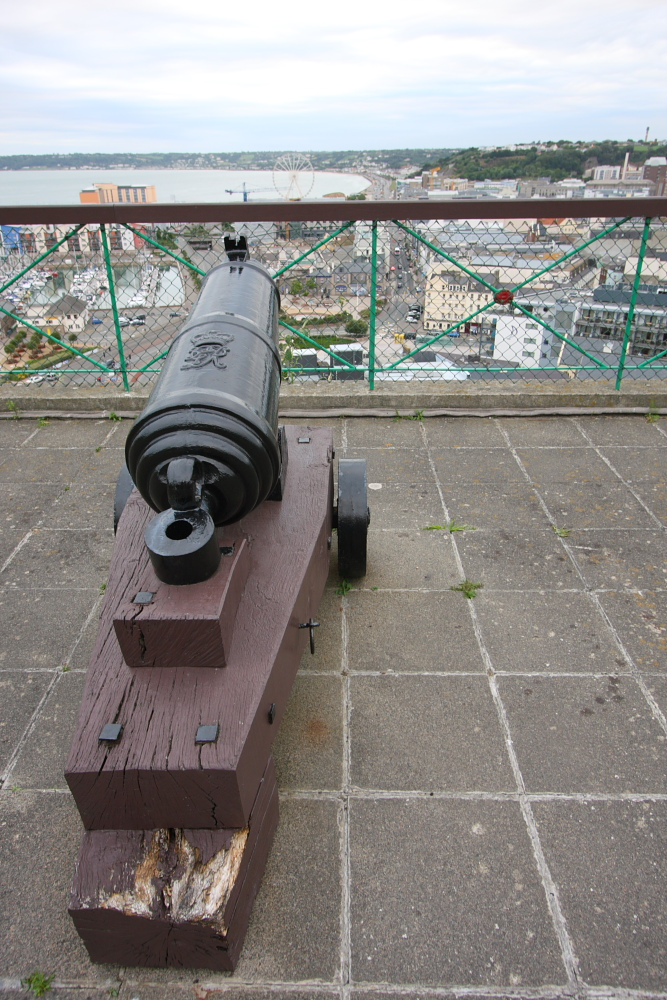
A carronade in 2008, on the west rampart

Positions and embrasures for 100 cannon are in place within the fortress. However, a report dated 8 March 1810, counts only 55 cannon and six mortars at Fort Regent.

=== Water well ===
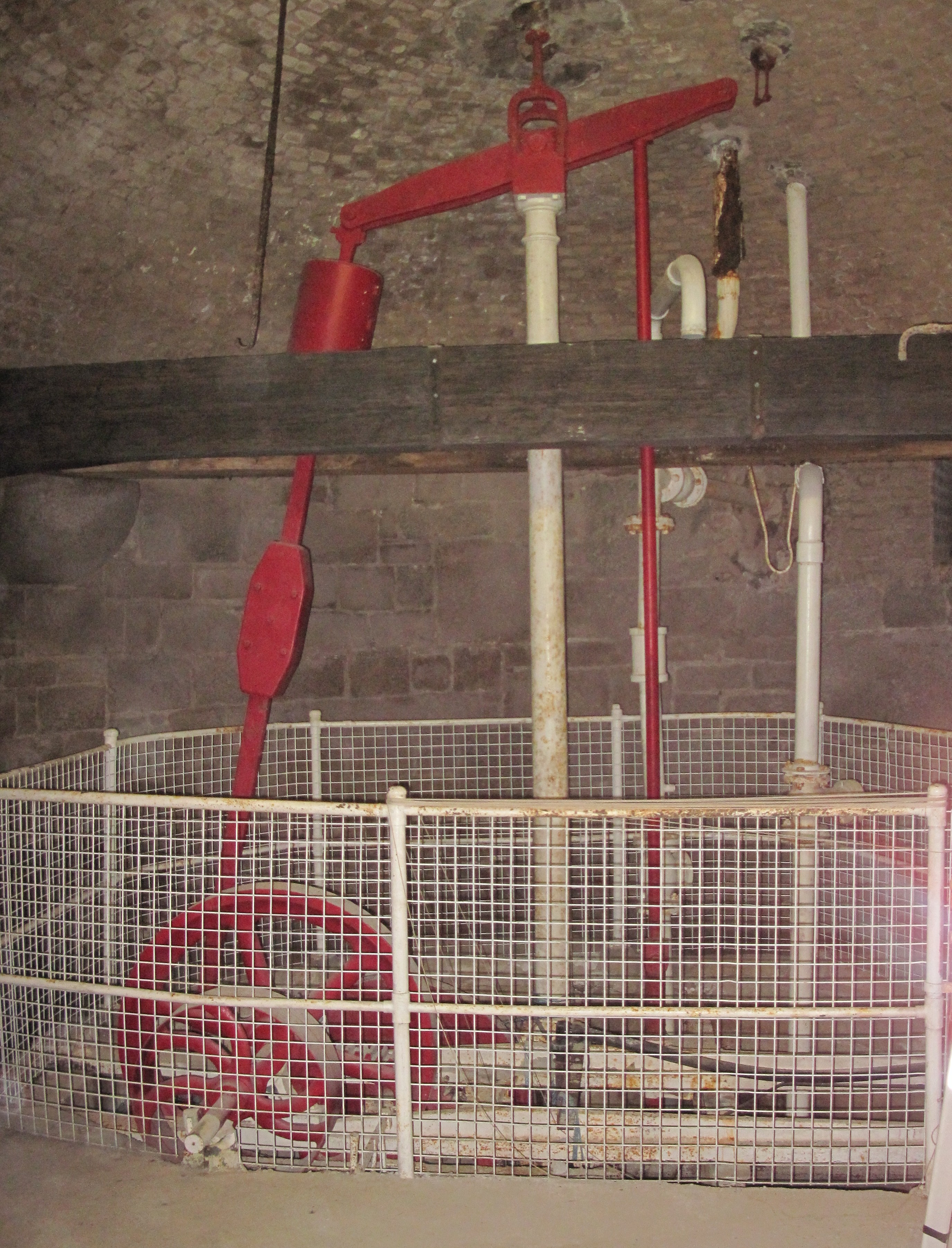
The pump at the top of the Fort Regent well

No well existed on the hill, so between December 1806 and October 1808, a deep well-shaft was sunk into the notoriously hard Jersey granite to a depth of about 71 m (235 ft) by blasting a shaft of an average diameter of 8 ft with gunpowder charges. The Fort Regent well is believed to be the deepest well-shaft in the island [excluding artesian bores], and is a stunning tribute to the persistence and ingenuity of Georgian military engineers.

When the sappers and miners blasted through to the spring, at a depth of 221 ft below the well-curb in the underground well-head chamber, they did so unexpectedly and water rose rapidly in the shaft. The miners were hanging in a basket halfway up the shaft. The major of engineers in charge of the works recorded that "great difficulty was experienced in recovering the men to the surface before they were drowned by the inrush from the Spring". The construction records, including the commanding officer's daily diary, are now in the National Archives at Kew and were researched by the architect and the main contractor – C.G. Dumond (Builders) Ltd. – for useful information during the conversion of the fort into a leisure centre in the 1970s.

The granite was drilled with "jumper drill" irons hit with sledgehammers. As originally commissioned, water was raised to the surface by an above-ground horse whim or capstan at parade-ground level, but this proved to be both time-consuming and unpopular with the soldiery and lasted for only a year after the official opening in 1814. The first rocking beam pumps, operated in series all the way down the well-shaft by one long pump-rod, and operated by a man-powered capstan through a line shaft and gearing, was delivered and installed by Henry Maudeslay and Son in 1815, in a double circular underground chamber excavated just below the level of the parade ground. One chamber contained the capstan and connected to the adjacent chamber which contained the well-head machinery, and the mouth of the shaft. At some later time, the man-powered capstan was converted to operate by donkey power. This method, too, proved less efficient than was thought desirable; it proved difficult to get the donkeys into and out of the chambers through the long, sloping tunnel which originally began at ground level in the East Bastion, The motive power was changed again to be provided by a small steam engine. The steam engine, in turn, gave way to a gas engine, which is still in-situ, a rare survival of that late-Victorian technology, along with Henry Maudeslay's original well-head machinery from 1815.

During the 1970s reconstruction, the local government's client organisation – the Fort Regent Development Committee (FRDC) ordered that all of the well-shaft access ladders, cast-iron floor-gratings (supplied from Ironbridge by order of the War Office), and pump rods and valves – should be removed from the well-shaft and scrapped, "because the Fort requires the well-water to be used for commercial and domestic supplies within the new leisure complex, and contamination from this old machinery cannot be risked". This act of "cultural vandalism" was carried out under the supervision of the clerk of the works, Mr. Greenwell, which was protested by a few knowledgeable persons at the time, but the reconstruction contract was politically sensitive; knowledge of the machinery's destruction and scrapping was limited to members of the managing FRDC, and to the project architect and main contractors' staff. So, the general public of Jersey, who might have expressed their concerns, never became aware of the destruction until long after the fact: even now it is not common knowledge amongst those who care about preserving as much of Jersey's historic past as possible. Though the main contractor salvaged all the recovered machinery parts, and handed them over to the client, as required under the construction contract for "all antiquities recovered from the Site", the Fort Regent authorities scrapped them two years after contract completion as being "of no historic interest and not worthy of preservation".

Access to the underground well-head and machinery chambers down a steep set of concrete steps and a steeply sloping tunnel is deemed too dangerous under modern health and safety concerns, this historic 19th-century well-head machinery seems doomed to be forever hidden away from members of the public. During the clearing and cleaning of the well shaft in 1979, the main contractor discovered a 40-ft-tall flat sheet of granite caused by a natural fracture plane that formed one face of the shaft about 100 ft below the surface. It was so hot, water dripping onto it from further up the shaft turned to steam, hot enough to blister a bare hand accidentally brought into contact with the granite surface. This may be the only example in the island of geothermal heat.

== Signal station ==
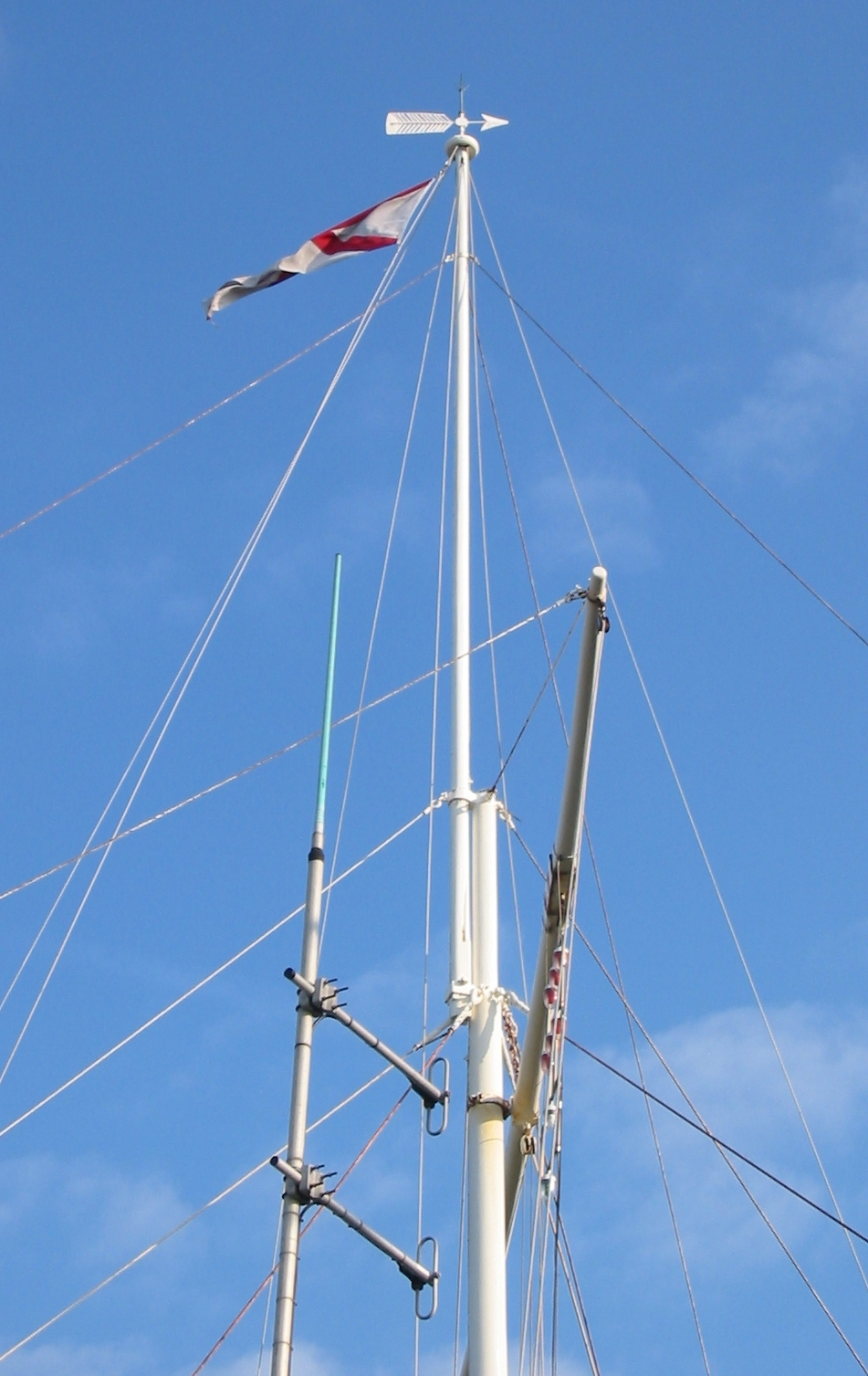
The Fort Regent signal station

The Town Hill has been used as a commercial signal station since the late 18th century, prior to the construction of Fort Regent.

== 20th century ==
The last British force to garrison Fort Regent was the Royal Militia of the Island of Jersey, who left the fort on 20 June 1940, and served in the UK as part of The Hampshire Regiment. The militia reformed as the Jersey Field Squadron in 1987, and are located in the Engineers Barracks at La Collette.

=== German occupation ===
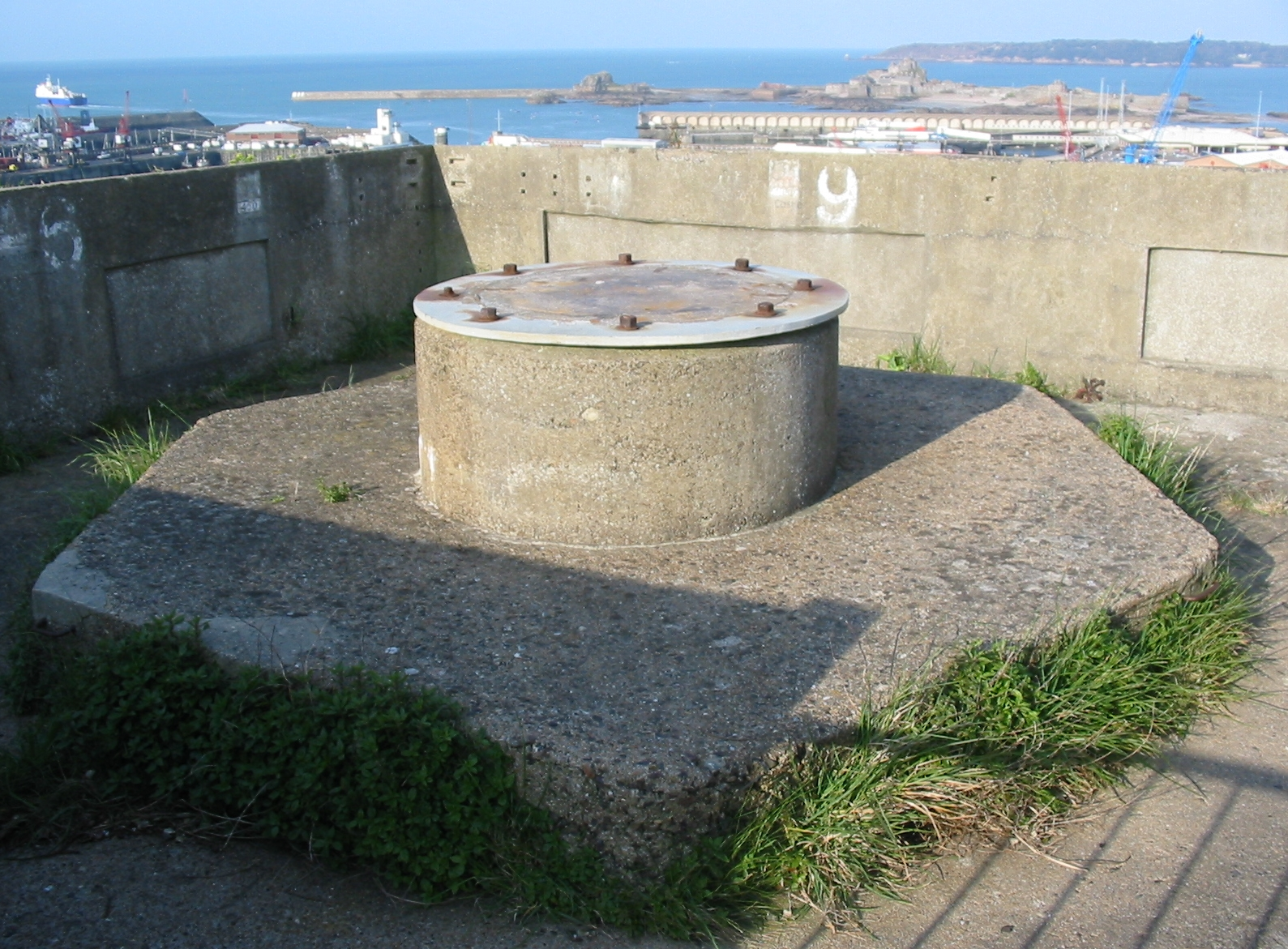
One of the gun emplacements dating from the occupation

During the German occupation of the Channel Islands, the German forces made additions to the fort, including platforms for flak cannons. Some of these concrete structures remain to date.

=== Storage ===
After the German occupation, the fort was used as a storage area for potatoes, wine, and coal. The nearby power station was coal-fired at the time.

=== Leisure centre ===
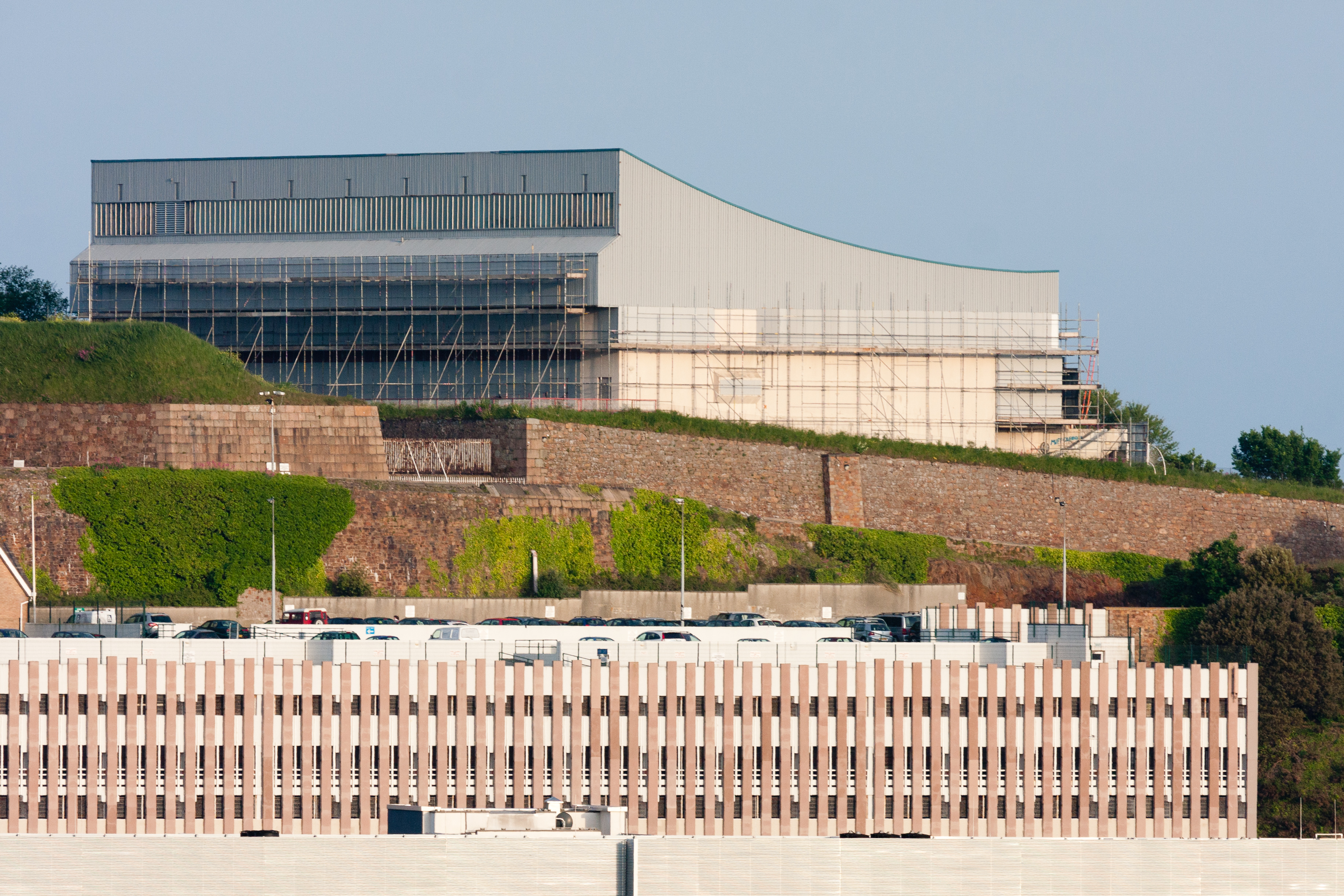
The swimming pool building (since demolished) can be seen in the upper area of the photo

In December 1967, States of Jersey made a decision to adapt the site into a leisure centre. The swimming pool located on the glacis field, which opened in 1971 and closed in 2009, was the first modern addition to the fort. Demolition of its roof and flattening of the site was completed in early 2021.

== Proposed developments ==
In 2021, the Government of Jersey published a report Inspiring Active Places Strategy. The strategy is proposed to have a total cost of circa £100 million. The plan proposes the removal of sports facilities from Fort Regent by early 2022, which is "beyond the end of its useful life". The report states it is not the best location for health and fitness facilities for St. Helier residents. A new leisure centre is due to be constructed in the town centre to replace the fitness facilities lost on the site of the Waterfront centre. The reported expected that would be moved to Le Rocquier School, Oakfields at Hautlieu School and Springfield Stadium.

== See also ==
- Mont Orgueil
- Mount Bingham
