= Clint Grant =

American photographer (1916–2010)

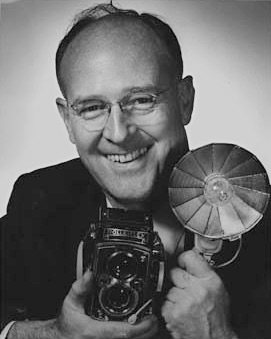
- Clint Grant with his Rolleiflex camera and flash
- Born: Donald Clinton Grant; August 17, 1916; Nashville, Tennessee, U.S.
- Died: April 21, 2010 (aged 93); Dallas, Texas, U.S.
- Occupations: Photographer; photojournalist
- Years active: 1949–1986; 1986–1997 (semi-retired)
- Employer: The Dallas Morning News
- Spouse: Myrtis Ann Halliburton (m. 1939)

Donald Clinton Grant (August 17, 1916 – April 21, 2010) was an American photographer and photojournalist based in Dallas, Texas. He was a staff photographer with The Dallas Morning News from 1949 to 1986. He was particularly known for his images of animals and children. Grant's photographs were published in numerous newspapers and magazines, including Paris Match, Newsweek and Time; five of his feature photos were published on the back page of issues of Life magazine.

Grant was on assignment in November 1963 to cover President John F. Kennedy's trip from Washington, D.C., to Dallas. One of his photographs made the front page of the November 22 edition of the Morning News; a copy is believed to be the last thing Kennedy ever signed before his assassination later that day. Grant also would make several pictures at Parkland Memorial Hospital within minutes after Kennedy's motorcade arrived following the shooting in Dealey Plaza.

Grant was the recipient of multiple photojournalism awards during his career, including the Medallion for Excellence in Photojournalism. He retired from The Dallas Morning News in 1986, but continued working in a semi-retired capacity for more than a decade thereafter. He died in Dallas of heart failure at age 93.

== Early life ==
Clint Grant was born in Nashville, Tennessee. During his time at Vanderbilt University, economic troubles brought on by the Great Depression forced Grant's family to move from Nashville; they settled in Dallas, Texas, where his father was asked to lead the Art Department at the Morning News. Grant got a job with the Photo Department, but he was drafted into the United States Army before he could report to work. Grant served during World War II in Europe, where he never used a camera.

Grant married Myrtis Ann Halliburton in 1939 after a brief courtship; they had known each other for ten months before they walked down the aisle. When they met, he worked behind the dairy counter at the local A&P market where she was a customer.

== Photography and photojournalism ==
When Grant returned from overseas to Dallas in 1945, all Morning News staff photographers resumed their duties, leaving him without a job. He ran a photography studio until 1949, when a position at the newspaper became available.

His editor said Clint Grant "was great with children and animals, which took absolute patience." This photograph was part of a collection donated by Grant to the Dallas Public Library.

During his early years with the News, Grant was one of a group of staff photographers that included Jack Beers, Tom Dillard, Doris Jacoby and Joe Laird. He gained a reputation for generosity as a mentor while with the newspaper, accompanying many young photographers on their early assignments; one of them later recalled that whenever the Morning News needed a feature photograph, they would send "the trusty Clint Grant" to the zoo to work with an animal. His evocative photographs often featured animals and children, and his editor said Grant's knack for putting subjects at ease came largely because he "had the patience of Job."

Grant's work also accompanied sports stories. A photograph of a boxing fan and a fallen fighter was named one of the best sports pictures of 1956.

Grant taught classes in photography in the 1950s and '60s at North Texas University, where he served on the journalism advisory board. He was also the official photographer for the Dallas Zoo and the State Fair of Texas.

In an interview, Grant said he had his own tricks for making photos, especially of unwilling subjects at the sites of news stories. He would pre-focus, pretend to not aim the camera, and "shoot from the hip." He believed that any good photojournalist should have the skills necessary to do the job without needing to use the viewfinder.

One of Grant's photos was blown up to eight feet and displayed for one year in Grand Central Terminal in New York City. He also photographed the culinary creations of some of the top chefs in Dallas, who all knew Grant and respected his work. A menu item at the Casa Dominguez restaurant in Dallas was named for Grant.

Two collections of Grant's work have been published: Moments from Life: An Exhibition of Photographs from the Grant Estate in 2000, and 50 Years of the Best Photos of Clint Grant in 2001. Moments from Life was published to accompany a traveling exhibit of 55 of Grant's images. One of his photographs was included in Humor in News Photography, a collection published in 1961. Grant was assigned to photograph some new cars and laid his hat atop one of the taillights; the resulting image resembled "a Halloween spook, a Martian or the pilot of a satellite." A Grant picture published by Life magazine was included in its 1988 compilation Life Smiles Back.

In addition to his feature photographs, Grant was known for his work accompanying hard news stories. Grant photographed every U.S. president and vice president starting with Harry S. Truman and through the administration of George H. W. Bush. He was present for the 1961 funeral for three-time House Speaker Sam Rayburn, where he captured former Presidents Truman and Dwight D. Eisenhower, President Kennedy, House Parliamentarian Clarence Cannon, and Vice President Lyndon B. Johnson standing together.

=== John F. Kennedy ===
==== Dallas, 1960 ====
John F. Kennedy and his running mate, Lyndon B. Johnson, were close to securing their spots on the Democrats' ticket when they took a two-day swing through the Dallas–Fort Worth area in September 1960. Landing at Meacham Airport, the candidates rode in a motorcade through Dallas to the Chance Vought Aircraft factory, where Kennedy made an address. Grant accompanied Kennedy and Johnson, making numerous photographs of the trip; the pictures were developed, but kept in storage until their publication in 2013.

==== Dallas, 1963 ====
Image made by Grant in Dealey Plaza following the assassination of John F. Kennedy. Bill and Gayle Newman cover their children on the lawn. Grant's brother-in law, Associated Press photojournalist Ike Altgens, stands at the curb to photo-right.

Several days before President Kennedy made his November flight to Texas, Grant had been assigned to cover the state's delegation in Washington, D.C., then fly back with the White House press corps; he was the only photographer to make the trip. At Dallas Love Field, Grant made the only published photograph from that visit of the president and Jacqueline Kennedy, Lyndon Johnson and Lady Bird Johnson, and Texas Governor John Connally and Nellie Connally, all in the same image. Another of Grant's photos, from San Antonio's Aerospace Medicine Center, was published on the front page of the Dallas Morning News on November 22; a copy was signed that morning by President Kennedy—across the photo, to Jan White—and is believed to be the last item he signed before he climbed aboard the presidential limousine for his intended trip to the Dallas Trade Mart. (Note: White, a maid at the Hotel Texas in November 1963, put her copy up for auction in 2009. Heritage Auctions called it "one of the last signatures, if not the last signature, that President John F. Kennedy gave before his tragic death.")

Grant tried to find a seat in the third camera car in the motorcade—the one reserved for local photographers—but it was full; he was then given a spot in the second camera car. Too far back to capture the shooting in Dealey Plaza, Grant's car had just turned onto Houston Street from Main Street "when we heard one shot—pause—two shots in rapid succession." Thinking someone was playing a prank, he gave it no further thought until he saw bystanders on the ground along Elm Street, where he made a photograph from the moving camera car of Bill and Gayle Newman lying atop their children on the grass.

Afterward, Grant suggested to his colleagues that they should catch up with the presidential limousine. Since he was the only Dallas-based member of the press in camera car two, Grant directed his driver to the Trade Mart, where they saw no activity. A worker across the street said he saw a limousine speed past, accompanied by motorcycles with their sirens blaring; Grant knew immediately that they were headed to Parkland Memorial Hospital. Once at Parkland, Grant started snapping pictures of anything he could, including Vice President Johnson's car, and a man and a police officer delivering what Grant believed was blood plasma.

Grant later covered the trial of Jack Ruby. On the day the verdict was read, he believed his assignment was to photograph the jurors, but they were shielded from his view.

Twenty-five years after the assassination, Grant wrote that the events did not really sink in until after he had finished his work that day. "Then I was stunned, disappointed and embarrassed that it had happened—especially in my home town. I felt like crawling under a log. Although I wasn't a great admirer, he was my President and I have great respect for whoever holds the office."

==== Reporters' panel, 1993 ====
Grant took part in "Reporters Remember 11-22-63" at Southern Methodist University in Dallas in November 1993. The panel discussion, broadcast on C-SPAN as Journalists Remember the JFK Assassination, featured members of the press who spoke of their experiences on the day 30 years earlier that Kennedy was killed. From the dais, Grant offered his memories of the motorcade, and recalled asking his boss afterward if he should go back to Washington, D.C., with Kennedy's body and being told no. Grant said he returned to Love Field to retrieve his luggage ahead of a planned visit to Vice President Johnson's ranch nearby; just as he reached the planes he saw Judge Sarah T. Hughes leaving Air Force One. "I'd just missed her swearing in the new president."

== Later life and death ==
Grant retired his position with The Dallas Morning News in 1986; he stayed on in a semi-retired capacity until 1997. Five years later, Grant was awarded an honorary degree from Knox College in Illinois, (Note: Grant's grandfather Innes taught literature and ancient languages at Knox for 27 years starting in 1842.) which congratulated Grant for more than 100 photojournalism honors at the state, regional and national levels, including the Medallion for Excellence in Photojournalism from the Southwest Journalism Forum. Associate Professor of Art Lynette Lombard lauded Grant for his body of work starting in 1963. "Clint Grant's work for the Dallas Morning News made him one of this country's most important photojournalists. Through his photography, he has helped establish photojournalism as one of our most important forms of documentation of the public record".

Clint Grant died of heart failure in his Dallas home in 2010. Myrtis Grant, his wife of nearly 71 years, died in Dallas six months later.

== See also ==
- Ike Altgens
- Mal Couch
- Robert H. Jackson
- Cecil W. Stoughton
