= Peter Willis =

Peter Willis may refer to:

- Peter Willis (referee) (1937–2021), English football referee
- Pete Willis (born 1960), English musician and songwriter
- Peter Tom Willis (born 1967), American football quarterback
- Peter Willis (journalist) (1966–2021), British journalist and newspaper editor

== See also ==
- Peter Wallis (diplomat) (born 1935), British diplomat
