= Rosemary Willis =

Witness to the Kennedy assassination (born 1953)

Rosemary Willis (born May 3, 1953) was a close witness during the assassination of United States President John F. Kennedy.

Clearly seen in the Zapruder film at the start of the assassination wearing a white, hooded coat and a red skirt, while she trotted in the Dealey Plaza grass located to the presidential limousine's left, she runs southwestward and parallel with the limousine, which she faces for a short time when the limousine is to her direct right.

From Z-142 until z166, Rosemary takes four strides (R-L-R-L), so she running at about one stride every six frames. From Z-166 to Z173 she completes another stride (seven frames) and from Z-173 to Z180 she completes another (seven frames). From Z-180 to Z-188 she completes a shorter stride and a final slow stride from Z-188 to z198. By Z-199 she has both feet together and the feet are stopped. They may be stopped by z198, although it is blurred. At Z-199 to Z-201 her feet and her shoulders are facing toward the President's car but her hood is turned farther to her right. Part of the opening of her hood is visible up to Z-201. At Z-202 to Z-206 she has turned her head much farther to her right so that the hood opening is not visible in those Z-frames.

In his book, Case Closed,author Gerald Posner cites from the Dallas Times Herald (1979) a story by David Lui in which he quotes Rosemary Willis stating "I stopped when I heard the shot".

Rosemary Willis Roach (married name) is quoted in an article in the November 1998 edition of the Texas Monthly, as follows:

“As the motorcade made the turn from Houston to Elm Street, they’d just gone a few feet when the first shot rang out. I didn’t know what it was, but I was looking for what I heard. And the pigeons immediately ascended off that roof of the school book depository building—that’s what caught my eye. The second shot that I heard came from behind my right shoulder. By that time the limousine had already moved farther down. And the next one, right after that, still came from the right but not from as far back—it was up some. Still behind me, but not as far back as the other one. And the next one that came was from the grassy knoll, and I saw the smoke coming through the trees, into the air, and fragments of his head ascended into the air, and from my vision, focal point, the smoke and the fragments, you know, everything met. I mean, there’s no question in my mind what I saw or what I heard.”

In 1978 Rosemary Willis was interviewed by the House Select Committee on Assassinations (HSCA), which reported as follows:

"(27) The committee interviewed Willis' daughter, Rose Mary Willis, on 'November 8, 1978, at her home in Dallas . Ms. Willis stated that she was present with her father and a sister in the area of the grass section of the plaza at the time of the Presidential motorcade on November 22, 1963. (80) 31s. Willis explained that as the President's car approached, she ran alongside the limousine almost to the triple underpass. (81) (28) Ms. Willis stated that during that time, she noticed two persons who looked "conspicuous." (82) One was a man near the curb holding an umbrella, who appeared to be more concerned with opening or closing the umbrella than dropping to the ground like everyone else at the time of the shots. (83) The other was a person who was standing just behind the concrete wall near the triple underpass. (84) That person appeared to "disappear the next instant."(85) Ms. Willis further described the location of this person as the corner section of the white concrete wall between the area of photographer Abraham Zapruder's right side and the top of the concrete stairway leading up to the center of the grassy knoll. (86) (29) Ms. Willis said she was aware of three shots being fired. (87) She gave no information on the direction or location of the shots, but stated that her father became upset when the policemen in the area appeared to run away from where he thought the shots came from ; that is, they were running away from the grassy knoll. (88)"

Immediately after the upright-sitting President John F. Kennedy is first hidden at frame 207 by the "Stemmons Freeway" traffic sign in the Zapruder film, Willis suddenly, and beginning at Z-214, snaps her head very rapidly 90 to 100 degrees westward (completely away from the Depository southeast corner) within 0.16 second to then face Abraham Zapruder and the grassy knoll by Z-217.

Precisely 0.60 second after starting her westward head snap towards Zapruder and the grassy knoll, President Kennedy's head then emerges back into the Zapruder film view at Z-225. At that same instant, he was still sitting upright, and his facial expressions and arms were already clearly displaying his physical movements and neuro-physical sensed reactions to his already having been impacted by a bullet sometime prior to Z-225.

In 1978, Willis was interviewed by investigators for the House Select Committee on Assassinations (HSCA) and she stated that she heard three shots during the assassination.

She also stated to the HSCA that while she was still facing the grassy knoll picket fence, she was attracted to view the quick movement of a person on the grassy knoll who quickly dropped down behind a "wall", out of her view.

Willis was also documented in the HSCA report stating that her father, military veteran Phillip Willis, became very upset when the Dallas policemen, sheriffs, and detectives ran away from the grassy knoll, after they had first quickly run onto the grassy knoll where he thought a shot had been fired from.

Rosemary's sister, Linda Willis, stated to assassination researcher and author Richard Trask ("Pictures of the Pain" 1994) that after the assassination, she and Rosemary also saw someone find a piece of the president's head that had landed in the grass in a location at least 22 feet (6.7 m) to the left of the president.

After the assassination, Willis, along with her sister, father, and her mother (Marilyn), were present at the Kodak photographic laboratory in Dallas getting her father's assassination-related photo slides developed. They were there at the same time as when the Zapruder film was also first developed and first shown to approximately nineteen persons.

Even though she was a very close assassination witness, Rosemary was never interviewed by any Warren Commission investigators.

Rosemary Willis became in the 1970s a school teacher in Dallas.
