= Jim Willis (1950s pitcher) =

American baseball player (1927–2026)

- Pitcher
- Born: March 20, 1927; Doyline, Louisiana, U.S.
- Died: January 2, 2026 (aged 98); Boyce, Louisiana, U.S.
- Batted: Left Threw: Right

MLB debut
- April 22, 1953, for the Chicago Cubs

Last MLB appearance
- June 5, 1954, for the Chicago Cubs

MLB statistics
- Win–loss record: 2–2
- Earned run average: 3.39
- Strikeouts: 20
- Stats at Baseball Reference

Teams
- Chicago Cubs (1953–1954)

James Gladden Willis (March 20, 1927 – January 2, 2026) was an American professional baseball pitcher. He played in Major League Baseball (MLB) during the 1953 and 1954 seasons for the Chicago Cubs. Listed at 6 ft 3 in (1.91 m), 175 lb (79 kg), Willis batted left-handed and threw right-handed. He was born in Doyline, Louisiana, and attended Northwestern State University of Louisiana. Over two seasons, Willis posted a 2–2 record with a 3.39 ERA in 27 appearances, including four starts and two complete games, giving up 25 runs on 59 hits and 35 walks while striking out 20. Willis died on January 2, 2026, at the age of 98.
