= Harry Albert Willis =

Canadian politician

Harry Albert Willis (July 11, 1904 – March 23, 1972) was a Canadian Senator and long-time fundraiser and organizer for the Progressive Conservative Party of Canada in Ontario.

Born in Belfountain, Ontario, Willis was Ontario chairman of the federal party's Ontario wing from 1943 until 1963.

A lawyer by training, Willis was a graduate of McMaster University and Osgoode Hall Law School. He was appointed to his party position by then federal leader John Bracken.

Under John Diefenbaker, Willis was one of the "three musketeers" who ran the Ontario wing along with Edwin A. Goodman and Senator William Brunt.

Diefenbaker appointed Willis to the Senate in June 1962. He stepped down as Ontario chairman following the 1963 federal election in which the Tories were defeated by Lester Pearson's Liberals with only 26 Progressive Conservative MPs being elected in Ontario.

In the business world, Willis sat on several boards of directors, including those of Denison Mines and Standard Trust. He was president of Caledon Holdings Limited, which developed residential subdivisions. The company owned 1,000 acres (4.0 km^{2}) near which Willis wished to develop despite the province's plans to create park Forks of the Credit Provincial Park. Willis continued buying property in the area despite the province's plans. The provincial Progressive Conservative government purchased the land from Willis in 1971, giving him an 81% profit, which resulted in complaints by the parliamentary opposition and a formal inquiry which found no wrongdoing on the part of Willis but which criticized the government for not bargaining for a lower price.

Willis died in flight from Ottawa to Toronto.
