= Picture editor =

Picture-selecting professional

Picture editor, also known as a photo editor, is a professional who collects, reviews, and chooses photographs and/or photo illustrations for publication in alignment with preset guidelines. Publications include, but are not limited to, websites, books, magazines, newspapers, art galleries, museum catalogs, and corporate products, such as catalogs and annual reports. In choosing photographs and illustrations, picture editors take into account their publication's standards, needs, and budget.

== Tasks and skills ==
A picture editor/ photo editor hires professional photographers for assignments. The main types of assignment work and skill sets to arrange are location shoots and studio shoots. The photo editor's skill set for location shoots may involve obtaining permissions, permits, and scheduling subjects, scheduling travel, and creating a shot list. and organizational skills to produce a photo shoot which means may involve hiring studios, models, prop and wardrobe stylists, set builders, and hair and makeup professionals. The picture editor has a thorough knowledge of photographers working in many genres and located in many part of the globe; they understand copyright and legal standards for all types of photographic usage and may also need to be familiar with moving images (videos). A picture editor knows how to find the most relevant image to suit the content they have to illustrate. A picture editor may oversee the edit and sequencing of images in stories, including photo essays, or photo books. The picture editor manages licenses, clears copyrights, and works within a budget.

Sometimes photo editors are in charge of an image data base; they are called photo librarians.

== How the job is changing ==
New technologies and the omnipresence of images nowadays have drastically changed the way picture editors work. They do their research mostly on the Internet, and have to browse a never-ending flow of images.

There are professional picture editors organizations, such as ANI in France or Picture Research Association in the UK.
