= Robert Willis (diplomat) =

Robert Willis (17 March 1868 – 13 January 1921) was an English administrator in China.

== Early life ==
Willis was born at Netherbury, Dorset, the son of Rev. Robert Francis Willis, M.A., rector of Cudworth, Somerset, and Christiana Charlotte, daughter of Shering Keddle, a solicitor. His grandfather was the mechanical engineer and academic Robert Willis; he was a descendant of the physician Francis Willis, who had treated King George III.

He was educated at Crewkerne and Bruton, then went up to Gonville and Caius College, Cambridge (B.A. 1907).

== Career ==
In August 1891, after passing a competitive examination, Willis was appointed a student interpreter in China. He was promoted to 2nd class assistant in 1897, and the next year appointed pro-consul at Canton. He was acting consul at Zhenjiang for a time in 1900, then transferred to Beijing as Accountant until 1901, when he was made acting consul at Yichang; he remained there until 1903. In January of that year, Willis was appointed acting consul at Shantou, where he remained until 1906; he was then made consul for the province of Zhejiang, residing at Hangzhou. From 1907 to 1909 he was acting consul at Mukden, at Harbin from 1910 to 1911, then returned to Mukden as acting consul-general until 1913. His final posting before retirement was as acting consul-general at Tianjin, until 1915.

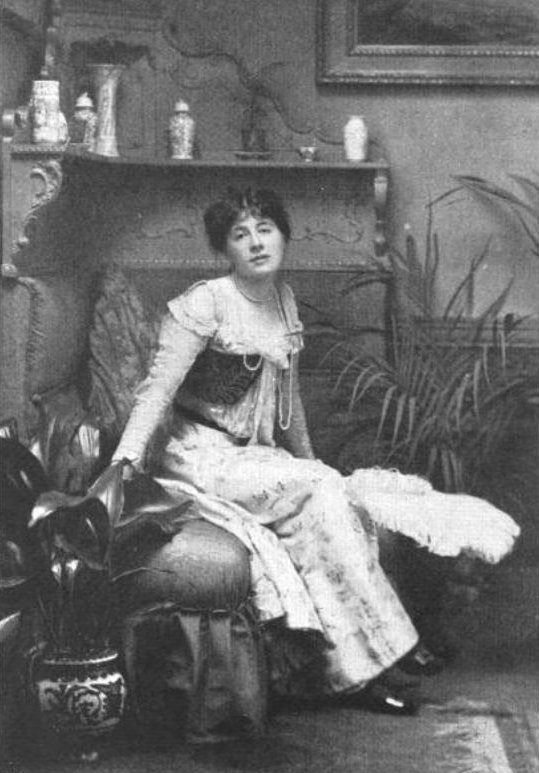
Violet Armbruster

Willis was awarded the King George V Coronation Medal in 1911. He retired to Southernwood, at Great Shelford in Cambridgeshire. This house was previously the home of the writer Rose Macaulay. Willis had married Violet, daughter of Carl Armbuster, a conductor, composer and musician, in 1899. One daughter, Rosamund Willis (Mrs W. S. Angus), A.R.C.A, taught crafts at the King Edward VII School of Art at Newcastle, was a lecturer at Durham University and principal of the Luton School of Art from 1935 to 1938. Her younger sister, Elfreda (Mrs H. N. Edwards), was a Newnham College, Cambridge-educated barrister.

Willis died at Bournemouth on 13 January 1921.
