= Harry Graham Willis =

English Southern Africa administrator (1875–1943)

Harry Graham Willis (26 January 1875 – 10 March 1943) was an English administrator in Southern Africa.

Willis was the son of Henry Scott Willis, of Northfield, Trowbridge, Wiltshire, a wool merchant, and Caroline Bevan (née Horner), whose father had been headmaster of a private school. He was the younger brother of Major-General Edward Willis, Lieutenant Governor of Jersey 1929–34, and like his brothers was educated at Marlborough College.

Entering the Colonial Service, he was appointed to north-eastern Rhodesia (in what is now Zambia, the Kafue district) in October 1900; he was made assistant native commissioner in January 1901, civil commissioner in September 1903, and native commissioner in November 1904. He was forced to retire in October 1906 due to ill health, but returned to the service as a native commissioner for the Sesheke district, as well as serving as justice of the peace and assistant resident magistrate for the Balovale sub-district in 1913. He was appointed a district officer in 1921, and ended his career having served as district commissioner for the Awemba district, and, having reached the pinnacle of his service, as provincial commissioner.

In 1914, Willis had married Alice Berthe, daughter of Edouard Fabre, of Paris, formerly of the Paris Missionary Society, Barotseland. He retired to White Lodge, Wimborne, Dorset, where he died in 1943.
