= Edward Willis (British Army officer) =

Major-General Edward Willis CB CMG
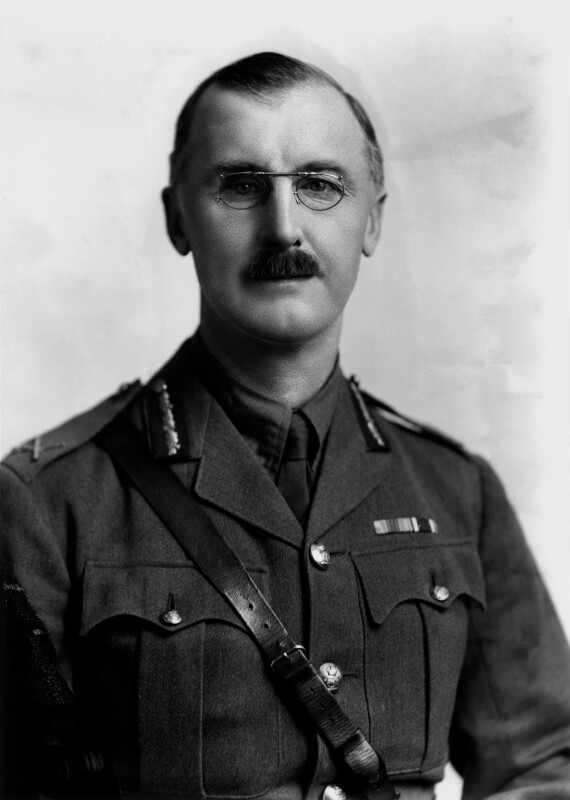
- Willis in 1917
- Born: 5 September 1870
- Died: 26 June 1961 (aged 90)
- Military career
- Allegiance: United Kingdom
- Branch: British Army
- Service years: 1890–1934
- Rank: Major-General
- Conflicts: World War I
- Awards: Companion of the Order of the Bath; Companion of the Order of St Michael and St George

Major-General Edward Henry Willis, CB, CMG (5 September 1870 – 26 June 1961) was a British Army officer who became Lieutenant Governor of Jersey.

== Background ==
Willis was the second son of Henry Scott Willis, a wool merchant of Northfield, Trowbridge, Wiltshire. His elder brother took over the family wool business, having served as a supernumerary captain (honorary major) with The Duke of Edinburgh's Regiment, and his younger brother was a provincial commissioner in Northern Rhodesia.

== Military career ==
Willis was commissioned into the Royal Field Artillery (RFA) as a second-lieutenant on 14 February 1890, promoted to lieutenant on 14 February 1893, and to captain on 19 January 1900. He was attached to the 60th battery RFA which was stationed in British India until November 1902, when he was in command as they returned home. They were subsequently stationed at Ballinrobe, County Mayo.

After serving in World War I, during which he was promoted to temporary brigadier general in January 1916, he was appointed major general, Royal Artillery in 1921 and Director of the Royal Artillery in 1927. He became Lieutenant Governor of Jersey in 1929 and retired in 1934.

== Later life ==
Having been appointed CB, CMG and received the Order of St Stanislaus, 2nd Class (with swords) in the course of his career, Willis died at his house, Westlands, at Saint Brélade, Jersey on 26 June 1961. In 1904 he married Sarah Augusta Barlow, daughter of Micah Barlow. Their son, Major John Henry Willis, M.C., of the 12th Lancers, was the second husband of the actress Hermione Baddeley, from 1940 until their 1946 divorce. In 1925, he married Ellis Mary, daughter of Alexander William Duke.

Government offices
Preceded by Sir Francis Bingham	Lieutenant Governor of Jersey; 1929–1934	Succeeded by Sir Horace Martelli
