= Henry Parker Willis =

American financial expert

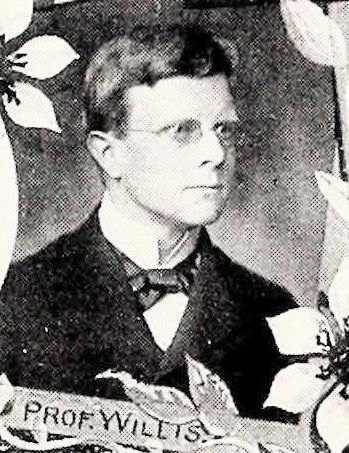
- Willis in c. 1900

President of the Philippine National Bank
- In office 1916–1918
- Governor-General: Francis Burton Harrison
- Preceded by: position established
- Succeeded by: Samuel Ferguson

Personal details
- Born: August 14, 1874 Weymouth, Massachusetts
- Died: July 18, 1937 (aged 62)

Academic background
- Education: University of Chicago
- Doctoral advisor: James Laurence Laughlin

Academic work
- Institutions: Columbia University; George Washington University; Washington and Lee University
- Doctoral students: Charles P. Kindleberger

Henry Parker Willis (August 14, 1874 – July 18, 1937) was an American financial expert and economist.

== Biography ==
He was born at Weymouth, Massachusetts, the son of the Universalist minister and suffragist Olympia Brown and John Henry Willis. He graduated from the University of Chicago with a Ph.D. in 1897 and was a member of Alpha Kappa Psi professional business fraternity.

Willis taught economics and political science at Washington and Lee University. He was professor of economics at George Washington University and lectured at Columbia University, becoming a professor of economics there in 1919 and acted as the director of research until 1922.

He served as an expert to the Ways and Means and Banking and Currency committees of the United States House of Representatives, and in other positions. Willis was the first Secretary of the Federal Reserve Board, serving between 1914 and 1918.

In 1916, Willis took a leave of absence to become the first president of the Philippine National Bank. In 1926, he was appointed the chairman of the Commission of Inquiry into Banking and the Issue of Notes, a committee established by the government of the Irish Free State to determine what changes were necessary in relation to banking and banknote issue, which recommended the creation of a new currency for the state. From 1930 to 1933, he served as a special adviser to the Romanian government.

He was married to Rosa Johnston Brooke and had four children. On July 18, 1937, Willis died at Oak Bluffs, Martha's Vineyard, Massachusetts.

== Philippine financial crisis ==
Easy access to credit from the PNB was a key factor in creating an economic bubble leading up to the 1919–1922 Philippine financial crisis. Willis, as the first president of the bank, aimed to enhance Philippine exports but became unpopular among Nacionalista Party leaders who had different goals and disapprove of his conservative and academic approach. General Venancio Concepción, a revolutionary veteran, took charge as PNB president in 1918 and drove the aggressive lending policies.

== Writings ==
- A History of the Latin Monetary Union: A Study in International Monetary Action. Chicago: University of Chicago Press. 1901. p. 1 – via Internet Archive.
- Reciprocity (1903), with J. L. Laughlin
- Our Philippine Problem (1905)
- Principles and Problems of Modern Banking (1910)
- Life of Stephen A. Douglas (1911)
- The Federal Reserve System. Chicago: Blackstone Institute. 1920 – via Internet Archive.
- American Banking (1916)
