= Phillip Willis =

Witness to the Kennedy assassination

Phillip LaFrance Willis (August 2, 1918 – January 27, 1995) was a World War II veteran and a witness to the assassination of President Kennedy who testified before the Warren Commission.

== Early life and military service ==
Phillip Willis was born in Kaufman County, Texas, the son of Alvin Samuel Willis, a school teacher, and Eliza Jane Phillips. He had a brother, Doyle.

On December 7, 1941, Willis was stationed at Bellows Field on Oahu, Hawaii as a second lieutenant assigned to the 86th Observation Squadron of the United States Army Air Forces. He was present at the Japanese attack on Pearl Harbor and has been credited with leading the patrol that captured the United States' first Japanese prisoner of war in World War II, Kazuo Sakamaki. Willis flew observation and fighter aircraft, as well as combat missions in the B-17 bomber, prior to retiring in 1946 due to a back injury he sustained after being shot down over the Pacific Ocean. He received various awards and decorations for his military service including two Silver Stars and a Distinguished Flying Cross.

After retiring from military service, Willis earned a bachelor's degree in government at North Texas State Teachers College in 1948. He was elected to the Texas House of Representatives in 1946 and 1948. As of 1995, Phillip Willis and Doyle Willis were the only brothers to have served at the same time in the Texas House. Afterwards, he worked in real estate, building civil defense shelters, and became an automobile dealer. Willis moved to Dallas in 1960.

Willis was married to Marilyn Willis, and the couple had two daughters, Linda and Rosemary.

== Witness to the assassination of John F. Kennedy ==
Willis was present in Dealey Plaza during the assassination of Kennedy on November 22, 1963. Standing near the curb at the corner of Houston and Elm Streets, he took a series of color slides with his Argus Autronic I Model 35156-M immediately before, during, and after the assassination. Willis appears in the Zapruder film until frame #206, just prior to Kennedy disappearing from view behind the Stemmons Freeway sign.

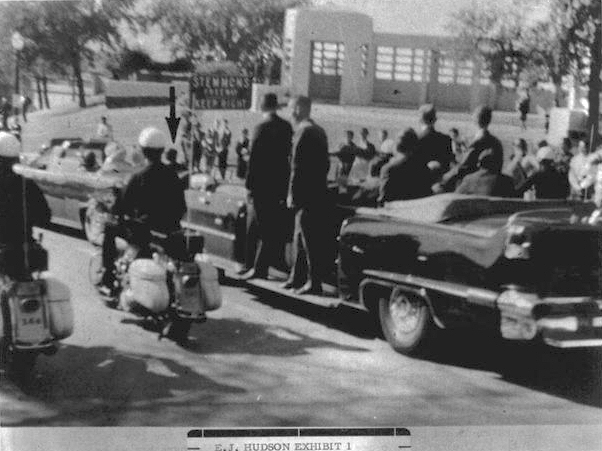

During the assassination, Willis snapped a 35mm color slide (the fifth of twenty-seven he captured in Dealey Plaza that day) showing the presidential limousine and its occupants, the United States Secret Service agents' follow-up car and occupants, parade onlookers, and the grassy knoll visible in the background.

=== Testimony and aftermath ===
On July 22, 1964, Willis provided testimony to Wesley J. Liebeler, assistant counsel of the Warren Commission, at the Post Office Building in Dallas.

Twelve of Willis's color slides with descriptions served as "Willis Exhibit 1" for the Warren Commission. Willis testified to the Commission that his fifth photo was inadvertently snapped when, just after he had prepared his 35mm Argus camera to capture a photo, he was suddenly startled by a gunshot related noise (the first of three shots he remembered hearing), and his finger that was already on the camera shutter button reacted to the gunshot related noise, then, he quickly depressed the button and the fifth photo was captured. As documented by the House Select Committee on Assassinations, this fifth photo was captured concurrent with Zapruder film frame 202.

In his fifth photo, some conspiracists allege that the image of a still-unknown person can be seen located up on the grassy knoll, seen near a 3-foot-tall concrete wall and near the 5-foot-tall stockade fence. The angled shape of this still-unknown person's outline has led to that person's image being labeled by authors in books and persons working in the Kennedy assassination research community the "black dog man".

In 1978, when Willis's daughter Rosemary was interviewed by investigators from the House Select Committee on Assassinations, she stated to the HSCA that her father became upset when the Dallas policemen, sheriffs, and detectives—who first quickly ran onto the grassy knoll where Phillip thought the shots came from—then ran away from the grassy knoll. In Willis's Warren Commission testimony he stated that shots came from the Texas School Book Depository.

Willis stated in a 1979 interview: "There's no doubt in our mind the final shot that blew his head off did not come from the depository. His head blew up like a halo. The brains and matter went to the left and the rear.'

== Later life ==
On January 27, 1995, Willis died of leukemia at his home in Dallas. The Texas House passed a resolution to honor him.
