= Henri Gonay =

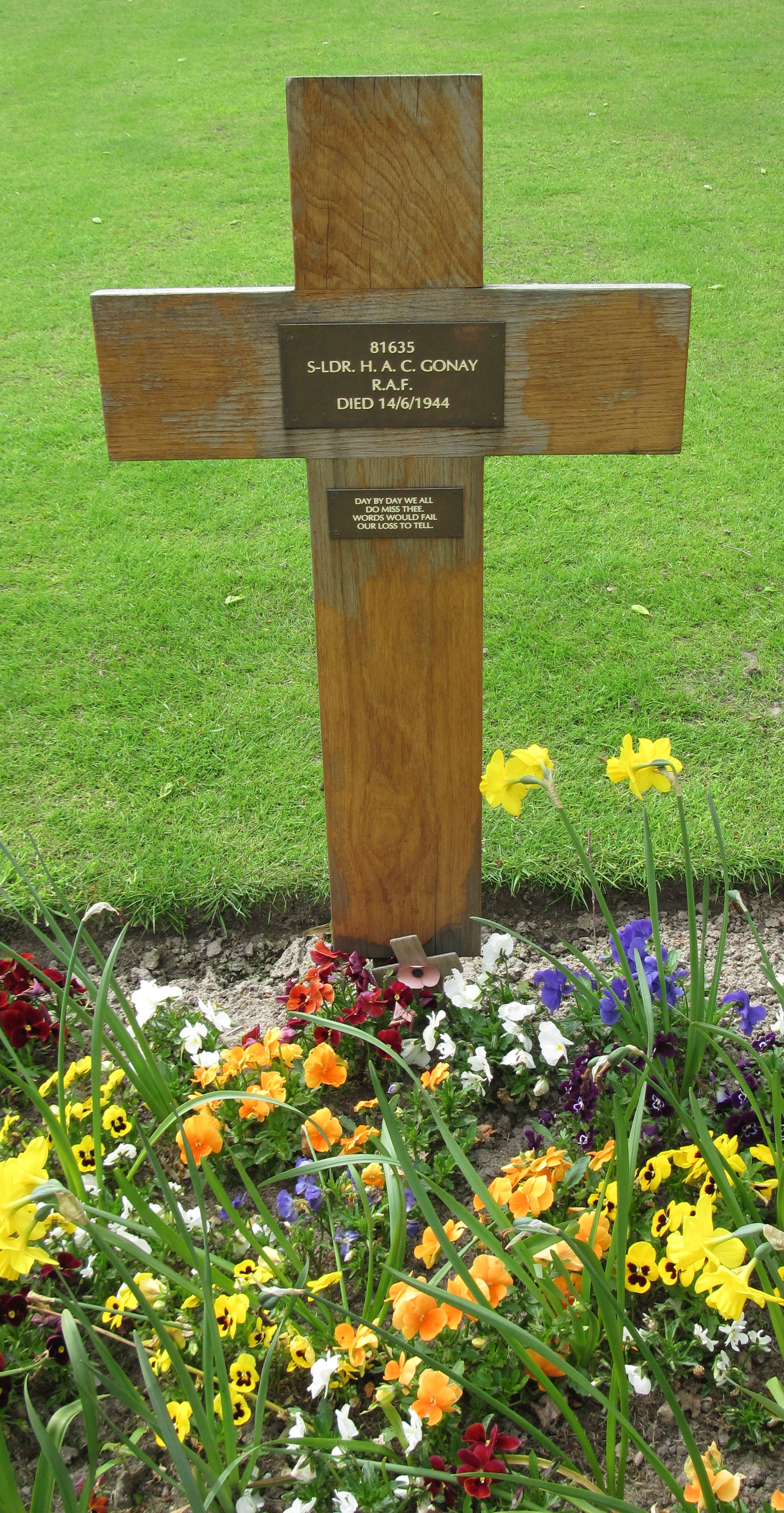
- Born: 21 July 1913; Theux, Belgium
- Died: 14 June 1944 (aged 30); Jersey, Channel Islands
- Military career
- Allegiance: Belgium; United Kingdom
- Branch: Belgian Air Component (1931–40); Royal Air Force (1940–44)
- Service years: 1931–1944
- Rank: Squadron Leader
- Service number: 81635 RAFVR
- Commands: No. 263 Squadron RAF
- Conflicts: Second World War †
- Awards: Croix de Guerre; Distinguished Flying Cross (United Kingdom); Croix de Guerre (France)

Squadron Leader Henri Alphonse Clement "Moustique" Gonay, DFC (21 July 1913 – 14 June 1944) was a Belgian airman who was killed in action while flying with the Royal Air Force during the Second World War.

Gonay was born in Theux, Belgium. He joined the Belgian Army as a student pilot at the age of 18 in 1931. After the invasions of Belgium and France in 1940 he flew to England, where he enlisted in the Royal Air Force (RAF). After instructing pilots he requested to fly with an operational unit, he flew with No. 123 Squadron RAF until being given command of No. 263 Squadron RAF on 25 February 1944. Flying Hawker Typhoons, missions were flown against French coastal targets. Shortly after D-Day, Gonay was wounded while attacking shipping. He was killed when his aircraft hit the ground in Jersey, where he was originally buried in the Allied War Cemetery, Howard Davis Park, Saint Saviour. After the war, he was reburied at the Belgian Airmen's Field of Honour in Brussels Cemetery.
