= Queen's Valley =

Queen's Valley may refer to:

- Valley of the Queens, Egypt
- Queen's Valley Reservoir, Jersey
