= St Peter la Rocque =

Coordinates: 49.170205°N 2.03613°W

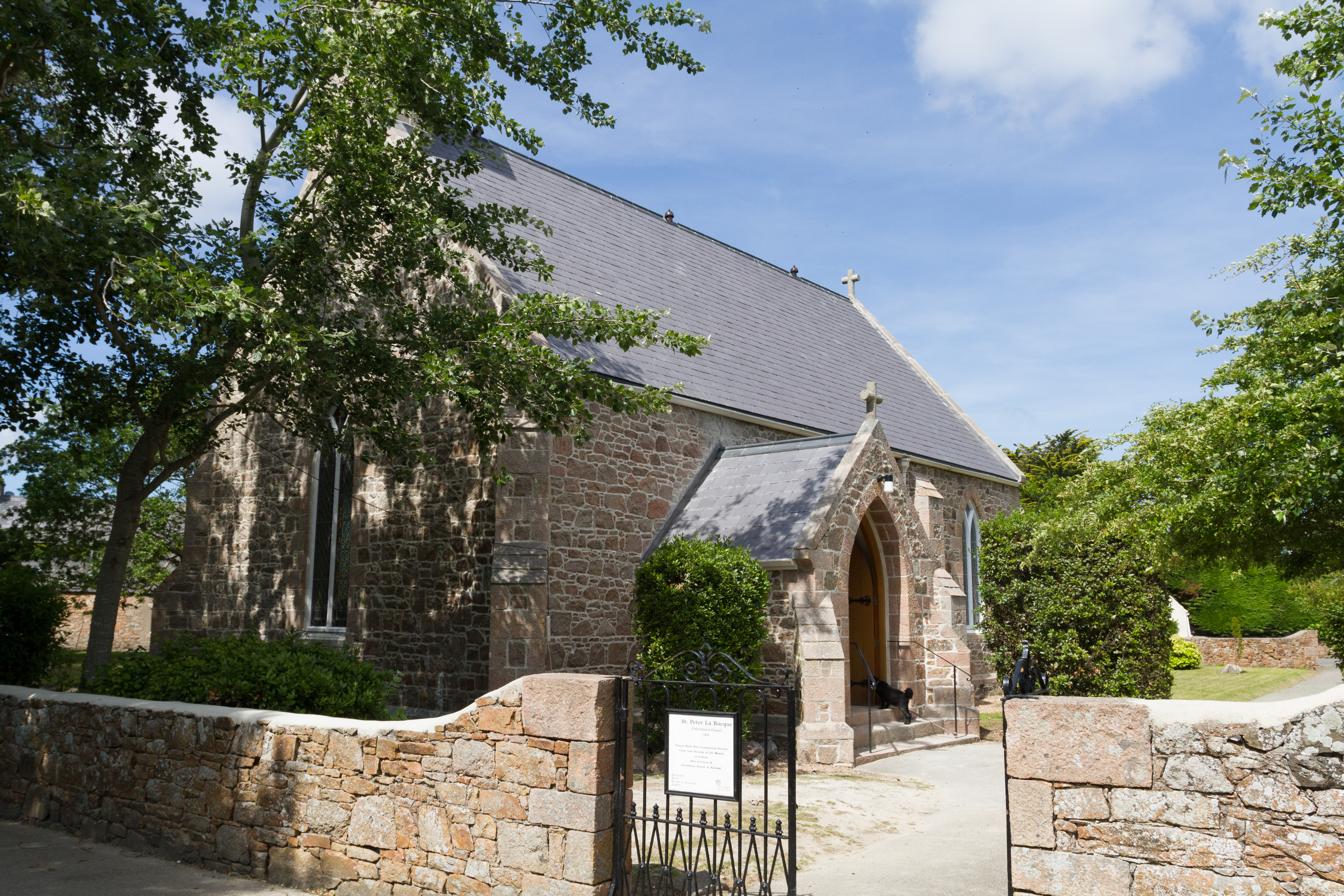
St Peter La Rocque chapel in 2013

St Peter La Rocque is an Anglican church in the Parish of Grouville, in Jersey.

It was built in 1852 to serve the fishing community which flourished at La Rocque, which was seen as necessary by the Rector of Grouville, Abraham Le Sueur. The location was intended to provide a church closer to the harbour at La Rocque than the Methodist church, then seen as a rival for the fishing congregation.

There have not been any structural alterations since it was built, but in the 1950s gifts were given including a carved oak eagle lectern, a sanctuary chair, and a priest's desk and chair.

== Bibliography ==
- The Bailliwick of Jersey, G.R. Balleine
- Jersey Churches by Paul Harrison
