= St Saviour, Jersey =

Parish in eastern Jersey

Coordinates: 49.19023°N 2.07916°W

St Saviour Saint Saûveux (Norman) Saint-Sauveur (French)
- Jersey parish
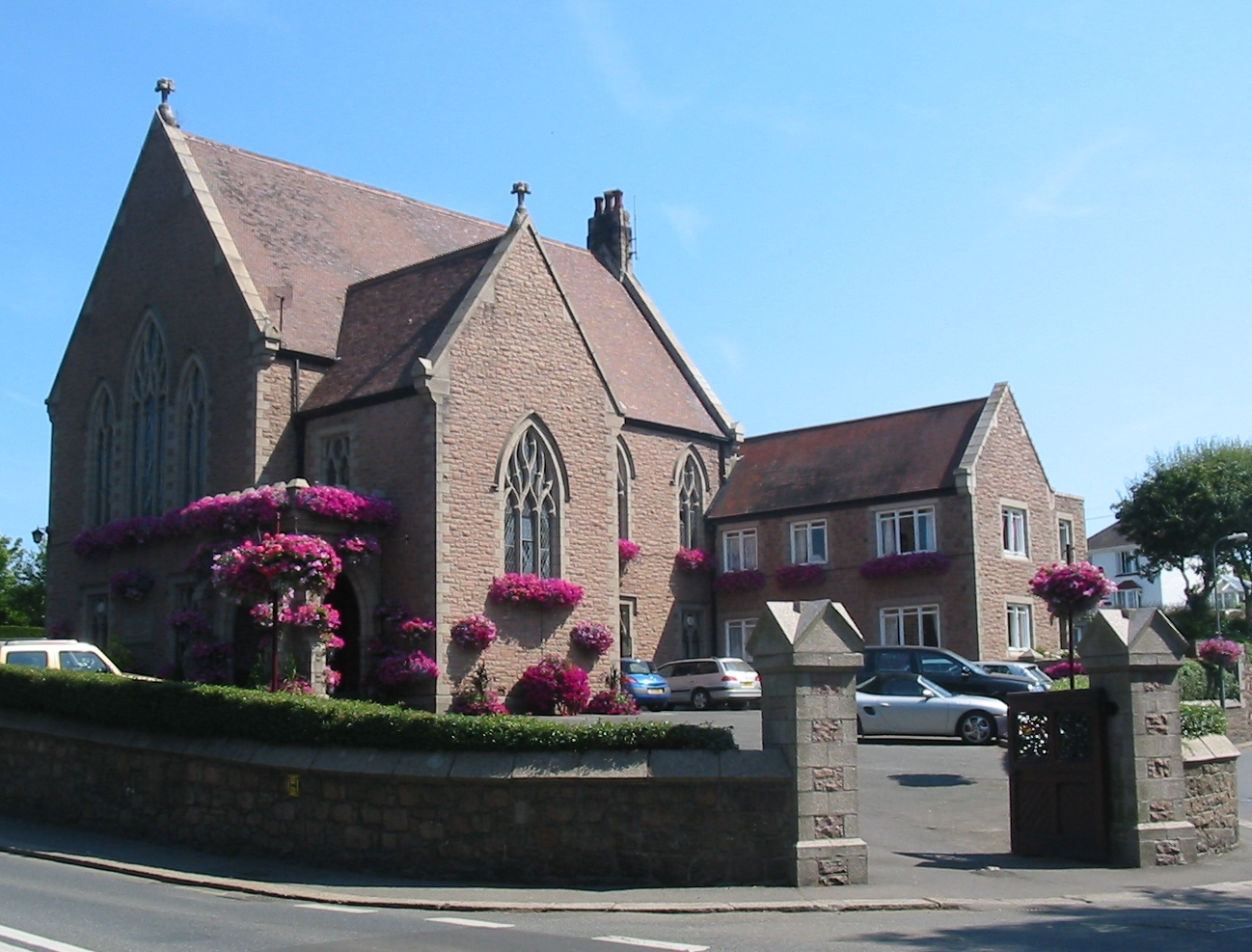
- Parish Hall of St Saviour

- Flag Coat of arms

- Location of St Saviour in Jersey
- Crown Dependency: Jersey, Channel Islands
- Headquarters: Parish Hall, St Saviour's Hill

Government
  - Connétable: Dave Curtis

Area
  - Total: 9.3 km^{2} (3.6 sq mi)
  - Rank: Ranked 8th

Population (2021)
  - Total: 13,904
  - Density: 1,500/km^{2} (3,900/sq mi)
- Time zone: GMT
  - Summer (DST): UTC+01
- Postcode district: JE2
- Postcode sector: 7
- Website: https://stsaviour.je/

St Saviour (Jèrriais: Saint Saûveux; French: Saint-Sauveur) is a parish of Jersey in the Channel Islands. It is located directly east of St Helier. It has a population of 13,904. It has a land surface area of 3.6 square miles (9.3 km^{2}) and has a very small coastline at Le Dicq.

The parish is quite urbanised, hosting the suburbs and exurbs for the town of St Helier. The most notable settlement is located around the Five Oaks area in the centre of the parish and Georgetown in the South. The village of Maufant is located on the boundary with St Martin.

== History ==
St Saviour is believed to be one of the oldest parishes in Jersey, dating back to around 475AD.

The parish's name derives from Jesus Christ as the Redeemer (Sanctus Salvator). The parish church's full dedication is to St Saviour of the Thorn.

The parish crest displays a thorn with three nails, to represent the Saviour's suffering.

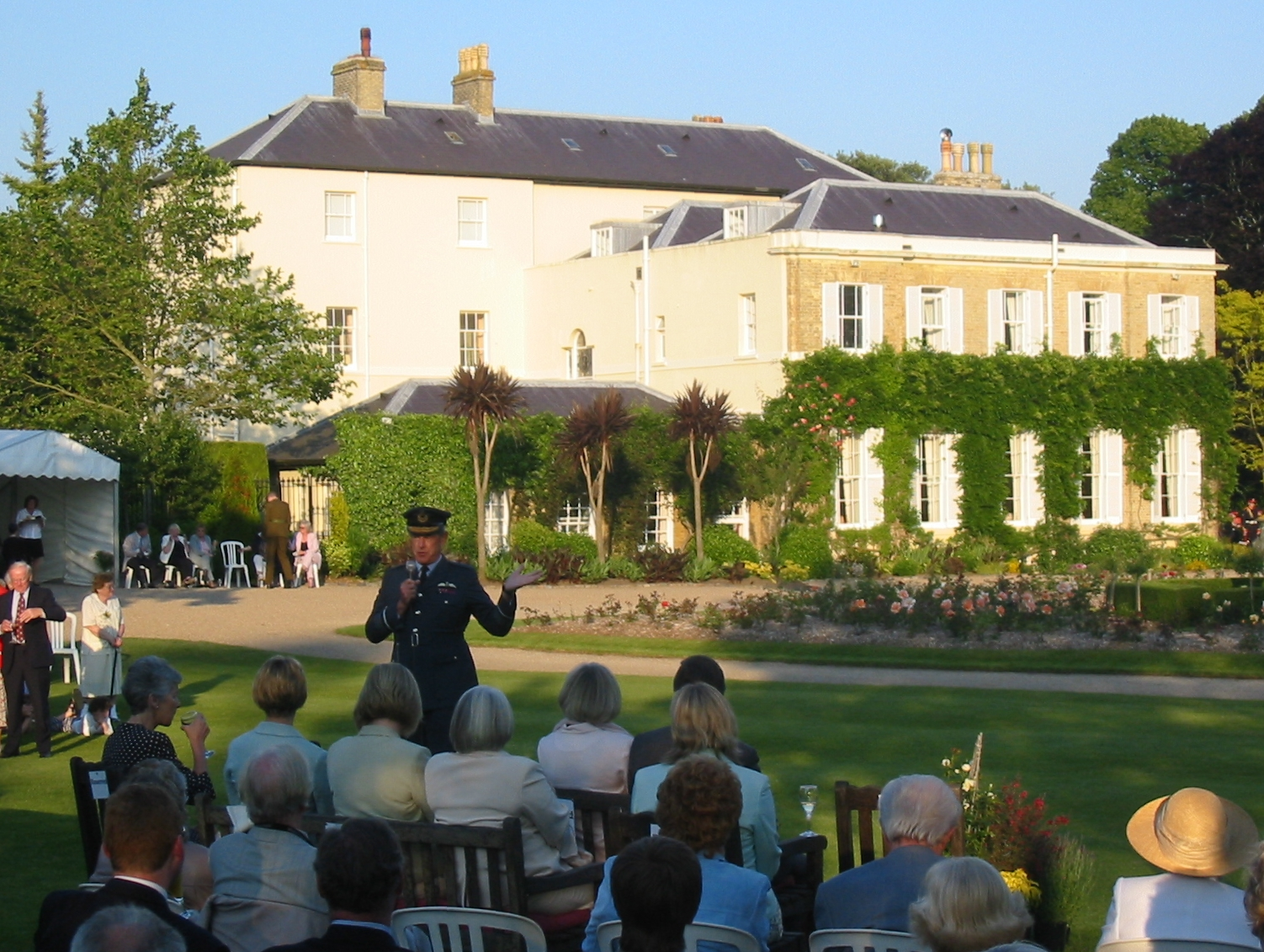
Government House, official residence of the Lieutenant-Governor, is situated in St Saviour

Government House is the official residence of the Lieutenant-Governor, the King's representative in Jersey. It was originally known as Belmont and was acquired in 1821. It was originally constructed in 1814.

The church and parish hall are located halfway along the road known as St Saviour's Hill. In the 19th century, the road was opened on its current route. Before then, the road ran through the current grounds of Government House. There was formerly an inn in what is now part of the cemetery of the church.

== Governance ==
St Saviour is one of 12 parishes (first-level administrative divisions) of the Bailiwick of Jersey, a self-governing British Crown dependency. The highest official in the parish is the Connétable of St Saviour. The parish administration is headquartered at the Parish Hall, next to the parish church. The incumbent office holder is Dave Curtis, who has held the office since 2026. A complete chronological record of those who have held this office can be found in the List of Constables for St Saviour.

Under the newly revised electoral reform (in effect since 2026), St Saviour forms a single constituency and elects four representatives to the States Assembly, alongside a connétable. The current vingteniers and deputies for St Saviour are listed below:

Vingtaines of St Saviour
District	Vingteniers
La Vingtaine de la Petite Longueville	M Hawgood
La Vingtaine de Sous l'Église	N Tanner
La Vingtaine de Maufant	S Hardy
La Vingtaine de Sous la Hougue	A Goncalves
La Vingtaine des Pigneaux	D Hallam

Deputies (elected 7 June 2026)

- Malcolm Ferey
- Louise Doublet
- Chris Leck
- Robert Parker

== Geography ==
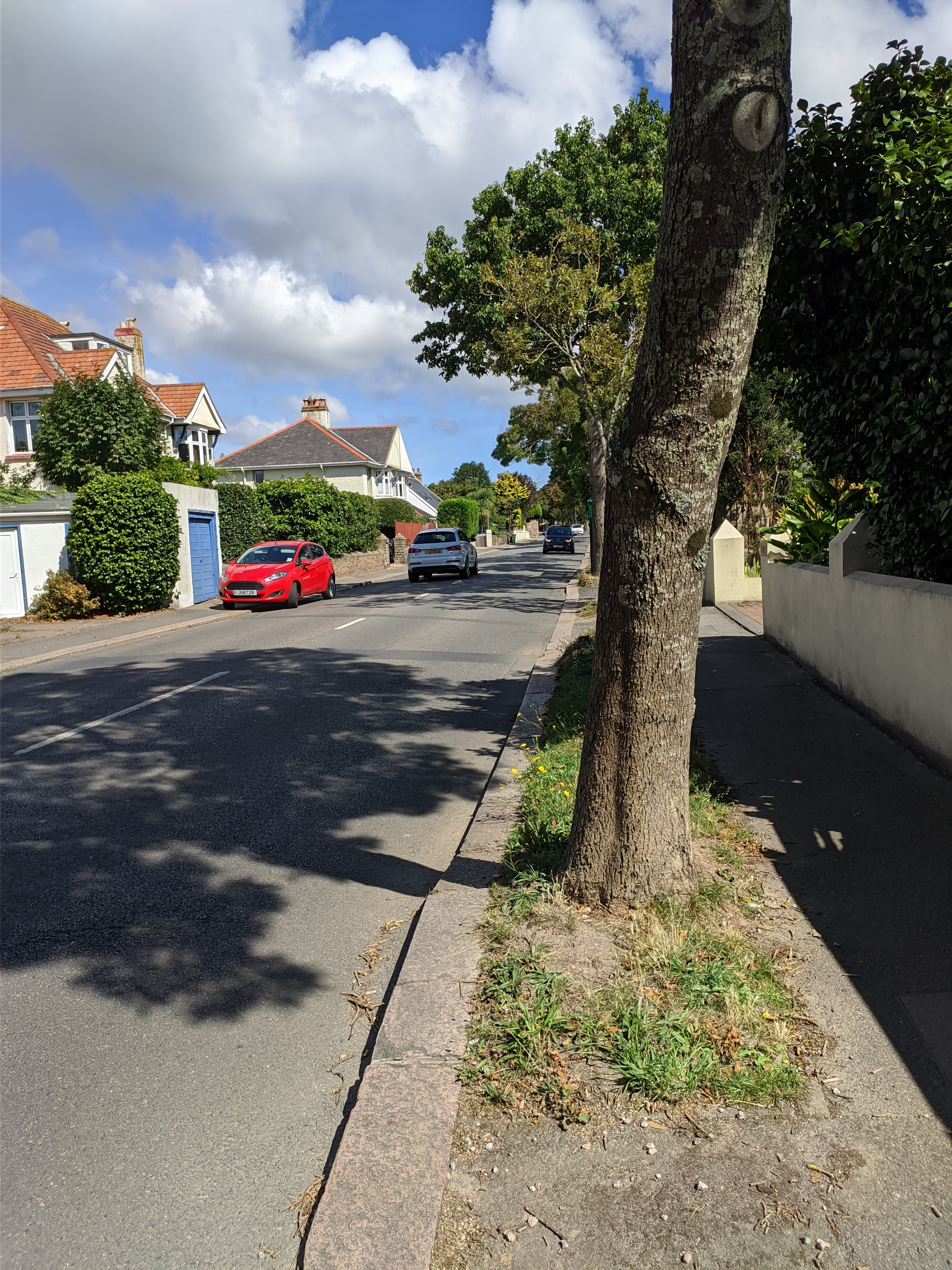
Bagatelle Road in St Saviour

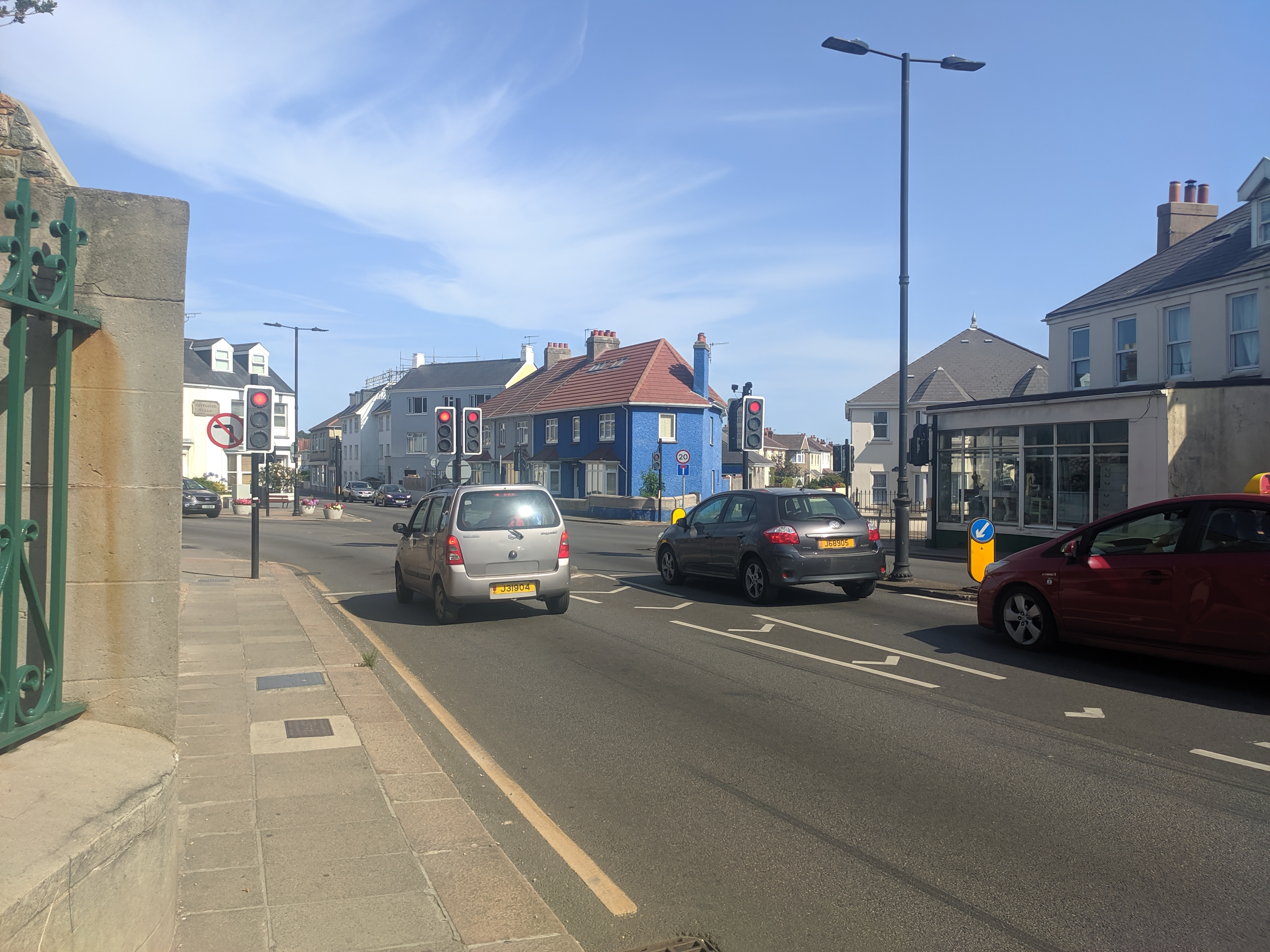
Georgetown is in the south part of St Saviour

St Saviour is in the east of the island of Jersey. It borders Trinity, St Martin, Grouville, St Clement and St Helier. The south of the parish is a highly urbanised part of town, focused around Georgetown and Five Oaks. The area in the south is known as Georgetown, Plat Douet and Longueville. It is near Howard Davis Park and has a short piece of coastline, the only one in the parish. It is also home to the Rue des Près Trading Estate. The Five Oaks area is home to many schools and suburban housing for St Helier. The remainder of the parish is largely rural, save for a few small developments such as Maufant Village (split between St Saviour and St Martin) and the houses near Queen's Valley Reservoir. The Grands Vaux reservoir runs along the border of St Saviour and St Helier.

In terms of transport, the parish has many main roads that run through the parish to connect to other parishes, such as La Grande Route de St Martin and Longueville Road. Part of the St Helier Ring Road is located within St Saviour. The parish does not have any green lanes. The parish's Connétable Sadie Le Sueur-Rennard said 'I can't see where we would have a green lane', although the parish has a large number of lanes (including lanes that border green lanes in St Martin).

St Saviour is twinned with Villedieu-les-Poêles, Normandy.

== Demography ==
St Saviour is Jersey's second most populated parish, with 13,580 residents in 2011.

Historical population
Year	Pop.	±%
1991	12,747	—
1996	12,680	−0.5%
2001	12,491	−1.5%
2011	13,580	+8.7%
2021	13,904	+2.4%

== Religious sites ==
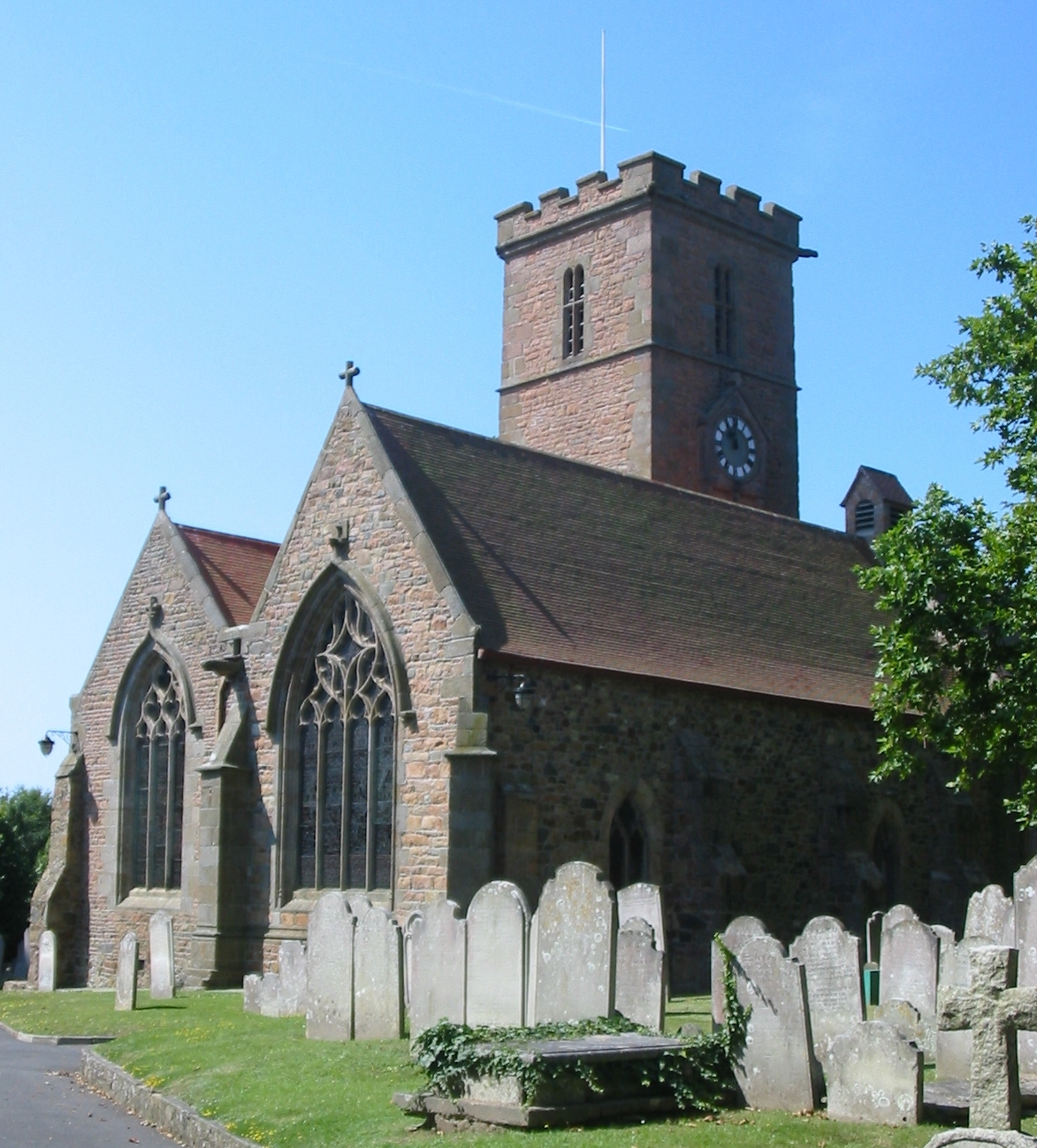
St Saviour's Church

The parish church is Saint-Sauveur de l'Epine (St Saviour of the Thorn) and is dedicated to Jesus Christ. The parish church existed at least as early as 1087. Each originally had four separate chapels, dedicated to Jesus, St John, St Martin and Mary, mother of Jesus. Before 1145, connecting walls were built to create the parish church. The central tower was built in the 14th century. The parish rector is uniquely known as 'Rector and Vicar' or 'Perpetual Curate'. The church has four bells, the oldest dating to 1656, the other three dating to 1968. Within its precincts, when plague was raging in 1563, the Royal Court of Jersey found a refuge, by permission granted of Hugh Perrin, on whose fief the building stood. Extensive repairs took place on the church in the late 19th and early 20th centuries. It is the best known of the Jersey churches outside the island because of the link to Lillie Langtry, whose father was rector of the church. She is buried in the churchyard, which is the largest of any of the island's parish churches, owing to the generosity of the Connétable in 1844.

Elsewhere in the parish is the Anglican church of St Luke's near Howard Davis Park. It is one of only three in the island to celebrate in the tradition of High Church Anglicanism. Due to population growth after the Napoleonic Wars, a new ecclesiastical district was created for Havre des Pas, with the new church completed in 1851. In the park next to the church, there is a war cemetery dedicated to the servicemen who lost their lives off Guernsey in HMS Charybidis and HMS Limbourne.

== Landmarks ==
- Government House
- Grainville Playing Fields
- St Saviour's Church
- Howard Davis Park
- Rue des Près Trading Estate
- Highalnds College Turner Building
- College House (Jersey College for Girls)
- Longueville Manor

== Education ==
The parish is home to a very large number of schools. Many of the schools have an island-wide student body, and therefore during school pick-up and drop-off times the roads in the parish can become very congested.

- Private schools:
  - De La Salle College
  - De La Sallle Primary School
  - FCJ Primary School
  - St Michael's Preparatory School
- States schools (fee-paying):
  - Jersey College for Girls
  - Jersey College Preparatory School
- States schools (all-island)
  - Highlands College - the island's further education college
  - Hautlieu School - a grammar school (Year 10–11) and Sixth Form
  - D'Hautree School
- States schools (catchment)
  - Grainville School
  - Plat Douet School
  - St Luke's School
  - St Saviour's School

== Notable people ==
- Jack Butel (born 1996), British racing driver
- Lillie Langtry (1853–1929), British-American socialite, actress and producer from St Saviour
- Agnes Harben (1879–1961), British suffragist
- The Misses Corbett, Grace (c. 1765/1770–1843) and Walterina (died 1837), Scottish poets and authors

== Gallery ==
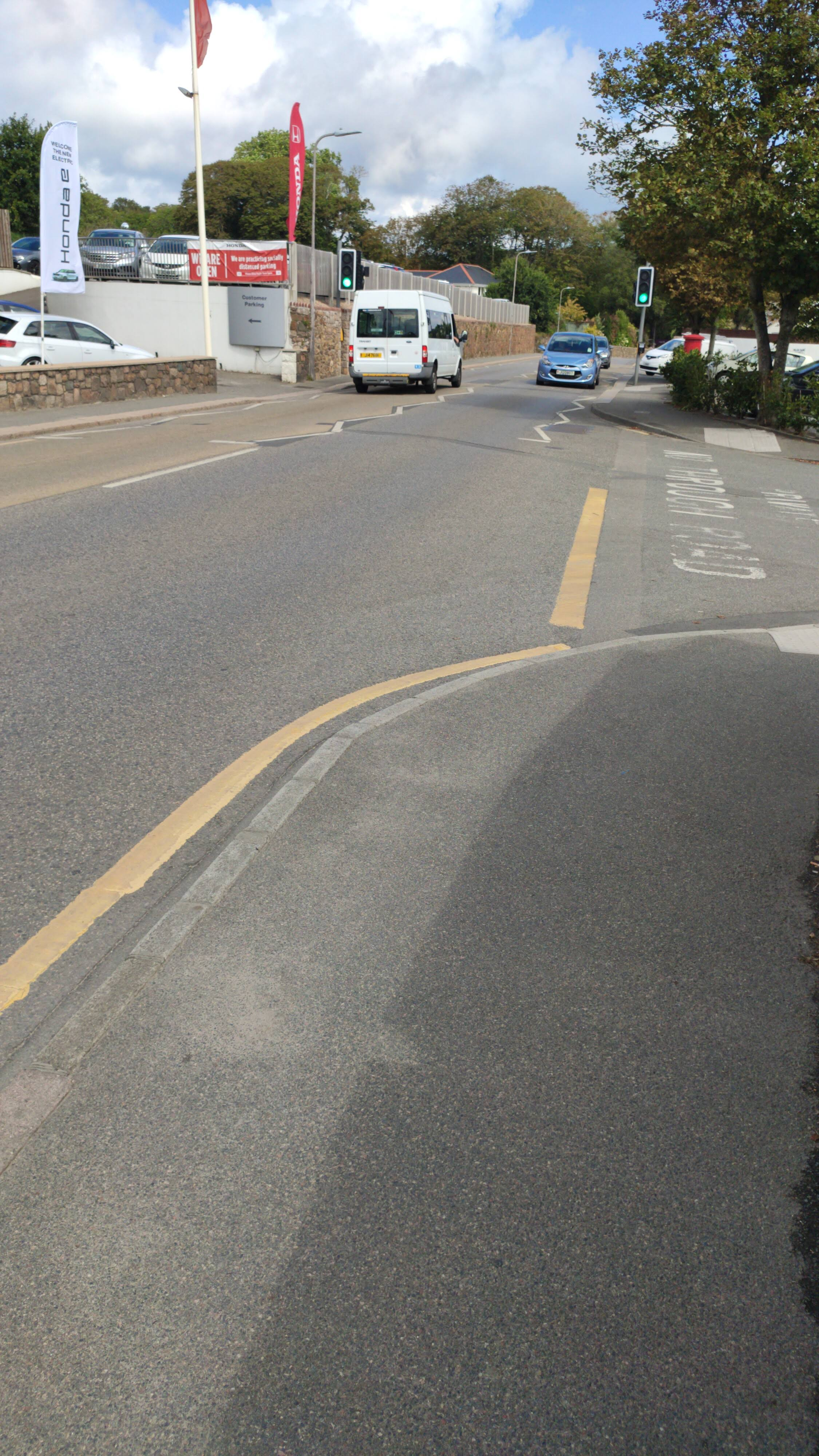
Longueville in St Saviour

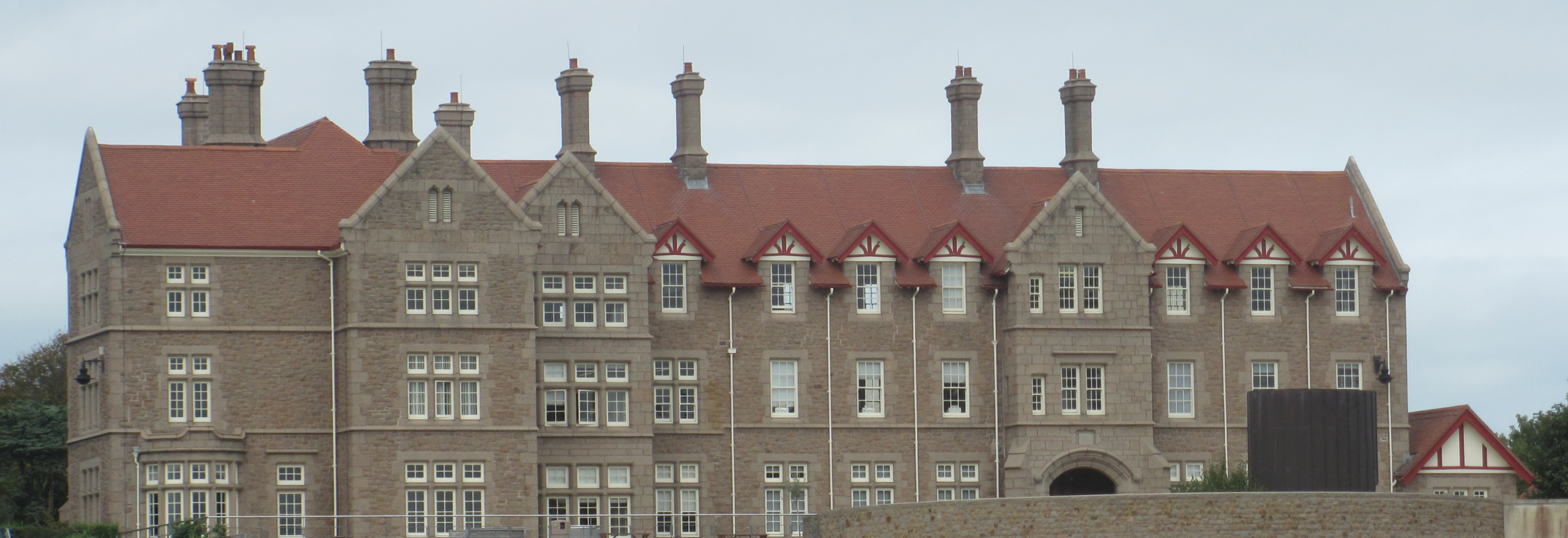
College House, formerly the boarding house of Victoria College

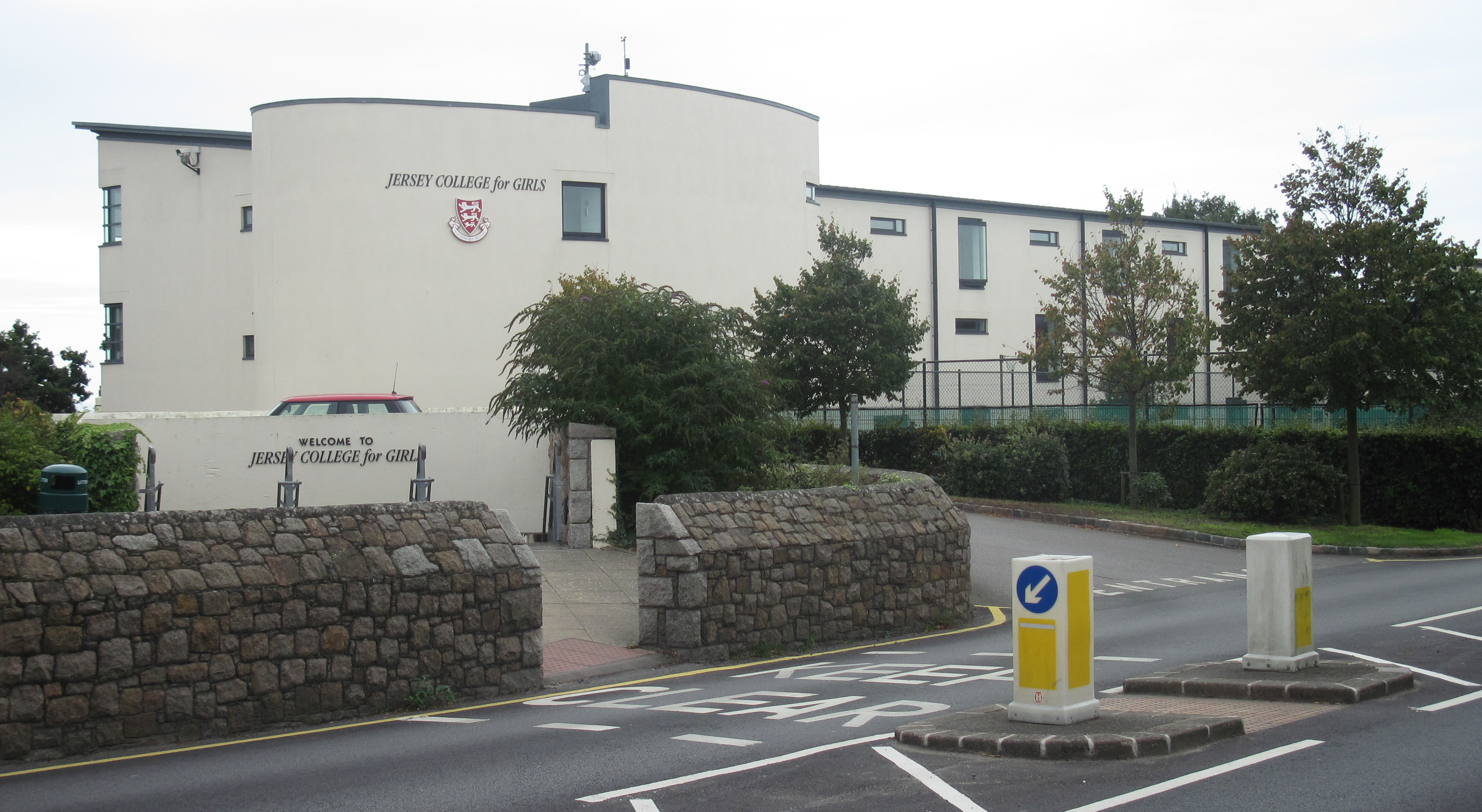
JCG is a government-maintained fee-paying selective school located in the parish

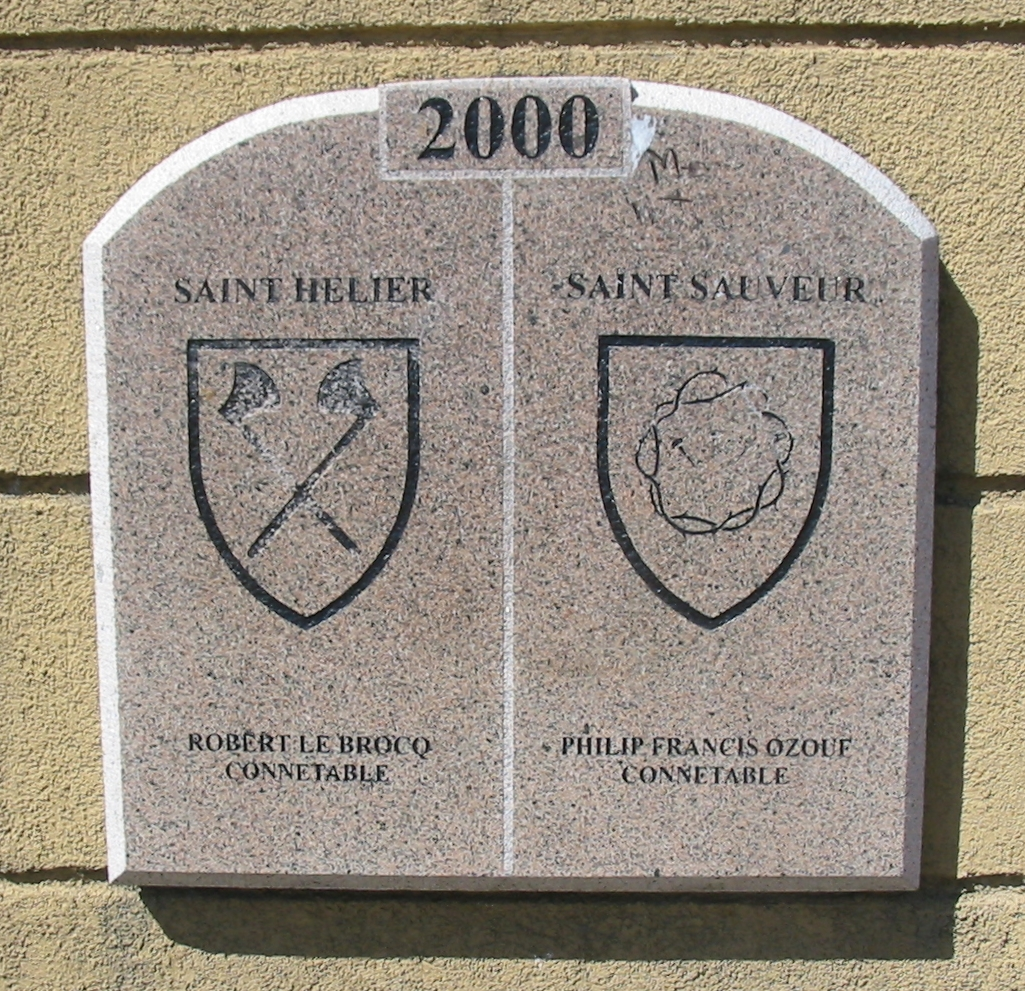
Boundary stone between St Saviour and St Helier on La Rue Le Masurier

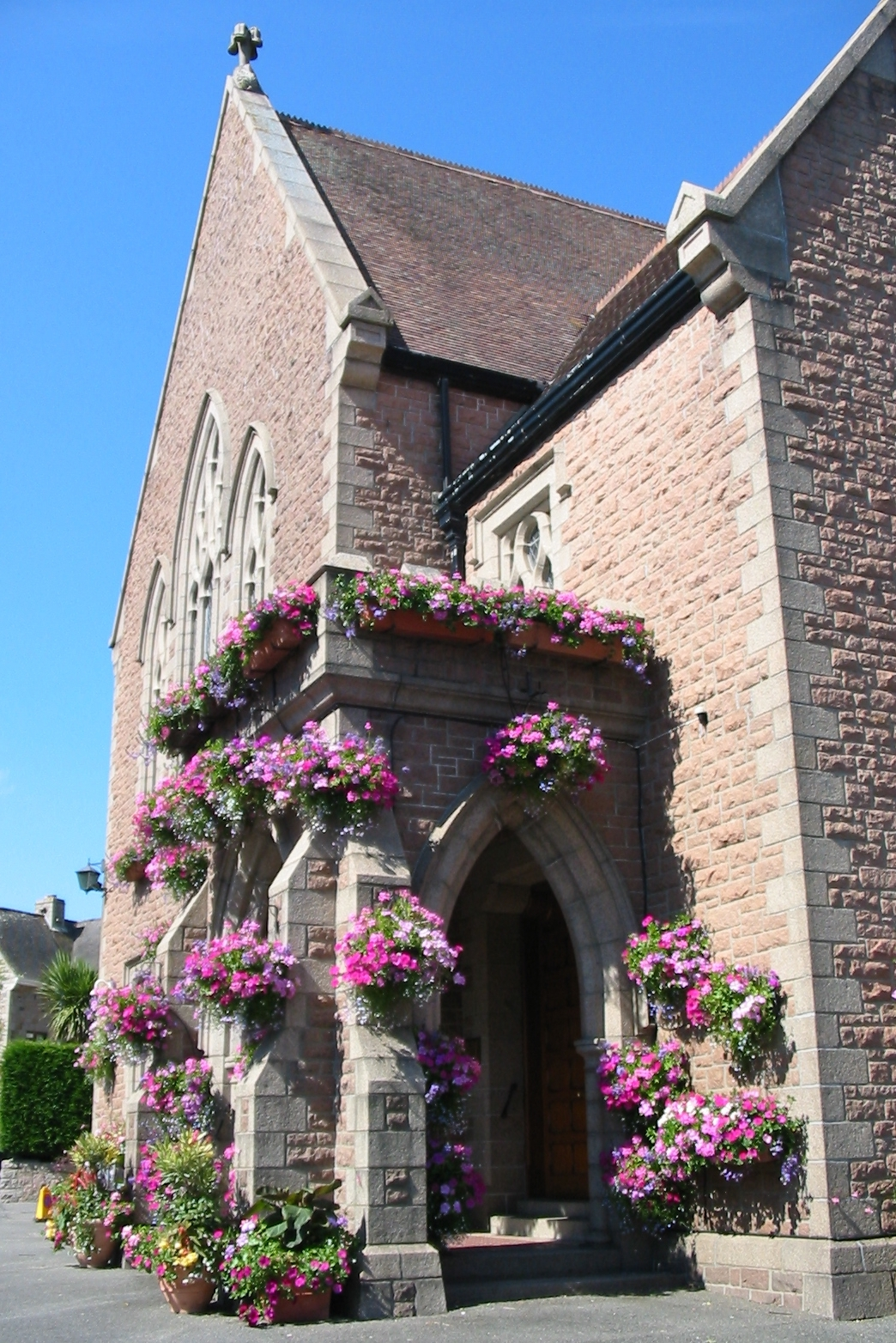
Parish Hall

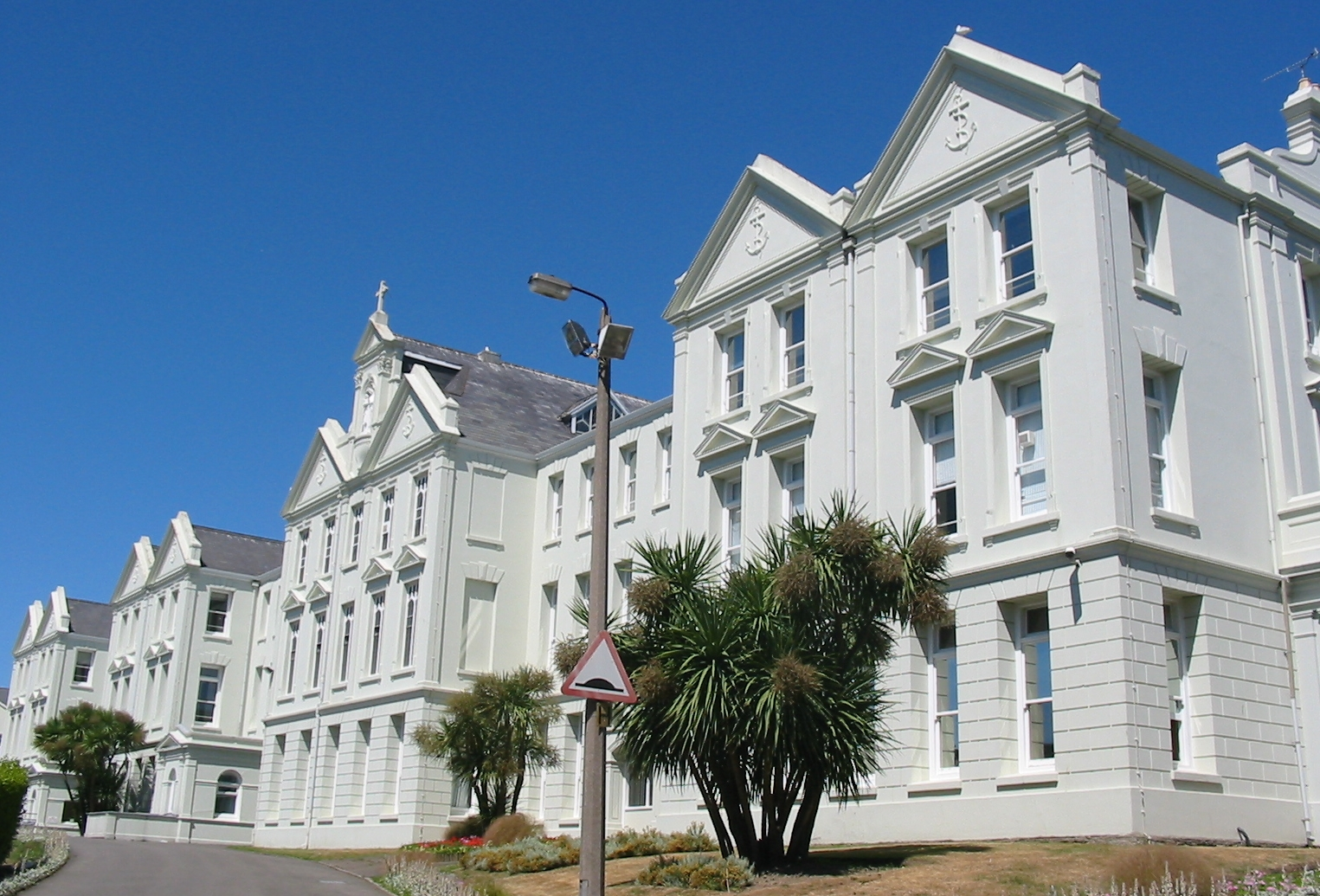
Highlands College

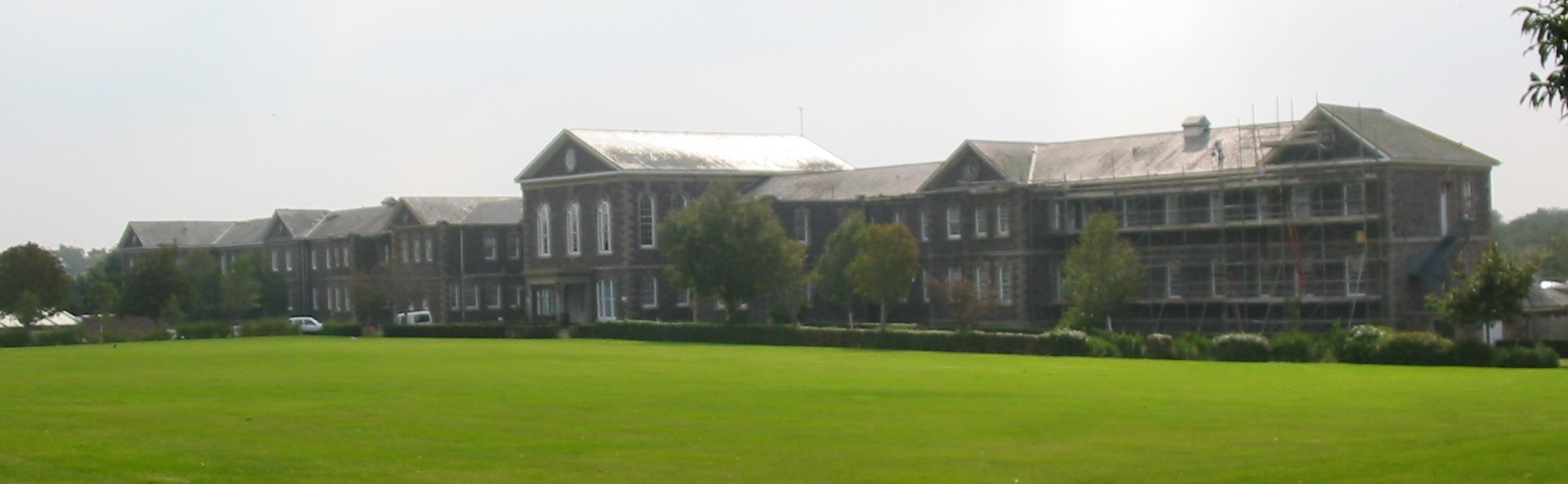
St Saviour's Hospital in St Saviour

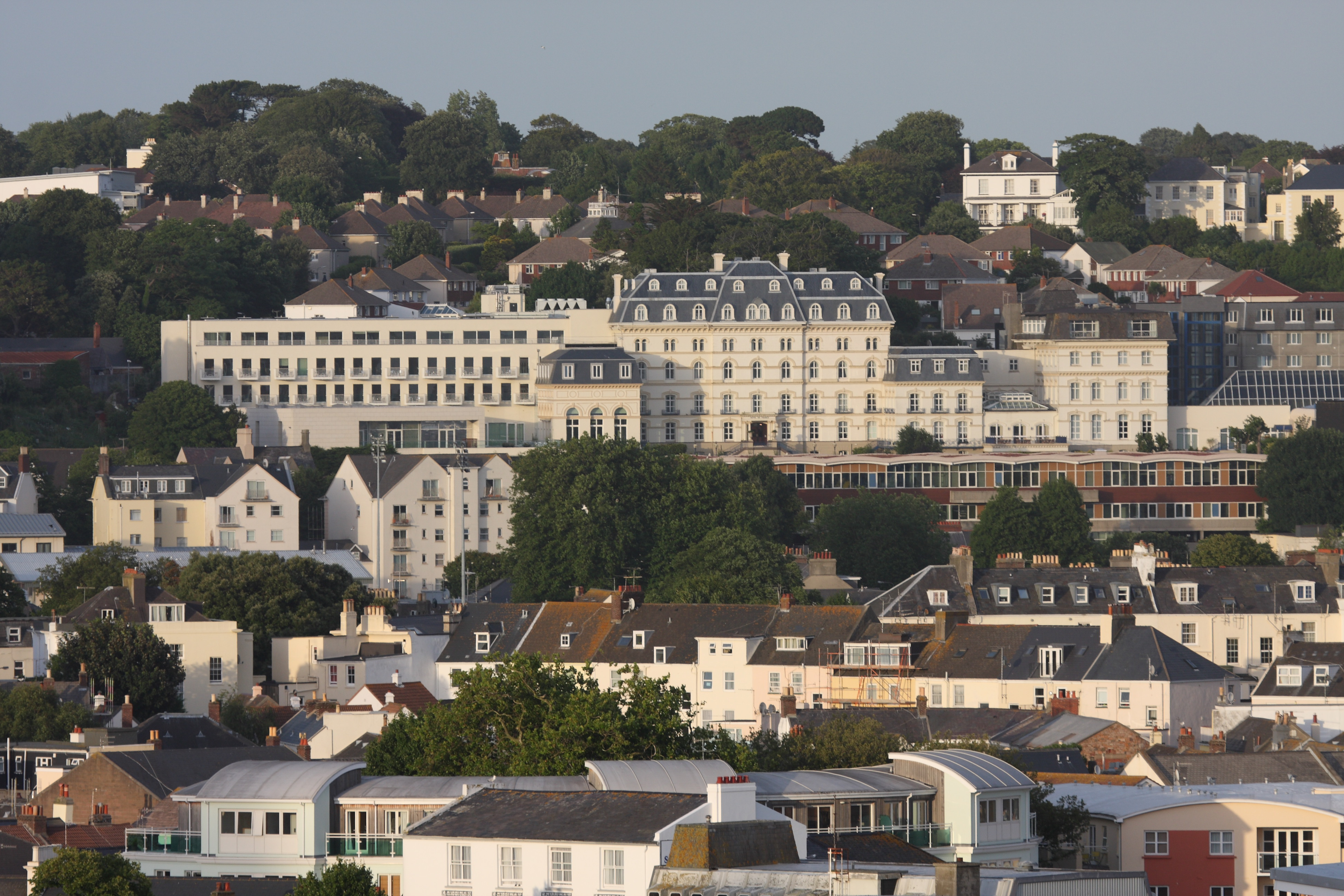
The Hotel de France on St Saviour's Road
