= Grouville =

- Jersey parish
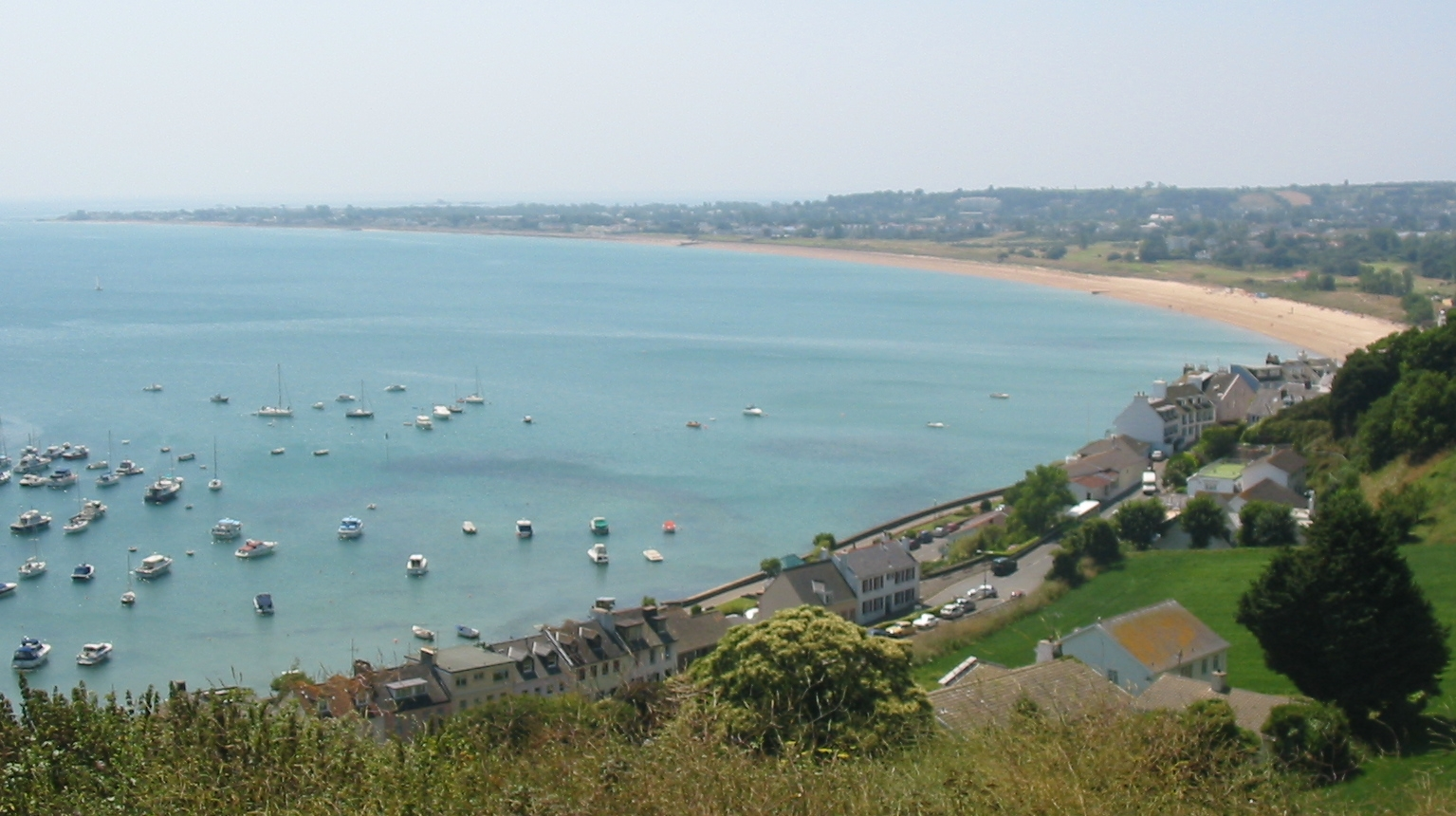
- View south across the Royal Bay of Grouville

- Flag Coat of arms

- Location of Grouville in Jersey
- Coordinates: 49.18888°N 2.04569°W
- Crown Dependency: Jersey, Channel Islands

Government
  - Connétable: John Le Maistre

Area
  - Total: 7.8 km^{2} (3.0 sq mi)
  - Rank: Ranked 10th

Population (2011)
  - Total: 4,866
  - Density: 620/km^{2} (1,600/sq mi)
- Time zone: GMT
  - Summer (DST): UTC+01
- Postcode district: JE3
- Postcode sector: 9
- Website: www.parish.gov.je/grouville/

Grouville is one of the twelve parishes of Jersey in the Channel Islands. The parish is around 3.9 kilometres (2.4 mi) east of St Helier. The parish covers a surface area of 4,354 vergées (7.8 km^{2}). The parish includes the south-east portion of the main island of the Bailiwick of Jersey, as well as the Minquiers islets several miles to the south, and is dominated by the broad sweep of the Royal Bay of Grouville. It borders St. Clement, St. Saviour and St. Martin.

== History ==
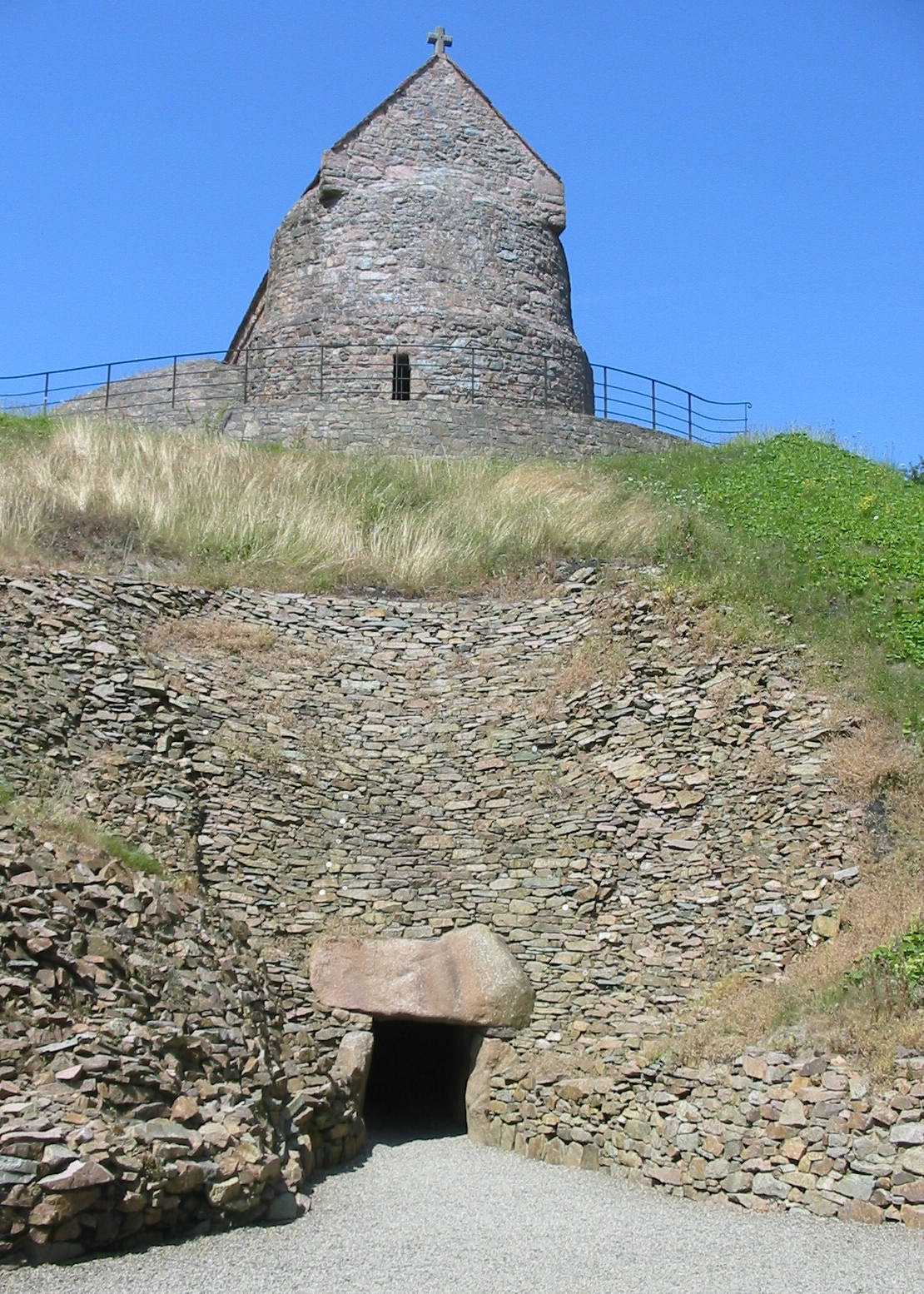
Restoration work has reconstructed the entrance to the passage tomb of La Hougue Bie. The chapel sits on top of the mound

The parish of Grouville shares, with the neighbouring parish of St. Martin, a dedication to St. Martin of Tours. The ecclesiastical parish and parish church are dedicated to "St. Martin de Grouville" to distinguish them from the parish of St. Martin (historically 'St. Martin le Vieux'). The Church of St Peter la Rocque was built in the 19th century.

The name 'Grouville' may derive from:

- the small community established in what is now the parish by St Gerou (also known as Gervold or Geraldius), an ecclesiastical troubleshooter in the employ of Charlemagne in the 9th century AD;
- Gros Villa (great farm)
- Geirr, the Viking leader after whom the Island may be named.

The name Groult or Gueroult is often found today in Normandy and is believed to derive from the ancient probably Norman name Gueroalt (Geirroalt)

The Royal Bay of Grouville gained its royal epithet when it impressed Queen Victoria during her visit in 1846. The bay is popular with tourists for its broad sandy beach and shallow, warm water. It is also the main oyster producing area of Jersey, and was also formerly noted for the production of vraic (seaweed fertiliser). The cottage industry formerly practised by Grouvillais of burning vraic gave rise to the traditional nickname of les Enfuntchis (the smoky ones, or the dim ones, in Jèrriais) shared by the Grouvillais and their neighbours in St. Clement.

Inland, the parish is also home to Jersey's most noted archaeological site at La Hougue Bie, now a museum run by the Jersey Heritage Trust. A prehistoric artificial mound covers a passage grave aligned for the equinox. A mediaeval chapel, Notre Dame de la Clarté, built on the Neolithic mound was converted in the 18th century to a folly-like Gothic Revival residence, the Prince's Tower (demolished in the 1920s). During the German occupation of the Channel Islands in the Second World War, the German forces and imported labourers constructed bunkers in and alongside the ancient mound, now also transformed for museum interpretation.

La Rocque was the site of the landing of the French forces on 6 January 1781. The skirmish at La Platte Rocque was ancillary to the Battle of Jersey.

== Governance ==
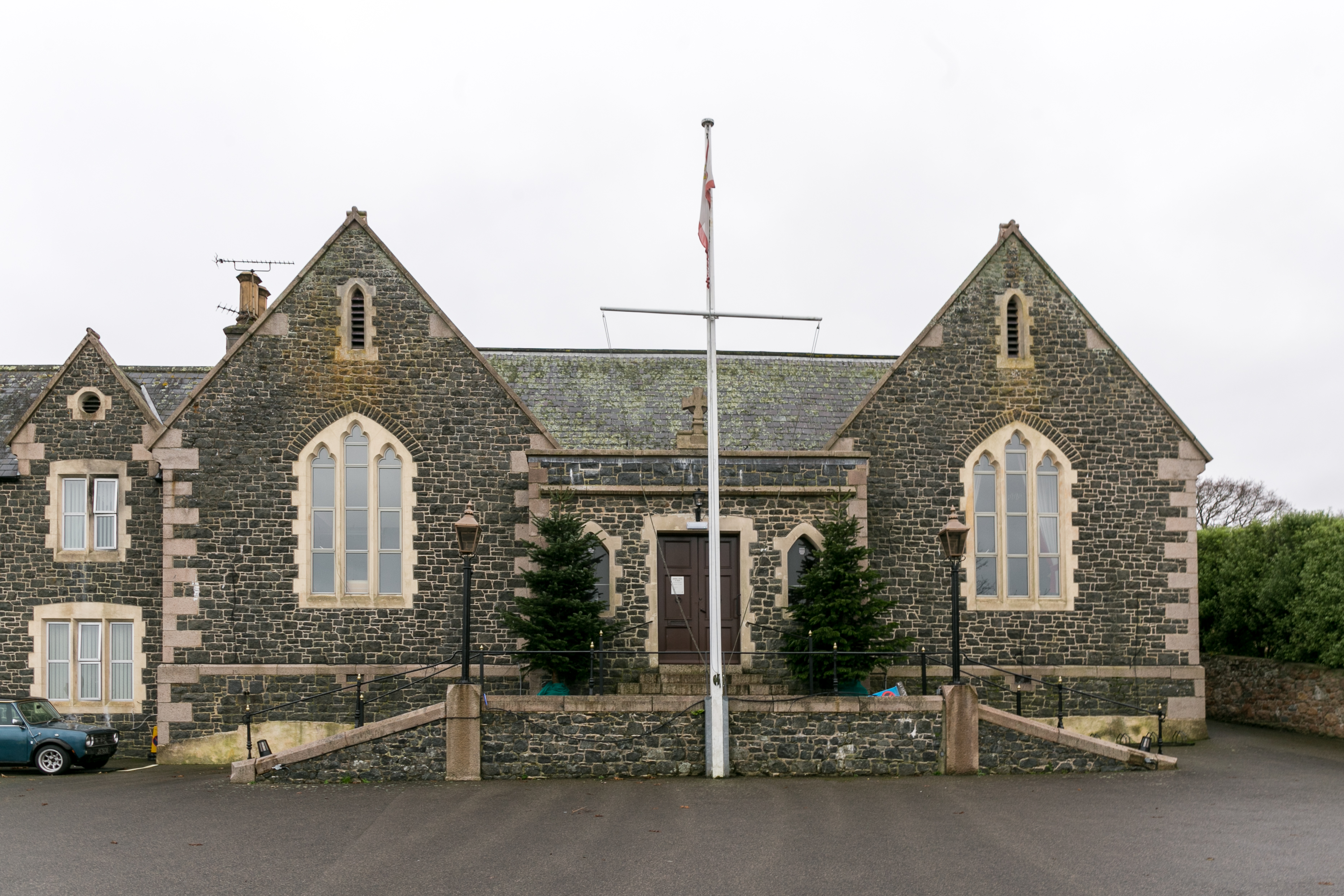
Grouville parish hall

The parish is a first-level administrative division of the Bailiwick of Jersey, a British Crown dependency. The highest official in the parish is the Connétable of Grouville. The incumbent office holder is John Le Maistre, who has held the office since 2013. The parish administration is headquartered at the Parish Hall next to the parish church.

At present, the parish forms one electoral district for States Assembly elections and elects one Deputy, as well as eight Senators in an islandwide constituency. The current Deputy for Grouville is Carolyn Labey. Under the proposed electoral reform, it will form part of the North East electoral district consisting of St. Martin and Grouville, which will collectively elect three representatives (the least of any constituency) alongside the parishes' Connétables.

Grouville is divided for administrative purposes into vingtaines as follows:

- La Vingtaine des Marais
- La Vingtaine de la Rue
- La Vingtaine de Longueville
- La Vingtaine de la Rocque

== Geography ==
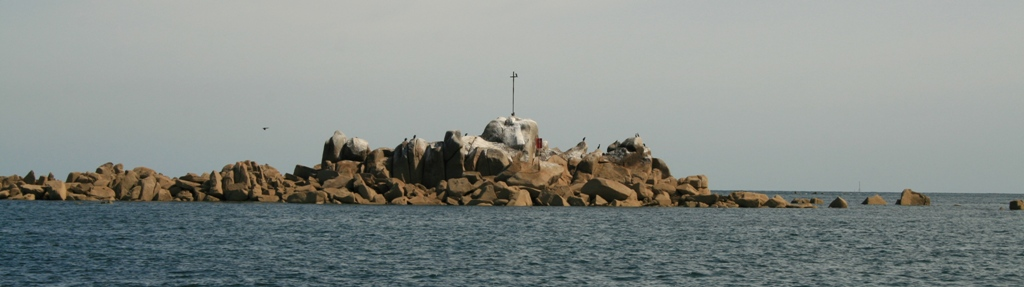
The Minquiers are in Grouville

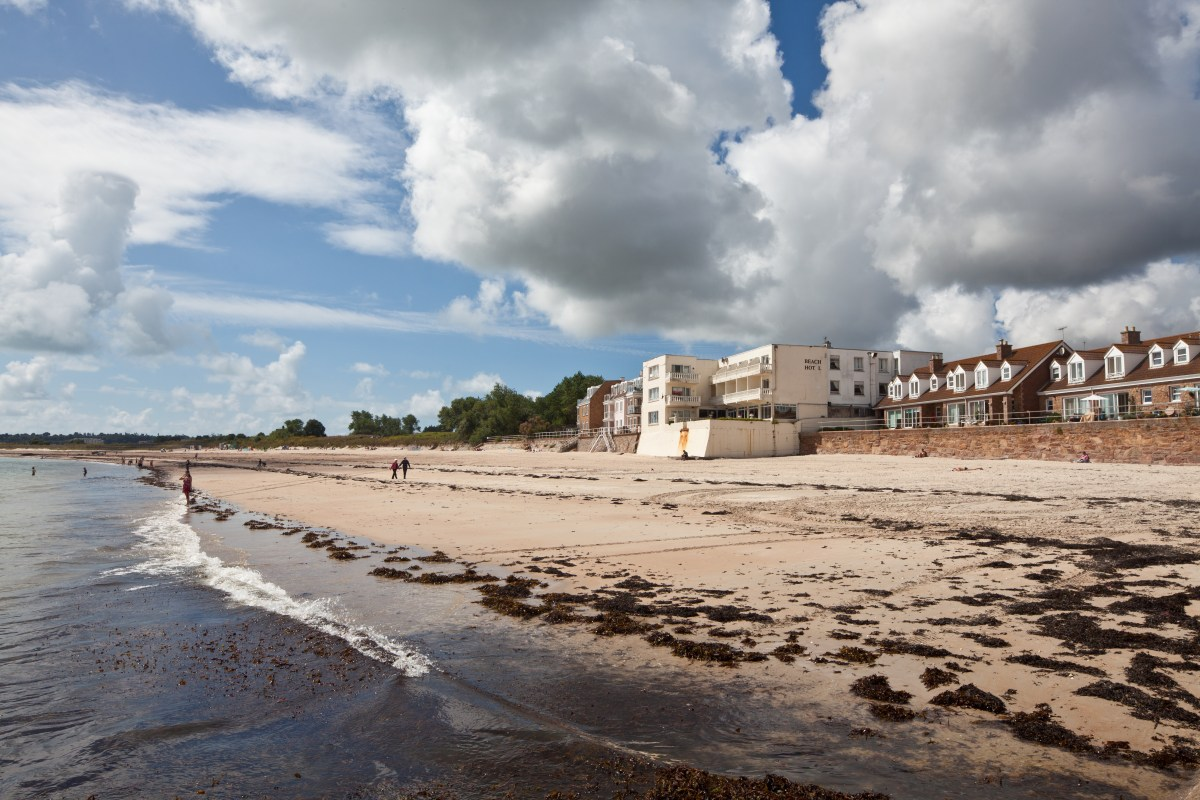
Homes along the beach

The main part of the parish is in the south-east of the island of Jersey, part of the Channel Islands archipelago. It borders St. Clement, St. Saviour and St. Martin. The parish hall is located around 3.9 kilometres (2.4 mi) east of the Royal Square in St Helier. The parish is dominated by the sweeping Royal Bay of Grouville (part of which is often called Gorey Bay), stretching from Mont Orgeuil Castle in St. Martin, which dominates the skyline to the north, out to the sea in the south at La Rocque. It is the third smallest parish, only measuring 8 square kilometres (4560 vergées). The Minquiers are also part of the parish of Grouville.

The parish is quite urbanised, with 22% of the parish built-up, but is also quite an agricultural parish. Its mix of land uses can be compared closely to that of St. Lawrence. The parish population is mostly located along the coastal part to the east of La Grande Route des Sablons along the coast, with the 'village centre' of the parish located at Ville-ès-Renauds, which has a number of shops and the parish school. Further inland, the parish rises up to the Mont de Grouville. The parish church and hall are located further inland at the foot of the hill along the main road to St. Helier. The parish also includes the more residential 'village' part of Gorey, with the more touristic 'pier' part in St. Martin.

== Demography ==
Historical population
Year	Pop.	±%
1991	4,297	—
1996	4,658	+8.4%
2001	4,702	+0.9%
2011	4,866	+3.5%

== Culture and community ==
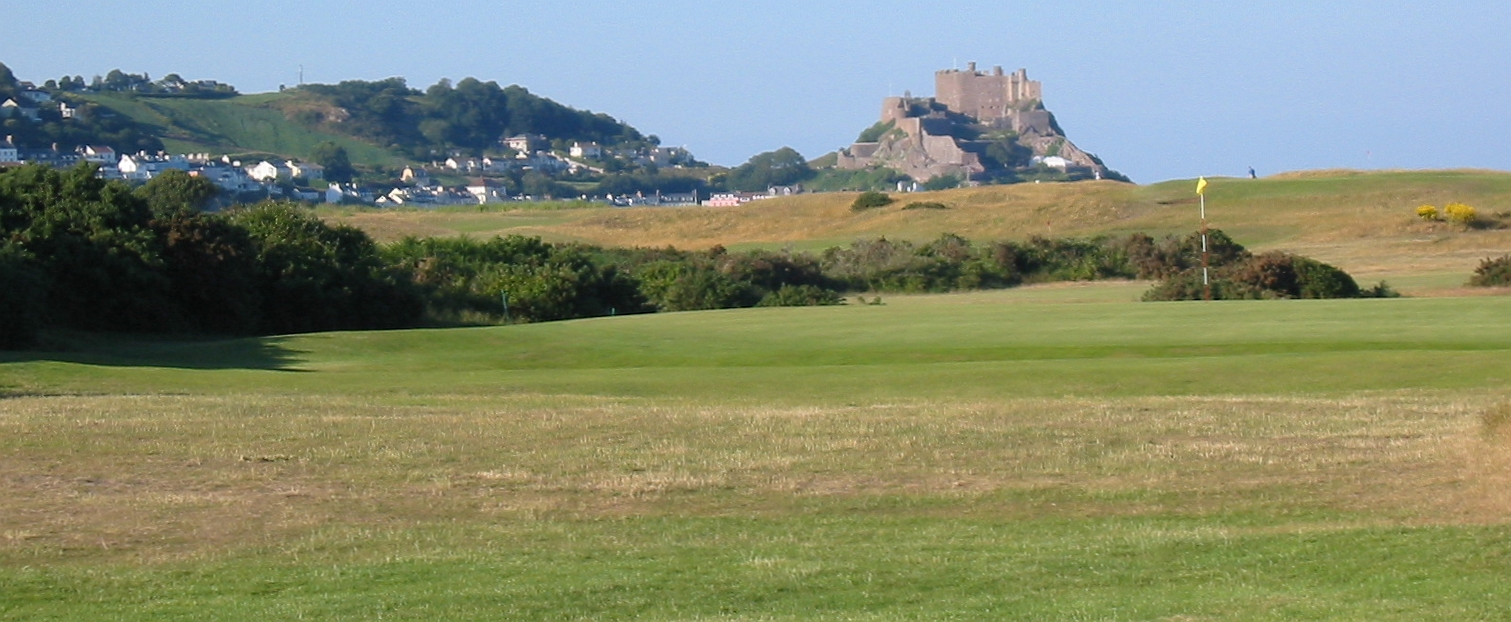
Mont Orgeuil dominates the skyline over the Royal Golf Club

The parish is makes up the majority of the catchment area for its namesake primary school, however which also takes students from a small part of St. Martin. Grouville Primary School is a feeder school for Le Rocquier.

The parish features a large golf course, known as the Royal Jersey Golf Course, however lacks any other significant sporting facilities.

== Economy ==
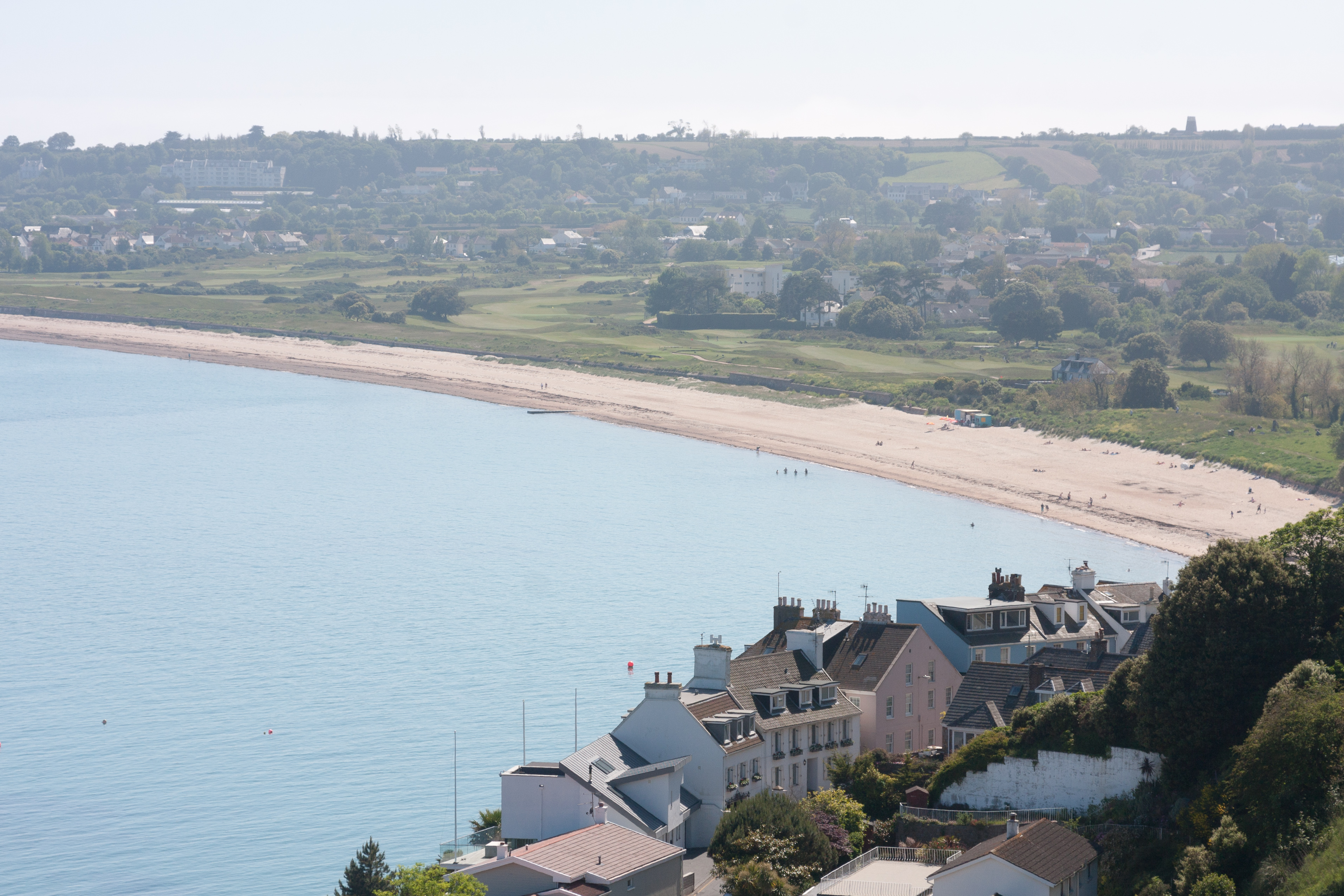
Royal Bay of Grouville

In modern times, Grouville has been a popular holiday destination, and features a number of hotels. These include the Beausite Hotel, which is a later 20th-century structure but incorporates a small structure dating back to 1636 which now serves as the hotel's bar.

== Landmarks ==
The Royal Jersey Golf Club is located on Grouville Common. It was founded in 1878 and granted its royal charter by Queen Victoria. The Pembroke Hotel, near the 16th tee, was a former clubhouse, once called the 'Golf Inn'. During the Occupation, the course was turned into a mine field. There are two German gun emplacements along the opening hole. The club's most famous player is Harry Vardon; he won the Open Championship a record six times.

Within the Royal Bay, there are a number of Martello towers, built during the Napoleonic Wars, including the offshore Seymour and Icho towers.

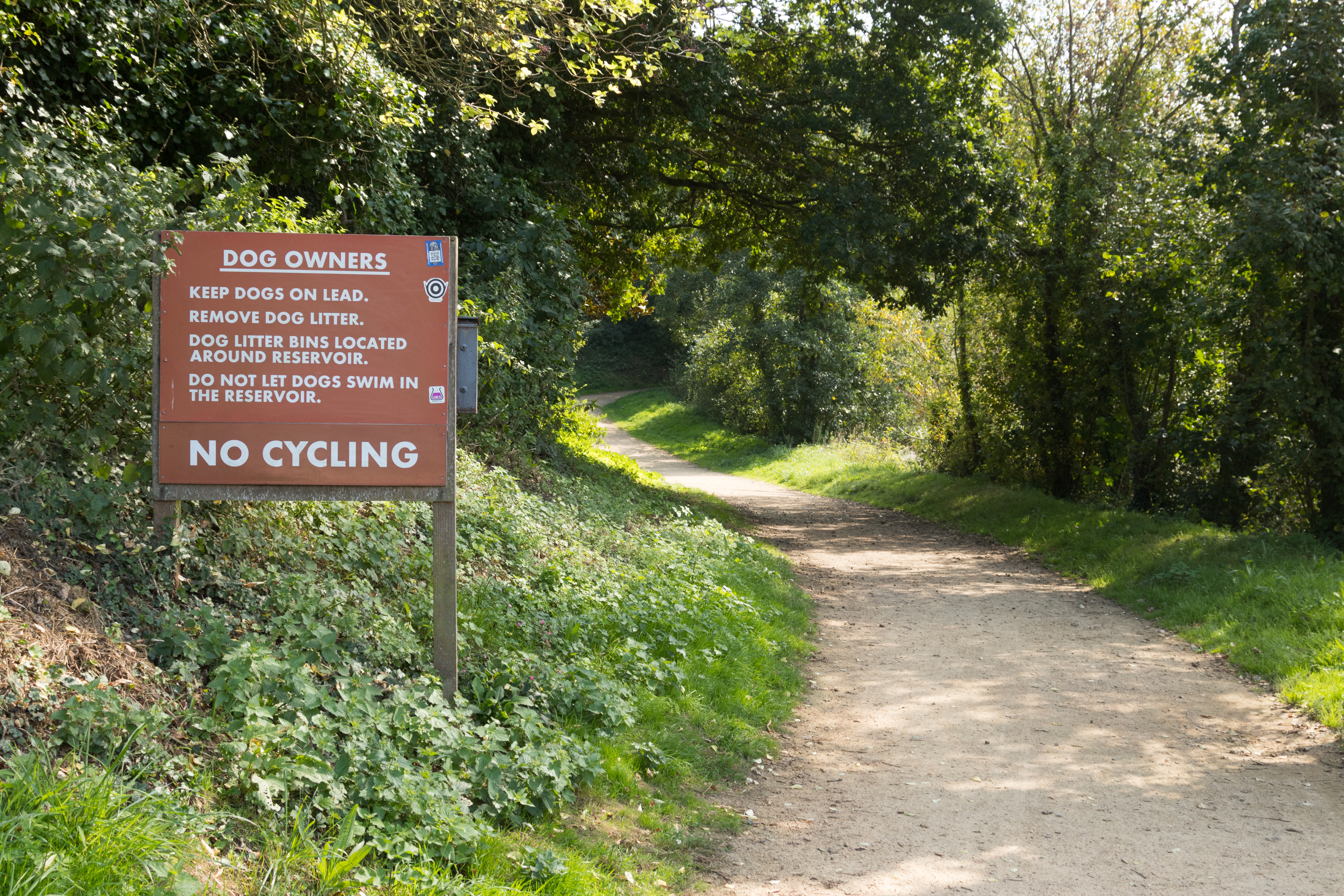
Queen's Valley offers an encircling walk

Queen's Valley (French: La Vallée des Moulins) is located in the north of the parish, very partly shared with St Saviour. In 1987, it was described as "left unspoiled, with just one very minor road traversing it". There were once three water mills along its length, recorded as early 1274. Both Victor Hugo and George Eliot have written about the valley.

In 1976, the Jersey water company proposed to flood the valley to increase water storage capacity. This was met with protests; three campaign groups – Concern, Friends of Queen's Valley and Save our Valley – were supported by thousands of islanders opposing the flooding, with alternative suggestions such as capping the population at 80,000, installing water meters and desalination. TV presenter David Bellamy led a protest walk attended by 2,000 islanders. However, in 1986, in the tenth States debate on the matter, the States agreed to flood the valley in the face of possible water shortages, were new capacity not provided. The reservoir opened in November 1991 and has a capacity of 1,193 megalitres (enough to supply the whole island for 48 days). It is two reservoirs and there is a 1.9 miles (3.1 km) public footpath encircling both reservoirs, with natural flora and fauna.

== Twin towns ==
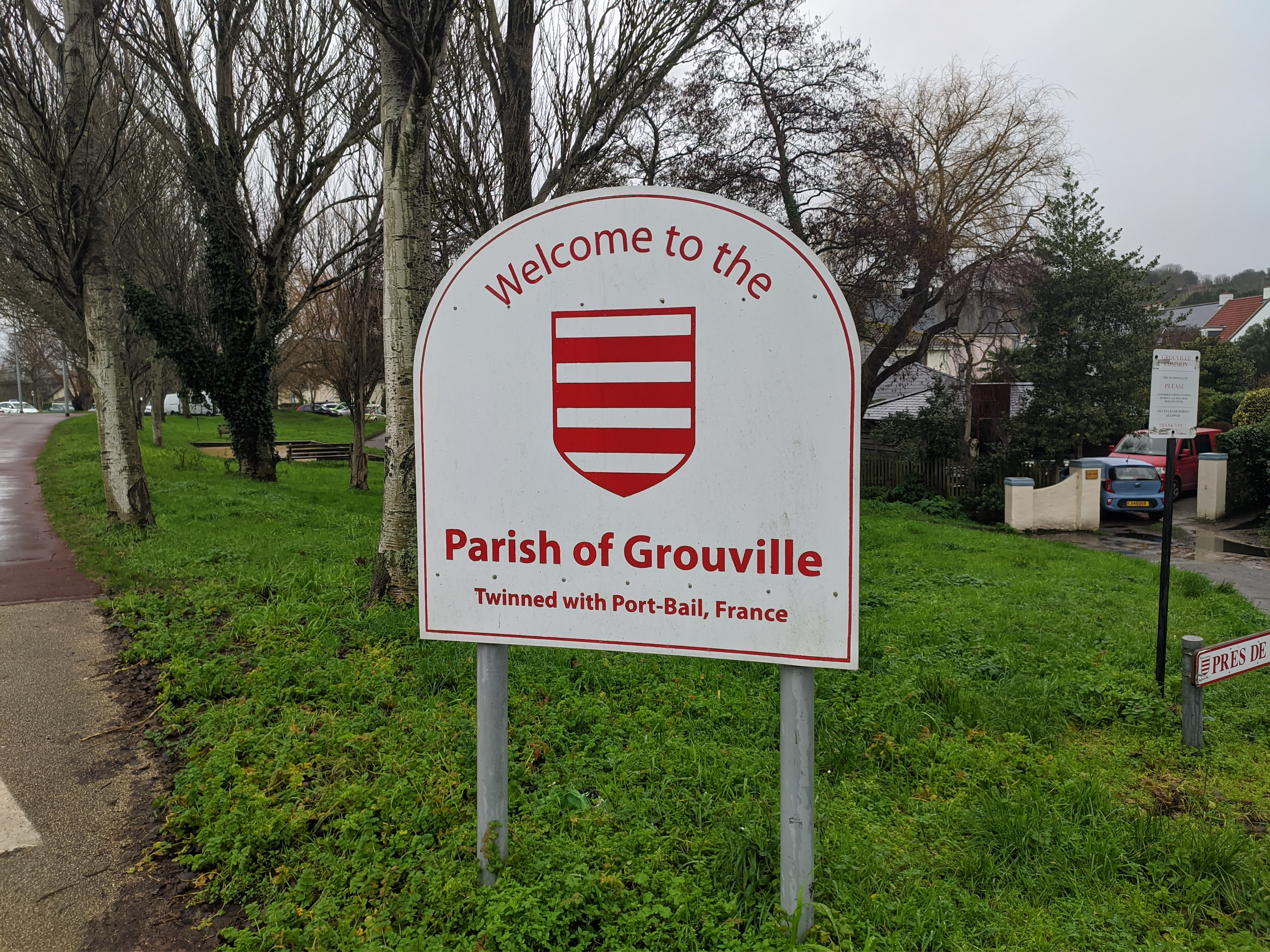
A sign welcoming people to Grouville in Gorey

Grouville is twinned with:

- (France) Port-Bail, Normandy

== Notable people ==
- John George Bourinot (elder) (1814–1884), politician
- Lucy Nettie Fletcher (1886–1918), nurse
- Ruby Ray (1881 – after 1973), stage actress
- Harry Vardon (1870–1937), golfer
- Callum Osmand (2005-present), footballer

== See also ==
Grouville Hoard
