= List of Constables for St Saviour =

Connétables or Constables act as the civic heads of the twelve parishes in Jersey. In each of the twelve parishes, the Constable is based in their local parish hall.

Despite some of the parishes in Jersey dating back to around 475AD, the exact origins of the Connétable remain unclear. It is believed that the role may have been created in the 13th century, however records on island only date back to the 15th century.

Since 1462, St Saviour, Jersey has been led by at least 56 different Constables.

== List of Connétables for St Saviour ==
Constables of St Saviour (1462–date)
| Portrait | Name | From | To | Note |
Connétables of St Saviour
| | Johan Poingdestre | 1462 | | First recorded Constable in Jersey. Served during the French Occupation of Jersey (1461-1468). Later served as the Lieutenant-Baliff, and Jurat of the Royal Court of Jersey. |
| | George Lempriere | 1464 | | Served as the second Constable of St Saviour during the French occupation of Jersey (1461-1468) |
| | Records missing or unrecorded following the appointment of Lempriere, up to 1531 | | | |
| | Clement Lempriere | 1531 | | Became a Jurat in 1524 |
| | Johan Nicolle | 1539 | | He was the Seigneur of Longueville, and later Attorney-General |
| | Thomas Poingdestre | 1546 | 1549 | An Advocate. Buried 11 May 1566 outside St Saviour Church |
| | Edouard Messervy | 1549 | 1552 | Became a Centenier in 1542, a Solicitor-General in 1562 and later Jurat. |
| | Thomas Lempriere | 1552 | | Probably from the area of Maufant |
| | Hostes Nicolle | 1558 | 1561 | Later served as the Baliff of Jersey between 1561 and 1564. |
| | Clement Messervy | 1561 | 1572 | |
| | Jean Poingdestre | 1572 | 1580 | |
| | Aaron Stocall | 1580 | 1586 | First of two non-consecutive terms |
| | Edouard Poingdestre | 1586 | 1587 | First of two non-consecutive terms |
| | Benjamin La Cloche | 1587 | 1591 | Seigneur of Longueville. Buried 12 July 1610. |
| | Aaron Stocall | 1592 | 1597 | Second term |
| | Edouard Poingdestre | 1597 | 1611 | Second term. Resigned in 1611. |
| | Benjamin La Cloche | 1611 | 1624 | Son of Constable Benjamin La Cloche (served 1587-1591). Seigneur of Longueville; famous local diarist. |
| | Jean Messervy | 1624 | 1629 | Son of Jurat Aaron Messervy. Studied at St John’s College, Oxford. Buried 1634. |
| | Aaron Stocall | 1629 | 1645 | Son of Constable Aaron Stocall (served 1580-1586, and 1592-1597). He was re-elected in 1645, but had to resign due to his poor health. |
| | Philippe Dumaresq | 1645 | 1650 | Served during Royalist control of Jersey during the English Civil War. Resigned in 1650. |
| | Etienne Anthoine | 1650 | 1651 | A centenier since 1645. Resigned in 1651 with the arrival of the Parlimentarians. |
| | Clement Gallie | 1652 | 1660 | Served during the Parliamentary/Commonwealth occupation |
| | Jean De Carteret | 1660 | 1668 | Elected around the Restoration of Charles II. Played an important role during the civil war in Jersey during the English Civil War. Died in 1668. |
| | George La Cloche | 1669 | 1676 | He was the Seigneur for Longueville. Became Jurat in 1676 |
| | Richard Dumaresq | 1676 | 1694 | Allowed to resign in 1694 |
| | Charles Poingdestre | 1694 | 1702 | Son of Lieutenant-Baliff Jean Poingdestre. He became Jurat in 1702 |
| | Benjamin La Cloche | 29 August 1702 | June 1703 | Younger son of George La Cloche. Died in June 1703 |
| | Amice La Cloche | 1703 | 1713 | He was the Advocate for the Royal Court, and was elected as Jurat in 1713 |
| | Nicolas Dumaresq | 1713 | 1725 | He became Jurat in 1725. |
| | Parish records conflicting following the appointment of Dumaresq, up to 1743 | | | |
| | Philippe Bandinel | 1743 | 1755 | Member of the influential local Bandinel family. Seigneur of Meleches.Gave the land on which the hospital was built. Died in office in 1755 |
| | Edouard Estur | 1755 | 1758 | |
| | Jean Poingdestre | 1758 | 1770 | First of three non-consecutive terms. Seigneur of Anneville |
| | Edouard Mourant | 1770 | 1773 | Centenier from 1755. Died in 1791. |
| | Thomas Le Hardy | 1773 | 1776 | First of two non-consecutive terms. Served as the Jurat between 1740-1775, and Lieutenant-Baliff |
| | Jean Poingdestre | 1776 | 1779 | Second term |
| | Thomas Le Hardy | 1779 | 1782 | Second term. Died in 1798 |
| | Jean Poingdestre | 1782 | 1785 | Third term |
| | Jean Dumaresq | September 1786 | 1801 | Beat Jean Poingdestre by 72 votes to 71 in 1785. Both sides accused each other of malpractice; however Poingdestre dropped his claim by 1786. Later became a political reformer and leader of the Magot Faction. Former Lieutenant-Baliff. |
| | Abraham Aubin | 1801 | 1807 | Served two consecutive terms, followed by one non-consecutive term. A former Centenier. Re-elected in 1804 |
| | Philippe Le Vavaseur dit Durell | 1807 | 1813 | |
| | Philippe Gaudin | 1814 | 1817 | Won the election of 1817 by 66 votes, but asked not to be sworn in. A new election was held. |
| | Abraham Aubin | 1817 | 1820 | Aubin won the new election by 74 votes, but initially refused to get sworn in. He later changed his mind and served his third term. He died in 1832, aged 78. |
| | Jean Pelgué | 1820 | 1829 | Received a complaint from his opponent Philippe De Heaume in the 1823 election, which was later withdrawn. Died in 1847, aged 79. |
| | Abraham Aubin | 1829 | | Son of Constable Abraham Aubin (served 1801 - 1809, and 1817-1820). Served two non consecutive terms. |
| | Philippe Arthur | 1839 | 1842 | Seigneur of Longueville |
| | François Godfray | 1842 | 1860 | A fiery advocate who dominated Jersey politics. Undisputed leader of the Rose Party. He was re-elected 5 times for this role, until he became a deputy in 1860. |
| | Abraham Aubin | January 1860 | February 1866 | Second term |
| | Thomas Anthoine | February 1866 | 1872 | |
| | William Philippe De Gruchy | 1872 | 1878 | |
| | John Vaudin | 1878 | 1883 | Became Jurat in 1883, and later Petty Debts Court judge in 1887 |
| | Henry Nicolle Godfray | 1883 | 1884 | Served as a Deputy for St Helier between 1881-1883. Later became States Treasurer in 1886, and Jurat in 1908 |
| | Stanley Edwin Malet | 1884 | 1886 | He became impots principal agent. |
| | Théodore Le Gallais | 1886 | 1892 | Later served as a Deputy, and was a major island legal figure. He became the Receiver-General in 1899. He died in 1903. |
| | James-John Eraut | 1892 | | |
| | John Arthur Perrée | 1908 | 1923 | Major figure in Jersey agriculture; RJAHS Secretary. |
| | Leslie Thomas Anthoine | 1923 | 1948 | Long standing civic leader. Despite still ‘officially’ being Parish head during WW2, he was detained as a British POW during the years 1940-1945 due to his rank as a major in the Royal Jersey militia. The parish was run de facto by the parish trustees and the centeniers. |
| | Thomas Philip Mourant | 1948 | May 1963 | Elected unopposed. Hosted Queen Elizabeth II and Prince Philip during the 1957 Royal Visit. |
| | George Le Breton | 1964 | 1976 | |
| | Leonard James Norman | 1976 | 1983 | “Len” Norman. Later became Minister for Home Affairs. |
| | Connie Green | 1983 | 2005 | First female Connétable for St Saviour.One of the longest serving in modern history |
| | Peter Hanning | 2005 | 2011 | |
| | Sadie Le Sueur-Renard | 2011 | 2022 | Deeply popular and patriotic figure. Tragically passed away in April 2022 |
| | Kevin Lewis | 2022 | 2026 | Former infrastructure minister. Lost his seat in the 2026 Jersey General Election. |
| | Dave Curtis | 2026 | Present | Elected in the 2026 Jersey General Election with a majority of 1295. |
