= List of cemeteries in Jersey =

The following list of Jersey cemeteries lists cemeteries in the island of Jersey. The cemeteries are grouped by parish, and the list includes churchyards with graves.

== St Brelade ==
- Les Quennevais Parish Cemetery, Les Quennevais
- Parish Church of St. Brelade's churchyard

== St Clement ==
- Parish Church of St Clement

== Grouville ==
- La Croix Cemetery
- Grouville Church

== St Helier ==
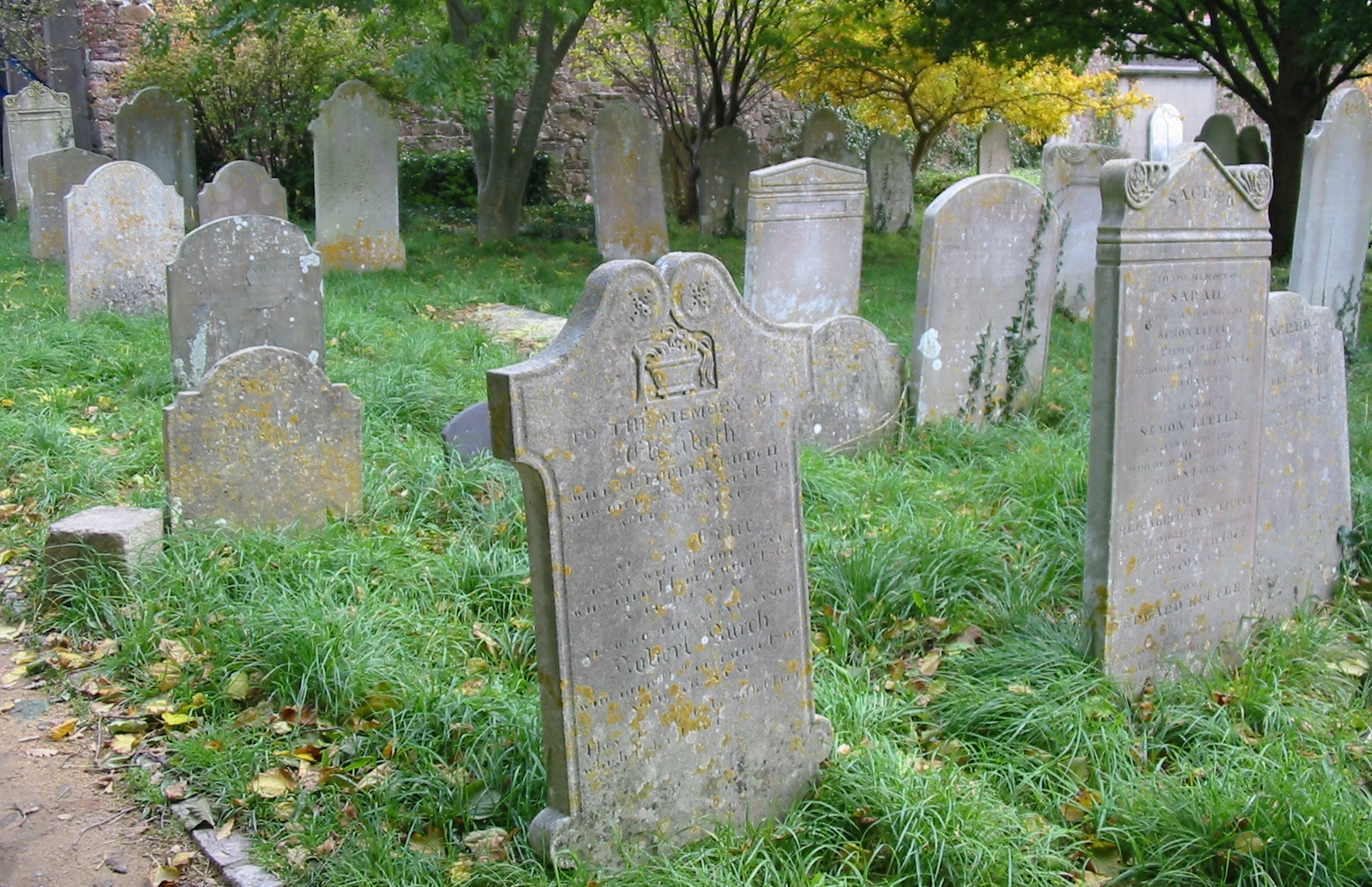
Green Street Cemetery

- Almorah Cemetery, St. Helier
- Green Street Cemetery, St. Helier
- Old Mont à l'Abbé Cemetery, St. Helier
- New Mont à l'Abbé Cemetery
- Parish Church of St Helier
- Jewish Cemetery, Westmount
- Surville Cemetery, Surville
- Westmount Cemetery, St. Helier

== St John ==
- Macpéla Cemetery, Sion in Vingtaine de Hérupe
- Parish Church of St. John churchyard, in the village of St. John

== St Lawrence ==
- St Lawrence Parish Churchyard

== St Martin ==
- Parish Church of St. Martin churchyard, in the village of St. Martin
- Our Lady of the Annunciation Catholic Churchyard, in the village of St. Martin

== St Mary ==
- Parish Church of St. Mary churchyard

== St Ouen ==
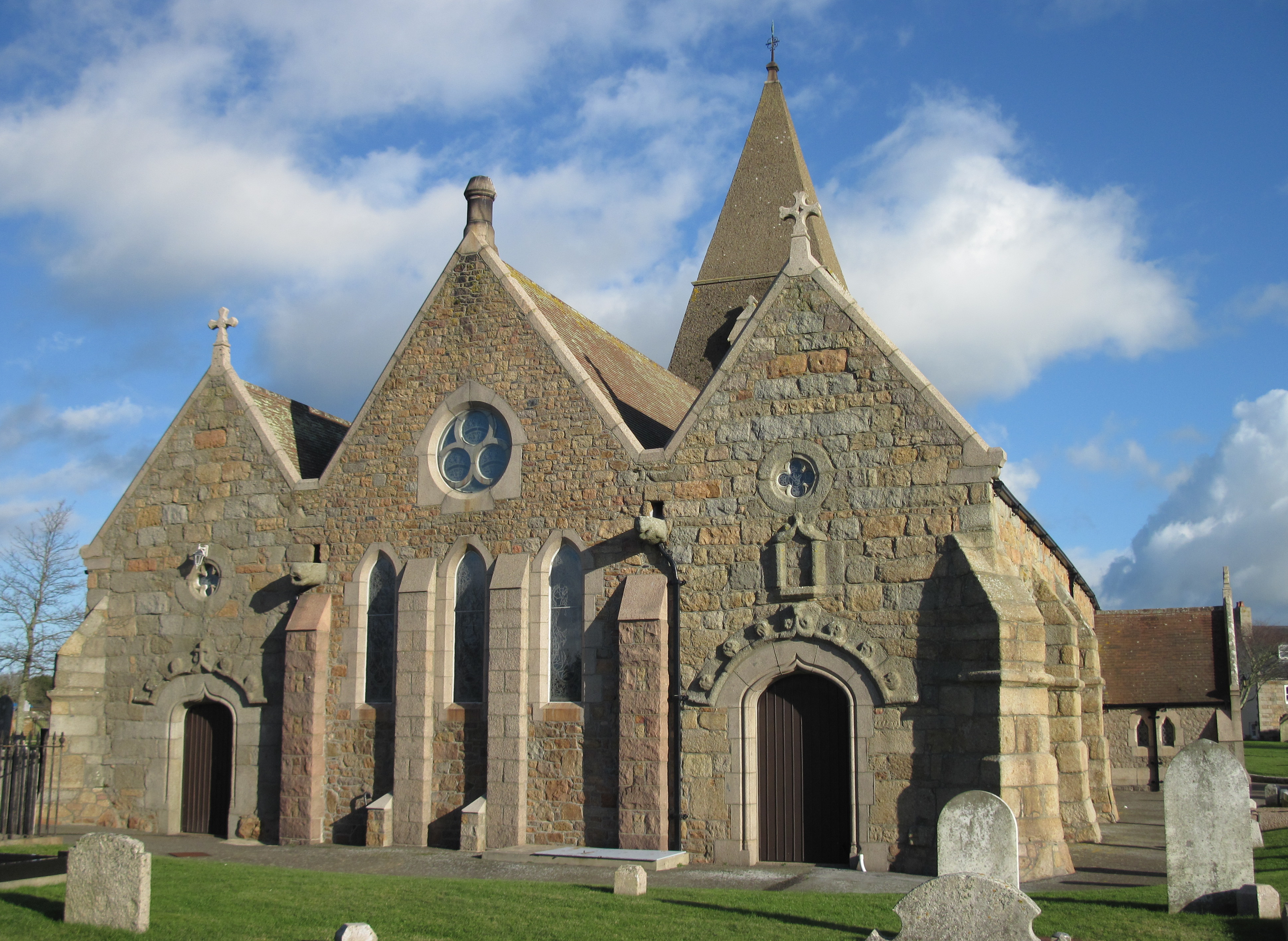
Parish Church of St Ouen

- Parish Church of St. Ouen
- St. Ouen Methodist Churchyard, in the village of Leoville

== St Peter ==
- Parish Church of St Peter churchyard, in the village of St. Peter
- Philadelphe Methodist Churchyard, in the village of St. Peter
- St. Matthew Roman Catholic Churchyard, west of Le Carrefour Selous

== St Saviour ==
- Parish Church of St Saviour
- Allied War Cemetery, Howard Davis Park, St. Helier

== Trinity ==
- Holy Trinity Parish Churchyard and Cemetery, in the village of Trinity
