= Vingtaine de la Rocque =

Vingtaine in Grouville, Jersey

Vingtaine de la Rocque La Rocque
- Vingtaine
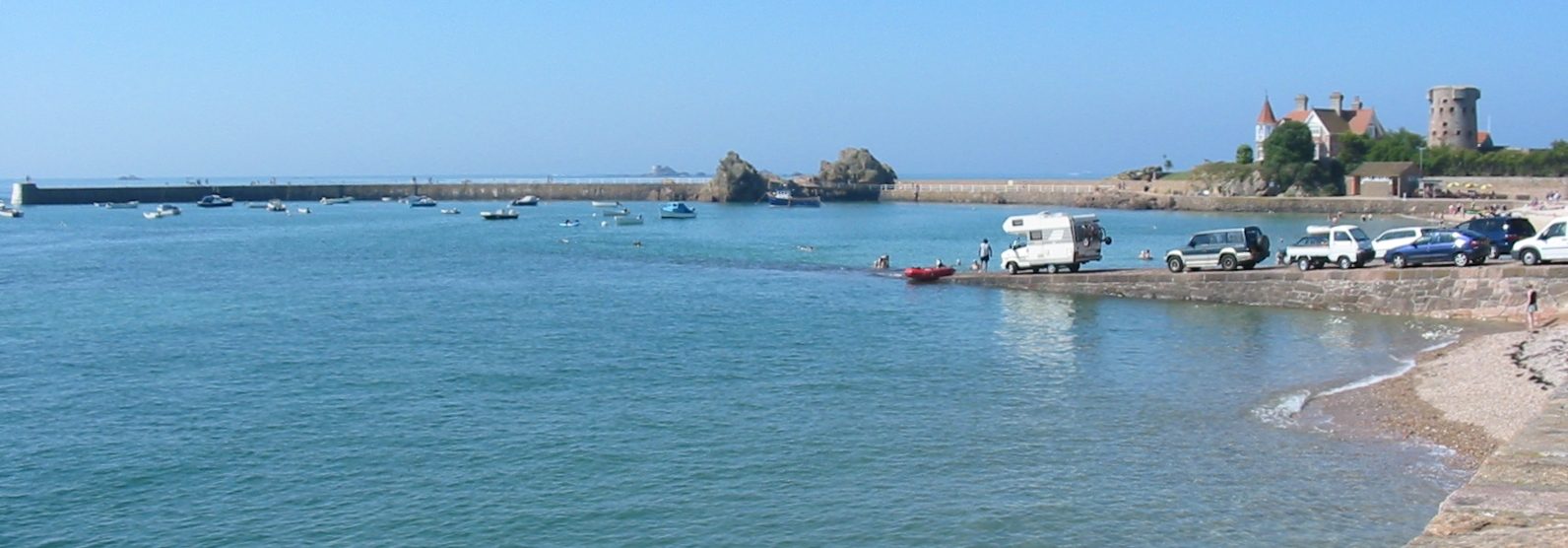
- The harbour of La Rocque formerly sustained a fishing community

- The vingtaine shown within the Channel Islands
- Coordinates: 49°9′56″N 2°1′56″W
- Crown Dependency: Jersey, Channel Islands
- Parish: Grouville

Vingtaine de la Rocque is one of the four vingtaines of Grouville Parish on the Channel Island of Jersey. It includes the uninhabited Minquiers.

== Transport ==
The Jersey Eastern Railway opened a station, at La Rocque, on 7 August 1873. The station was subsequently closed on 21 June 1929, and the station no longer exists.

== Harbour ==
La Rocque harbour lies within the vingtaine.

== Nature ==
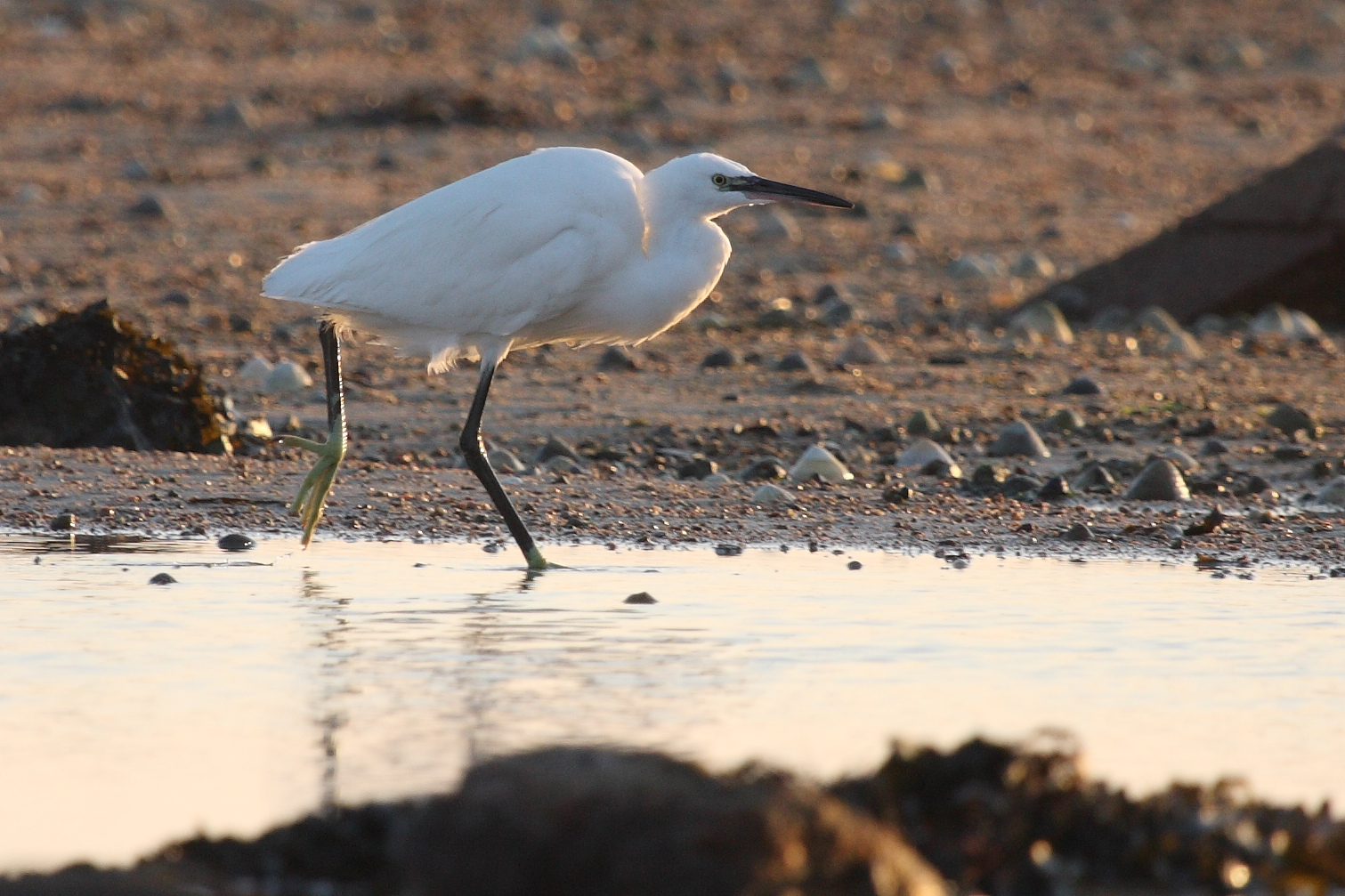
A little egret on the beach at La Rocque

Waders and seabirds make regular use of the exposed shoreline and nearby fields for feeding.

== See also ==
- St Peter la Rocque
