= List of reservoirs on Jersey =

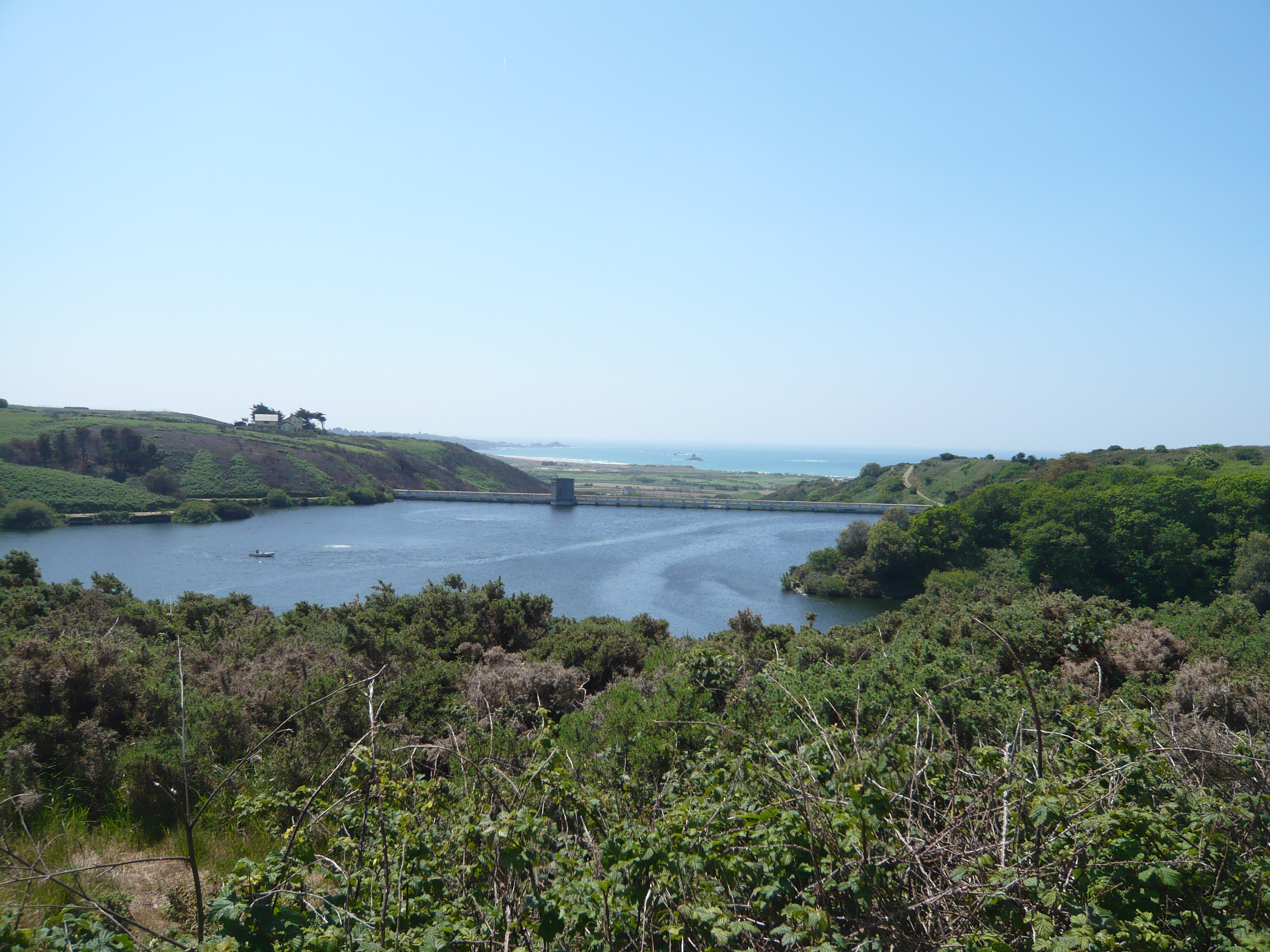
Val de la Mare Reservoir looking eastwards towards the sea

This is a list of reservoirs on Jersey. Jersey Water operate six main reservoirs, with an additional two reservoirs for untreated water that can be pumped between the other reservoirs. Raw water can be stored at Mont Gavey and Augres Treatment Works, with treated water being able to be stored at Augres, Handois, Les Platons, and Westmount. The two water treatment works on the island can process a maximum daily capacity of 46,000,000 litres (10,000,000 imp gal; 12,000,000 US gal) of water daily (28,000,000 litres (6,200,000 imp gal; 7,400,000 US gal) at Handois, and 18,000,000 litres (4,000,000 imp gal; 4,800,000 US gal) at Augres).

Security of water supply on the island has led to investigations into increasing the amount of water available; when at peak capacity, the combined amount of water in the six reservoirs would supply enough water for Jersey for 120 days. One option mooted is to expand Val de la Mare Reservoir, or use parts of the worked out Gigoulande Quarry as a seventh reservoir. A further option of a seventh reservoir is in the Mourier Valley on the north-western side of the island. The six main reservoirs listed fall under Reservoir (Jersey) Law 1996.

== Reservoirs ==
Name	Coordinates	Open	Water storage	Image	Notes	Ref
Dannemarche Reservoir	49.217°N 2.133°W	1909	93,000,000 litres (20,000,000 imp gal; 25,000,000 US gal)		The middle reservoir in the Waterworks Valley (the upper reservoir being Handois, and the lower one Millbrook). The term waterworks relates to when the stream through the valley powered several watermills before the age of steam.	
Grands Vaux Reservoir	49.204°N 2.087°W	1951	229,600,000 litres (50,500,000 imp gal; 60,700,000 US gal)		Located 2 kilometres (1.2 mi) north-east of St Helier, at a height of 36 metres (118 ft) above Ordnance Datum.	
Handois	49.232°N 2.131°W	1932	187,500,000 litres (41,200,000 imp gal; 49,500,000 US gal)		The largest reservoir on Jersey and the first of the chain of three down Waterworks Valley. The Handois water treatment works is located on the same site.	
Millbrook Reservoir	49.206°N 2.134°W	1896	36,400,000 litres (8,000,000 imp gal; 9,600,000 US gal)		First of the main reservoirs to be built on the island, at a cost of £6,767 (equivalent to £778,351 in 2025)	
Queens Valley Reservoir	49.196°N 2.044°W	1991	1,193,000,000 litres (262,000,000 imp gal; 315,000,000 US gal)		The dam wall is constructed from a rock-filled embankment with a bituminous concrete core. The reservoir was first proposed in 1975, and flooded Queens Valley. The only private dwelling to have the occupants forcibly evicted from, was also the building used as the home for the fictional detective Jim Bergerac.	
Val de la Mare Reservoir	49.217°N 2.205°W	1962	938,700,000 litres (206,500,000 imp gal; 248,000,000 US gal)		The dam wall reaches a height of 29 metres (95 ft)	

Some abstraction points are located on smaller reservoirs such as La Hague, and Le Maseline.
