= Grouville Church =

- Grouville Parish Church
- St Martin de Grouville
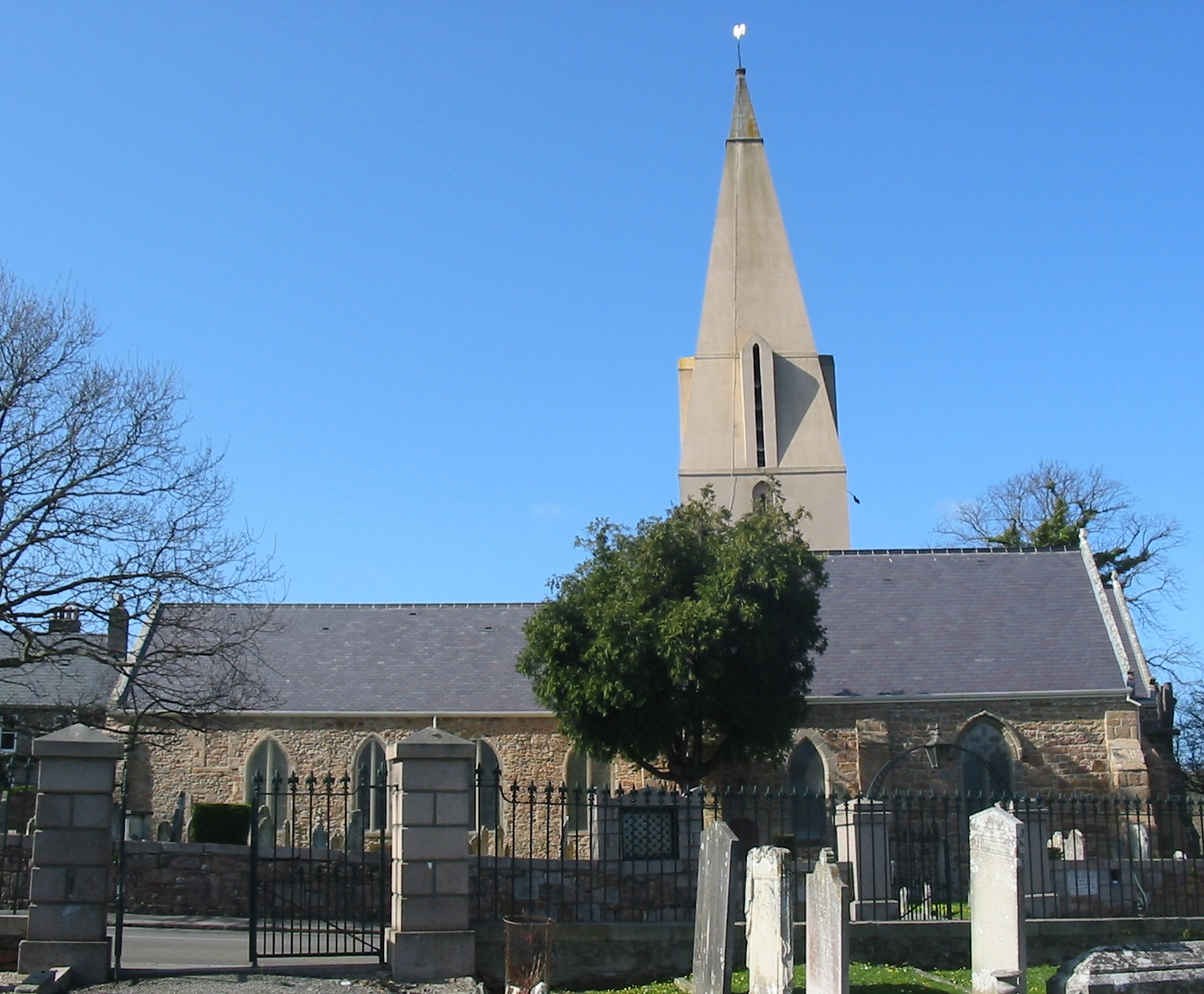
- Grouville Church
- 49.1838°N 2.0502°W
- Location: Grouville
- Address: La Rue à Don
- Country: Jersey
- Denomination: Anglicanism
- Previous denomination: Roman Catholicism

History
- Status: Parish church
- Dedication: Martin of Tours

Architecture
- Functional status: active
- Heritage designation: Jersey Listed Building – Grade I
- Designated: 30 July 2018
- Style: Gothic
- Years built: 12th–15th centuries

Administration
- Diocese: Anglican Diocese of Winchester

Clergy
- Rector: Helen Gunton

Grouville Church is one of the twelve ancient parish churches in the island of Jersey; it is sited in the eastern parish of Grouville. It is a Grade I Jersey listed building.

== Name ==
Grouville Church is dedicated to Saint Martin of Tours under the name "St Martin de Grouville", thus distinguishing it from St Martin's Church, where the dedication is to "St Martin le Vieux"; this indicates that Grouville was founded some time after the foundation of St Martin's.

== Bibliography ==
- The Cartulaire of Jersey
- The Bulletin of the Société Jersiaise
