= Fortifications of Guernsey =

The island of Guernsey has been fortified for several thousand years, the number of defence locations and complexity of the defence increasing with time, manpower and the improvements in weapons and tactics.

Being in the front line of many wars, invasion was almost always a threat and the best locations for defence were being constantly rebuilt with older constructions being re-used and improved.

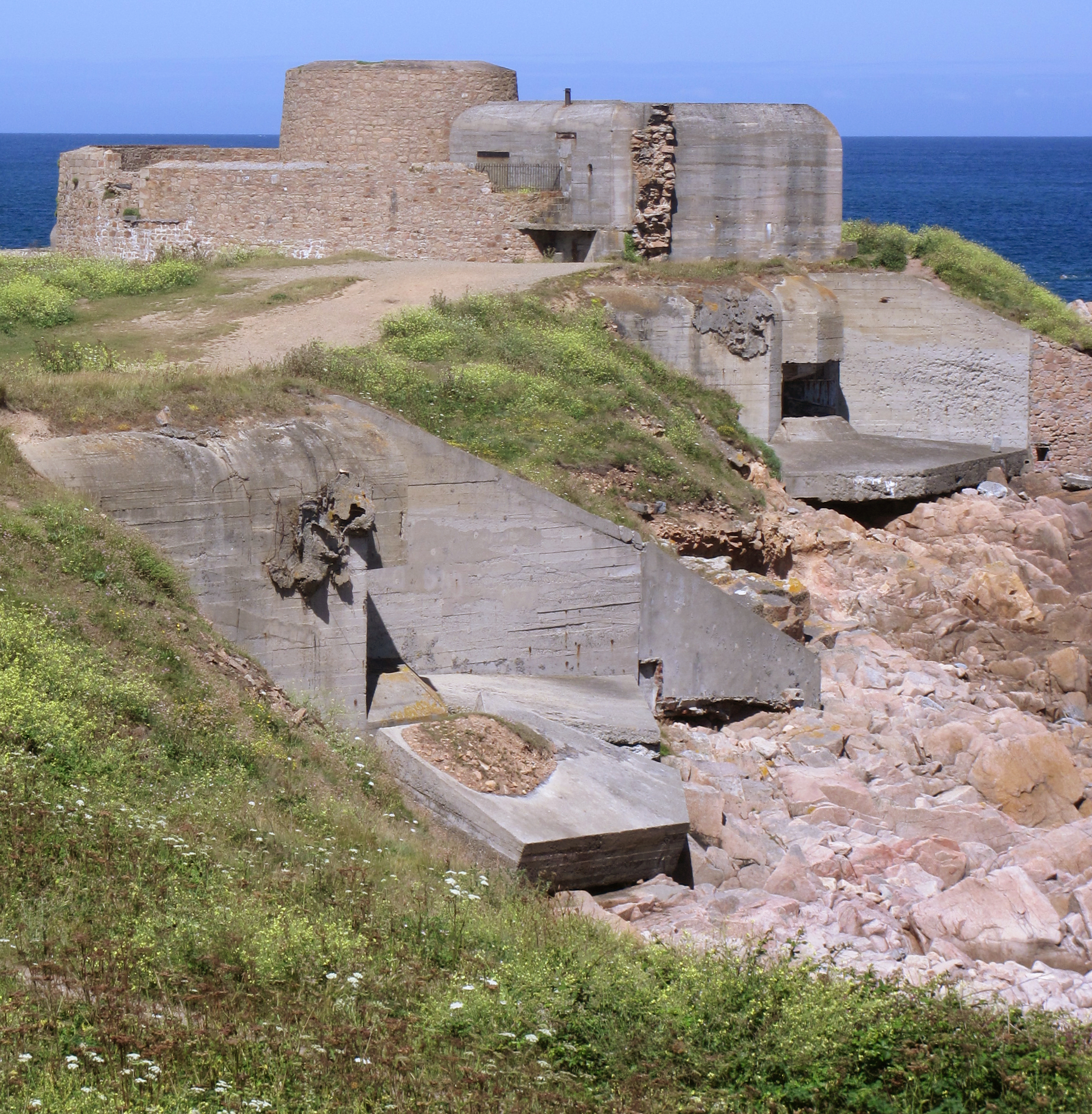
1804 Martello Tower re-used within 1943 Stützpunkt Rotenstein, Fort Hommet

== Early defences ==
The first form of defences comprised safe locations for the islanders to flee to in the event of an invasion. The headland at Jerbourg, the Castel fortress, the Chateau des Marais and the Vale Castle were probably the earliest.

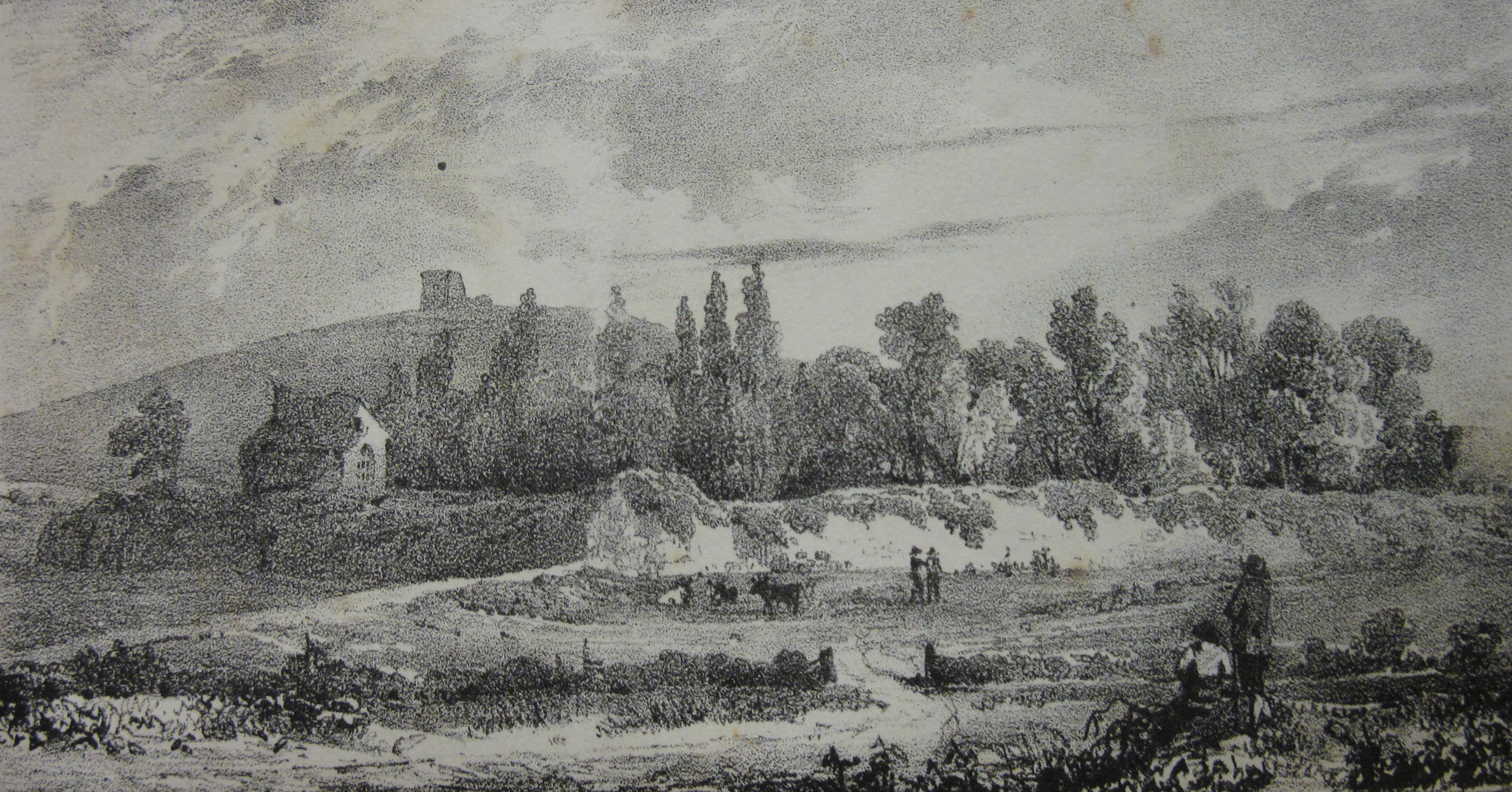
Ivy Castle in 1826

- The Jerbourg Point defences resembled an Iron Age fort, it comprises a series of ditches and banks across the neck of the headland, providing a short defensive wall behind which the people could retreat in times of danger. Dating from 2,000 B.C. the Jerbourg defence of three ditches was improved, firstly with stone reinforcing and later with wooden platforms, palisades and a tower, however it fell to French invaders in 1338.
- Nothing remains of the Castel fortress, apart from the parish name "Castel", or castle. It is suspected to date from Roman or Viking times and is thought to be located under the parish church.
- Chateau des Marais, also called locally "Ivy Castle" built in a swamp, a "marais", using the natural wetland, supplemented with banks and ditches for defence built in the 12th century. as a standard Motte and Bailey fort.
- The castle of Saint Michael or as it is now called "Vale Castle", dating from the Iron Age, was constructed to protect the population against pirates by providing a safe refuge. It is not possible to identify when the medieval works were started, possibly in the late 10th-century.

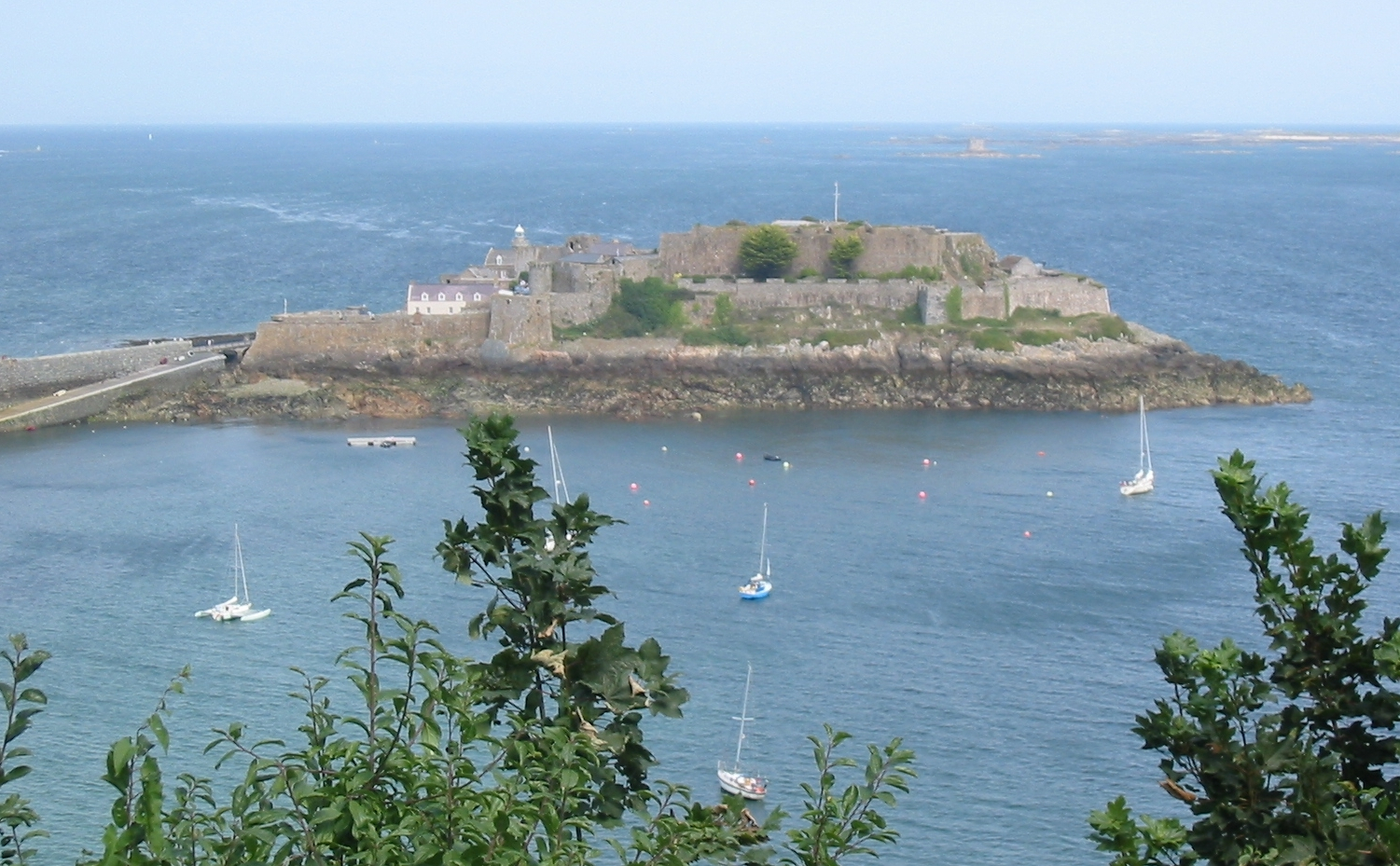
Castle Cornet

Castle Cornet was started in the late 13th Century on an islet accessible at low tide, outside Saint Peter Port. It would serve as the main base for the Governor of Guernsey, the commander of the Island's military forces, for many centuries.

The Guernsey militia was formed in 1337 and would continue until disbanded in 1946. It was compulsory for all men to belong to the militia. They trained weekly and for six centuries provided the main defensive force for the island.

A French invasion in 1338 captured the whole island including Castle Cornet, which dates back to at least 1256. Two years later the island was recaptured by English forces after the French navy was crippled at the Battle of Sluys and in August 1345 Castle Cornet was also recaptured. 13 years later the castle was again captured by the French before being evicted the following year.

In 1350 the King Edward ordered walls to be constructed around the town. The order was repeated when the work was not undertaken, but no evidence has been found of their existence. They would have linked the Tour Gand to the north with the Beauregard tower in the south.

In May 1372 Owain Lawgoch a claimant to the Welsh throne, at the head of a free company, on behalf of France, attacked Guernsey, popularly called "La Descente des Aragousais". Owain Lawgoch withdrew after killing 400 of the Island militia, The poem of the same name refers to the Vale Castle as the Château de l'Archange, the location of the last ditch stand against the insurgents.

With the advent of cannon and gunpowder, defences, now based mainly around Castle Cornet were remodelled between 1545 and 1548.

During the Third English Civil War, Castle Cornet, the main fortification in the island, supported the King whilst the island supported Parliament, this resulted in a siege of the castle that lasted nine years, ending in 1651. The castle had been improved over the centuries with added walls, gates and batteries.

The King's Survey of the Channel Islands was commissioned by Charles II in 1679. The report produced by Colonel Legge a year later was a comprehensive account of the state of defence, harbours and civil jurisdiction of the Islands. In Guernsey, defences had been poorly maintained, Castle cornet having suffered a major explosion after a lightning strike in 1672.

Main early defences, starting from St Peter Port and moving in a clockwise direction.

Parish	Place/Name	Notes	Coordinates
St Peter Port	Castle Cornet ‡ £	Main defence, built on islet and constructed of granite	49°27′10.8″N 2°32′15.7″W
St Peter Port	Town Walls	possibly built around 1350	49°27′14.3″N 2°32′10″W
St Peter Port	Gand tower	existed in the Pollet area, La Tourgand	49°27′28″N 2°32′7″W
St Peter Port	Beauregard tower	built in 1357 on Mignot Plateau, now demolished	49°27′12.4″N 2°32′14.4″W
St Martin	Jerbourg headland ʘ	earthen ditches and banks to protect headland	49°25′37.2″N 2°31′58.8″W
Forest	La Corbière Headland	A clifftop fortification that had fallen into disrepair by 1680	49°25′09.0″N 2°36′46.9″W
Torteval	Pezeries ‡ ʘ	Fort first mentioned in 1680	49°26′13.5″N 2°40′16.8″W
Castel	Hommet headland – Fort Hommet ʘ	fortification recorded in 1680 with one gun	49°28′27.8″N 2°36′44.1″W
Castel	Inland fortress pre 600 A.D.	possible earth and wood construction now demolished	49°27′30.7″N 2°34′23.2″W
Vale	Le Marchant headland – Fort L’Angle ‡ ʘ	small fort mentioned in 1680, renamed in 1805 Le Marchant	49°30′32″N 2°31′7.2″W
Vale	Vale Castle ‡ ʘ	built on top of a rock outcrop, protected by 15C granite walls	49°29′6.5″N 2°30′32.9″W
St Sampson	Chateau des Marais ‡ ʘ	built in a swamp, a standard Motte and Bailey fort	49°28′18.9″N 2°32′19.5″W

Key ‡ Protected Monument £ Accessible with fee ʘ Accessible

== 18th and early 19th Century ==
=== 18th Century threats from France ===
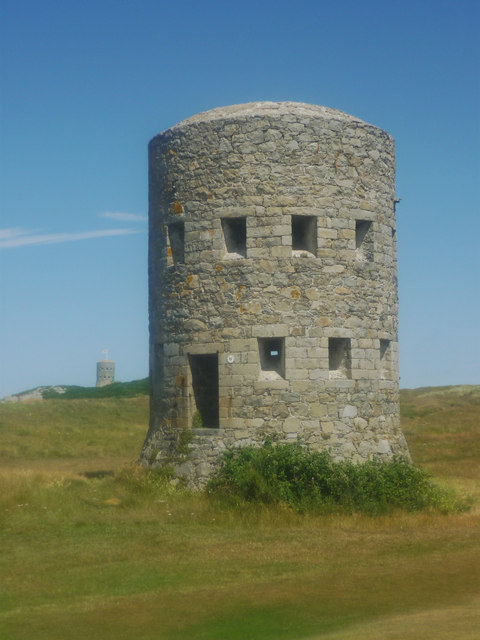
L'Ancresse Loophole Tower no. 6

Having lived with constant threats during the Seven Years' War (1754–63), threats of an invasion from France during the Anglo-French War (1778–83) resulted in additional artillery being brought to the Island and the construction of several forts, numerous batteries covering possible landing sites and fifteen Guernsey loophole towers built between 1778 and 1779, The threat was real as an invasion of nearby Jersey resulted in the Battle of Jersey in Saint Helier in January 1781. Work started in 1782 on the massive Fort George, on the hill south of Town, it would take over three decades to complete. Guernsey granite was used for the majority of the gun platforms, forts and walls with embrasures often lined with brick.

A map was produced in 1787 for the Duke of Richmond as Master-General of the Ordnance to show all existing roads and military positions.

=== French Revolution and Napoleonic era defences ===
The French Revolution in 1789 added to the concerns in the Channel Islands and resulted in additional constructions and an increase in manpower.

The island militia of around 3,000 men provided both infantry and coastal artillery units. They were supplemented with regular British infantry battalions who rotated and were increased or reduced depending on the current threat to the island. Before the barracks were built in Fort George, islanders were required to provide accommodation for soldiers that could not be accommodated in Castle Cornet. Each Parish had its quota and if they were quartered in public houses or private dwellings, the parish authorities were liable for the cost. Non British units, which were not allowed on the UK mainland, were sometimes based in Guernsey, including from 1793 to 1796 French Royalists and in 1799, 6,000 Russian troops, who were quartered at Delancey. In 1796 Peter de Havilland, a Jurat was appointed superintendent of thirteen signal masts around the island, installed to give warning of approaching ships.

Lieutenant-General John Doyle was appointed Lieutenant Governor of Guernsey in 1803. After declaring a "state of emergency" in 1804, he undertook many works to improve the defence of the Island, including the draining of the Braye du Valle, improving some roads to military standard and building forts and batteries around the coast, including completing Fort George. Major-General Sir John Doyle was supported from 1810 by the new Bailiff, Peter de Havilland. The "emergency" lasted until 1815.

Doyle was instrumental in getting three Martello towers built in 1804–1805, as well as the reclaiming of Braye du Valle 1806–1808, the improved military roads with mile markers, for which he argued eloquently, against much opposition, and barracks which together gave the militia and regular units improved facilities to repel any invasion.

The Royal Navy provided the first line of defence, Captain Sausmarez, in command of a Guernsey-based squadron consisting of three frigates, HMS Crescent (1784), HMS Druid (1783) and HMS Eurydice (1781), a lugger, and cutter frustrated a planned invasion by 20,000 French soldiers of the Channel Islands scheduled for February 1794, due to his vigilant eye Admiral James Saumarez was again put in charge of a squadron based in Guernsey from 1803 to 1808.

=== Defences ===
Land based defences, starting from St Peter Port and moving in a clockwise direction.

Parish	Place/Name	Notes	Coordinates
St Peter Port	Castle Cornet ‡ £	harbour defence, now a museum	49°27′10.8″N 2°31′33.6″W
St Peter Port	Havelet – Half Moon battery ʘ	battery covering Havelet bay	49°27′0.7″N 2°32′5″W
St Peter Port	Fort George	large fortress with barracks, built between 1782 and 1814, now a housing estate	49°26′38.4″N 2°21′16.8″W
St Peter Port	Fort George – Clarence battery ‡ ʘ	on headland, named Clarence Battery in honour of George III's son	49°26′46″N 2°31′48.8″W
St Peter Port	Fort George – Adolphus battery		49°26′33.4″N 2°32′2.8″W
St Peter Port	Fort George – Kent battery		
St Peter Port	Fermain Bay – Becquet battery ‡	¤63+64+65 Linked with magazine and watch house	
St Peter Port	Fermain Bay – North battery ‡	¤62	49°26′10.5″N 2°32′9.4″W
St Martin	Fermain Bay – Tower 15 Guernsey loophole towers ‡ ʘ	Plans to convert to holiday accommodation	49°26′9.7″N 2°32′1.3″W
St Martin	Fermain Bay – South battery	¤60	
St Martin	Bec du Nez battery and magazine ‡ ʘ	¤59 One gun	49°25′47″N 2°31′53.8″W
St Martin	Jerbourg battery ‡	¤57+58 built over by later German defences	49°25′27.1″N 2°31′53.5″W
St Martin	Jerbourg – La Moye battery ‡	¤56 La Tas de Pois d'Ament battery	49°25′13.8″N 2°32′20.4″W
St Martin	Moulin Huet – Left and Right batteries ‡ ʘ	¤54+55	49°25′27.1″N 2°34′55.7″W
St Martin	Saints Bay – Tower 14 ‡		49°25′24.8″N 2°33′31.6″W
St Martin	Saints Bay – Left and Right batteries	¤52+53 With two 24-pounder guns	49°25′15.8″N 2°33′26.3″W
St Martin	Icart Point – battery	¤51 destroyed	49°25′11.6″N 2°33′51.8″W
St Martin	Petit Bôt – Tower 13 ‡ ʘ		49°25′33.2″N 2°34′54.8″W
Forest	Petit Bôt – St Claire battery and magazine ‡ ʘ	¤50 Two 24-pounder guns and magazine	49°25′27.2″N 2°34′56.4″W
Forest	Moye watch house		49°25′19″N 2°35′12.4″W
St Peter	Prevote watch house ‡	¤48 Built over with German tower, granite stones and steps have been reused	49°25′14.3″N 2°37′8.8″W
Torteval	Les Tielles – Battery and watch house ‡	¤47 Three gun emplacements	49°25′29.6″N 2°38′21.6″W
St Peter	Mont Herault watch house ‡	¤46 manned by militia overnight	49°25′31.2″N 2°39′21.6″W
Torteval	Pleinmont watch house ‡ ʘ	¤45 mentioned in Victor Hugo's book 'The Toilers of the Sea' house destroyed by German troops	49°25′38.8″N 2°40′5.5″W
Torteval	Narron or Narrow Point Battery ‡ ʘ	¤44 One 9-pounder gun position, suffering erosion from the sea	49°26′4.2″N 2°40′27.1″W
Torteval	Pleinmont or Petit Portes Battery ‡ ʘ	¤43 Granite battery for one 18-pounder gun	49°26′7.8″N 2°40′25.3″W
Torteval	Pezeries fort and battery ‡ ʘ	¤42 Three gun battery and magazine in star fort	49°26′13.5″N 2°40′16.8″W
St Peter	Château de Rocquaine – Fort Grey ‡ £	Martello tower built 1804 now a museum	49°26′21″N 2°39′18.2″W
St Peter	Rocquaine Bay – Brock battery	¤41 Built over by Germans in WW2	49°26′38.6″N 2°38′58.2″W
St Peter	L’Eree Point – Battery ‡ ʘ	¤40 Two guns on granite battery site, magazine	49°27′21.1″N 2°39′31.4″W
St Peter	L’Eree Point – Fort Saumarez ‡	Martello tower now used as foundation for German observation tower	49°27′27.2″N 2°39′21.5″W
St Saviour	Le Catioroc – Mont Chinchon battery, magazine ‡ ʘ and watch house	¤38+39 Two gun battery with magazine and ¤39 watch house behind on hill	49°27′37.6″N 2°38′33.4″W
St Saviour	Perelle – battery ‡ ʘ	¤37 Two gun battery, magazine	49°27′35.1″N 2°38′3.4″W
St Saviour	Perelle – Fort Richmond ‡	Fort and barracks, now a private house	49°27′50.5″N 2°37′48.2″W
Castel	Vazon – Mouillin or Left battery and magazine ‡	¤34 Destroyed by German WW2 defences, magazine intact	49°27′47.3″N 2°37′14.4″W
Castel	Vazon – Tower 12 and Right battery ‡ ʘ	¤31 Magazine	49°28′7″N 2°36′23.4″W
Castel	Hougue battery ‡ ʘ	two 24-pounder guns (originally 3)	49°28′1.4″N 2°35′53.4″W
Castel	Hommet headland – Fort Hommet ʘ	¤30 Martello tower built 1804 with batteries for six guns	49°28′27.8″N 2°36′44.1″W
Castel	Albecq – Burton battery ‡ ʘ	¤29 Two gun battery with alternate positions and magazine	49°28′29.3″N 2°35′59.2″W
Castel	Le Guet –Rocque de Guet watch house ‡ ʘ	¤28 Built in 1780	49°29′15″N 2°35′39.4″W
Castel	Cobo – South battery and magazine ‡	¤26+27 Battery destroyed when road built, but magazine remains intact ʘ	49°28′31.3″N 2°35′36.4″W
Castel	Grandes Rocque – fort and battery ‡ ʘ	¤23 Battery held three 24-pounder guns and magazine	49°29′17.7″N 2°35′19.7″W
Vale	Portinfer – battery ‡ ʘ	¤22 One 20-pounder gun position	49°29′22.3″N 2°34′41.3″W
Vale	Rousse – Tower 11 and battery ‡ ʘ	¤21 Museum	49°29′52.6″N 2°33′14.5″W
Vale	Chouet – Tower 10 ‡ ʘ		49°30′16.2″N 2°32′49.2″W
Vale	La Lochande Battery ‡		49°30′18″N 2°32′53.5″W
Vale	Pembroke – Pembroke fort ‡ ʘ and Platon battery	¤18 One 20-pounder gun	49°30′27.4″N 2°31′55.4″W
Vale	Pembroke – star fort ‡	built 1811, some evidence of earthworks	49°30′20.5″N 2°32′1.8″W
Vale	Pembroke – Tower 9 ‡ ʘ		49°30′22.1″N 2°32′4.1″W
Vale	L'Ancresse – Tower 8	demolished	
Vale	L’Ancresse – Half Moon and centre batteries	¤15+16 demolished	
Vale	L’Ancresse – Tower 7 ‡ ʘ		49°30′7.9″N 2°31′51.4″W
Vale	L’Ancresse – Tower 6 ‡ ʘ		49°30′4.6″N 2°31′35.9″W
Vale	L’Ancresse – Tower 5 ‡ ʘ		49°30′9.7″N 2°31′20.4″W
Vale	L’Ancresse – Nid de L’Herbe battery ‡ ʘ	¤14 Three gun battery with magazine	49°30′11.9″N 2°31′21.8″W
Vale	Le Marchant headland – Fort le Marchant ‡ ʘ	¤13 small fort expanded in 1805	49°30′32″N 2°31′7.2″W
Vale	Le Marchant headland – Tower 4 ‡ ʘ		49°30′23″N 2°31′4.5″W
Vale	Fort Doyle ‡ ʘ	Small fort and battery built 1805	49°30′21.6″N 2°30′19.3″W
Vale	Beaucette battery	¤12 Two 18-pounders upgraded to 20-pounder guns, magazine demolished by quarrying	
Vale	Bordeaux old battery	demolished by quarrying	
Vale	Vale Castle ‡ ʘ	Old walled fort on small hill	49°29′6.5″N 2°30′32.9″W
St Sampson	Mont Crevelt – Tower 3 and battery ‡	¤9 small fort with tower and battery protecting harbour	49°28′49.9″N 2°30′48.6″W
St Sampson	Belle Greve Bay – Spur point, and Kempt batteries	Spur point on private land, Kemp has been destroyed	49°28′34″N 2°31′13.8″W
St Sampson	Belle Greve Bay – Tower No 2	demolished in 1958	49°28′21.6″N 2°31′58″W
St Sampson	Belle Greve Bay – Belle Greve battery	¤5 demolished	
St Sampson	Chateau des Marais ‡ ʘ	magazine built inside castle	49°28′18.9″N 2°32′19.5″W
St Sampson	Hougue-a-la-Pere – Tower No 1 and battery ‡	¤4 tower demolished in 1905, battery intact	49°28′11.1″N 2°32′3″W
St Peter Port	Salerie battery ʘ	¤1 now a car park	49°27′46″N 2°31′55.4″W

Key ‡ Protected Monument £ Accessible with fee ʘ Accessible ¤1850 list and battery number

== Post Napoleonic ==
In 1819 a Picquet House was constructed near the Town Church, its purpose being to provide a harbour side military presence and a lockup for unruly persons.

=== Victorian era ===
In 1850 a letter was presented to Queen Victoria listing the defences on the island. During the Victorian era, defence improvements mainly consisted of replacing the Napoleonic cannon with breach loading heavier artillery in the 1870s and modifying forts to take a smaller number of the larger calibre guns. Many of the older batteries were decommissioned. A number of new military buildings were also built.

The militia received updated breach loading rifles in 1870. Drab khaki service dress was issued in 1902 when the militia size was reduced to 1,000 men during times of peace.

Some defensive positions were improved with a small glacis, whilst making the gun positions less obvious to an attacker.

Building works in the Victorian period starting from St Peter Port and moving in a clockwise direction.

Parish	Place/Name	Notes	Coordinates
St Peter Port	Castle Cornet ‡ £	improved artillery	49°27′10.8″N 2°32′15.7″W
St Peter Port	Arsenal	store for mobile artillery built in 1850 and the Militia headquarters, now the Island fire station	49°27′31.1″N 2°32′35.3″W
St Peter Port	Clarence battery ‡ ʘ	improved artillery	49°26′46″N 2°31′48.8″W
Castel	Fort Hommet ʘ	improved artillery and barracks built 1856	49°28′27.8″N 2°36′44.1″W
Vale	L’Ancresse Bay – Pembroke Fort ‡ ʘ	improved artillery	49°30′27.4″N 2°31′55.4″W
Vale	Fort Le Marchant ‡ ʘ	improved artillery and barracks built 1854	49°30′32″N 2°31′7.2″W
Vale	Fort Doyle ‡ ʘ	upgrade for improved artillery	49°30′21.6″N 2°30′19.3″W
St Peter Port	Bréhon Tower ‡	sea fort built by 1856	49°28′16.5″N 2°29′17.3″W
Various	Four militia arsenals built in 1882	Le Bordage (Baubigny), St. George (les Beaucamps), Les Naftiaux and St. Peter-in-the-Wood (Les Islets)	

Key ‡ Protected Monument £ Accessible with fee ʘ Accessible

=== World War I ===
First World War defences saw just one innovation, the establishment of a French seaplane base, on the pier close to Castle Cornet, in St Peter Port. The pilots flew on constant watch for German submarines.

The rules regarding the militia were changed to suspend the force, the volunteering men were partly scattered amongst British units, the main force was converted into the Royal Guernsey Light Infantry. The island's men went off to war, most to fight in France.

War trophies of four German 13.5 cm K 09 artillery guns were displayed next to Victoria Tower until two were scrapped in 1938 and in 1940 the remaining two were buried in case enemy aircraft suspected they were "live". Forgotten about, they were uncovered in 1978 and are again on display.

=== World War II ===
The island was demilitarised in June 1940 including suspending the militia again. During the German occupation which ran from June 1940 to May 1945 a massive building programme was instigated by Germany which saw the construction of tunnels, anti-tank sea walls, coastal casemates, artillery positions, artillery observation towers, radar units and a mass of trenches, minefields and barbed wire entanglements.

Up to 7,000 Organisation Todt workers in Guernsey built mainly in two years, between 1941 and 1943, the bulk of the fortifications. The German Festung Guernsey book recorded 616,000m³ of concrete used in Guernsey, almost 10% of the concrete used in the Atlantic Wall.

Of the eleven artillery batteries on Guernsey, the largest was located in Batterie Mirus, comprising four 30.5 cm guns which had a range of 51 kilometres (32 mi).

Camouflage was used in defensive works by German engineers, as were burying or part burying structures to escape aerial observation and attack. Many guns were designed to fire at an angle across a potential danger area rather than facing the sea, where they would be susceptible to direct fire from ships. The thickness of the concrete walls and roofs of the German structures providing adequate protection for weapons developed by 1944.

Many constructions are on private land and not accessible to the public, others may be looked at, clambered over and a few can be entered with care. Those that can be visited include:

Parish	Place/Name	Notes	Coordinates
St Peter Port	Castle Cornet ‡ £	Hafenschloss ("Harbour Castle") now a museum	49°27′10.8″N 2°32′15.7″W
St Peter Port	St Jacques ‡ £	Naval Signals HQ, now a museum	49°27′39.8″N 2°32′46.7″W
St Peter Port	La Vallette tunnels £	Tunnels used to store fuel, now a museum	49°26′53.7″N 2°31′52.9″W
St Andrew	"Ho.7/40" tunnels £	Large tunnel complex, now the underground hospital museum	49°26′31.8″N 2°34′35.2″W
Forest	German Occupation Museum £	Main island museum relating to the occupation period	49°25′46″N 2°35′35.4″W
Torteval	"Battery Dollmann" ʘ	Restored German 22 cm battery	49°25′37.6″N 2°40′3.9″W
Torteval	"Observation Tower MP3" £	Artillery observation tower now a museum	49°25′57.3″N 2°40′17.2″W
St Peter	L’Eree headland trenches ʘ	re-excavated trench system	49°27′27.3″N 2°39′22.8″W
Castel	Fort Hommet 10.5cm Casement ‡ £	Renovated beach defence area now a museum	49°28′24.2″N 2°36′33.7″W
Vale	L’Ancresse ʘ	Assorted bunkers on the common and nearby anti tank wall	49°30′13″N 2°31′7.7″W
Vale	Vale Castle ‡ ʘ	German modifications to older castle	49°29′6.5″N 2°30′32.9″W

Key ‡ Protected Monument £ Accessible with fee ʘ Accessible

=== Cold War ===
Castle Cornet provided an underground control bunker, using the WW2 German concrete construction, which would, in the event of war, control shipping in the western end of the English Channel.

== Gallery ==
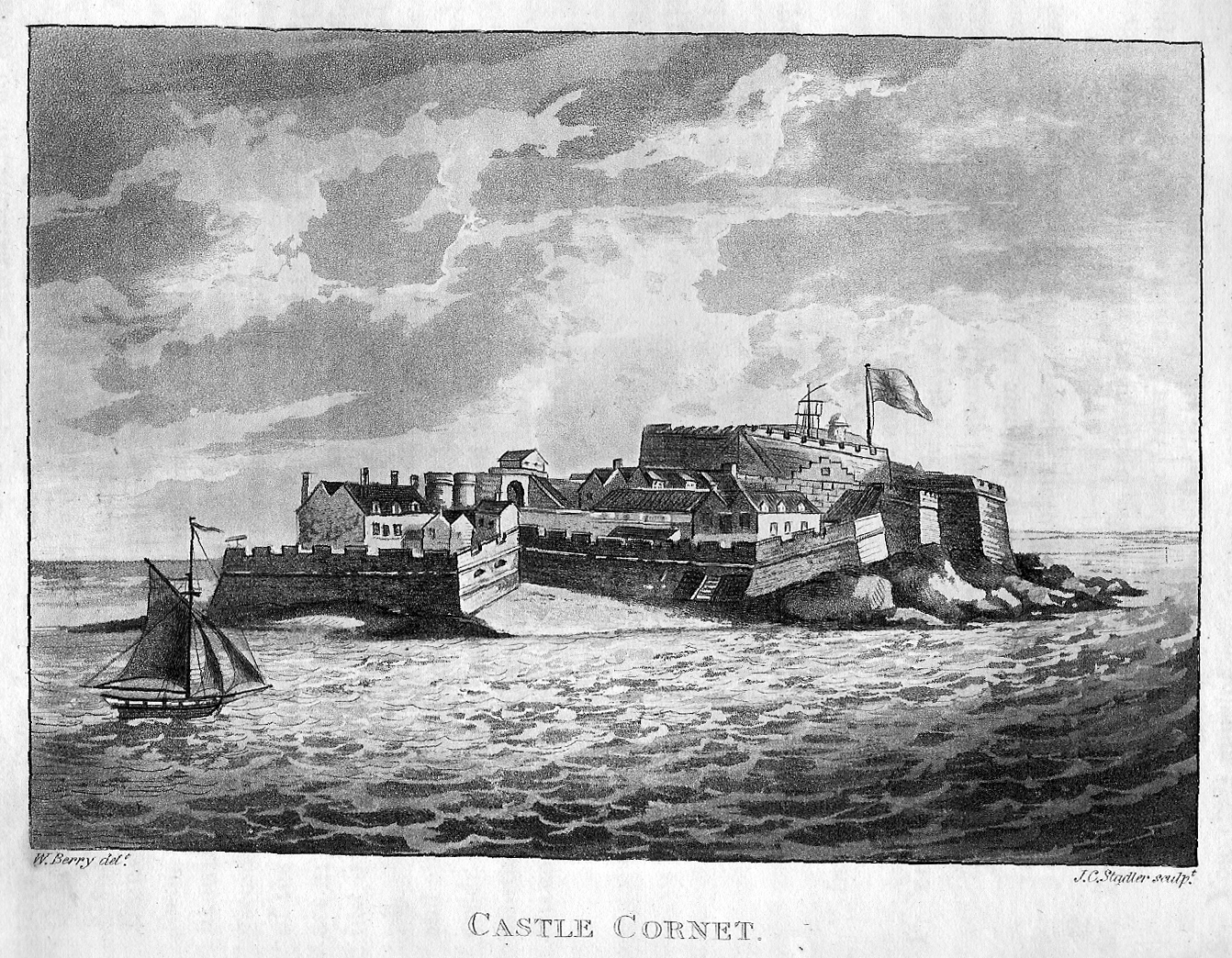
An old print of Castle Cornet c. 1814.

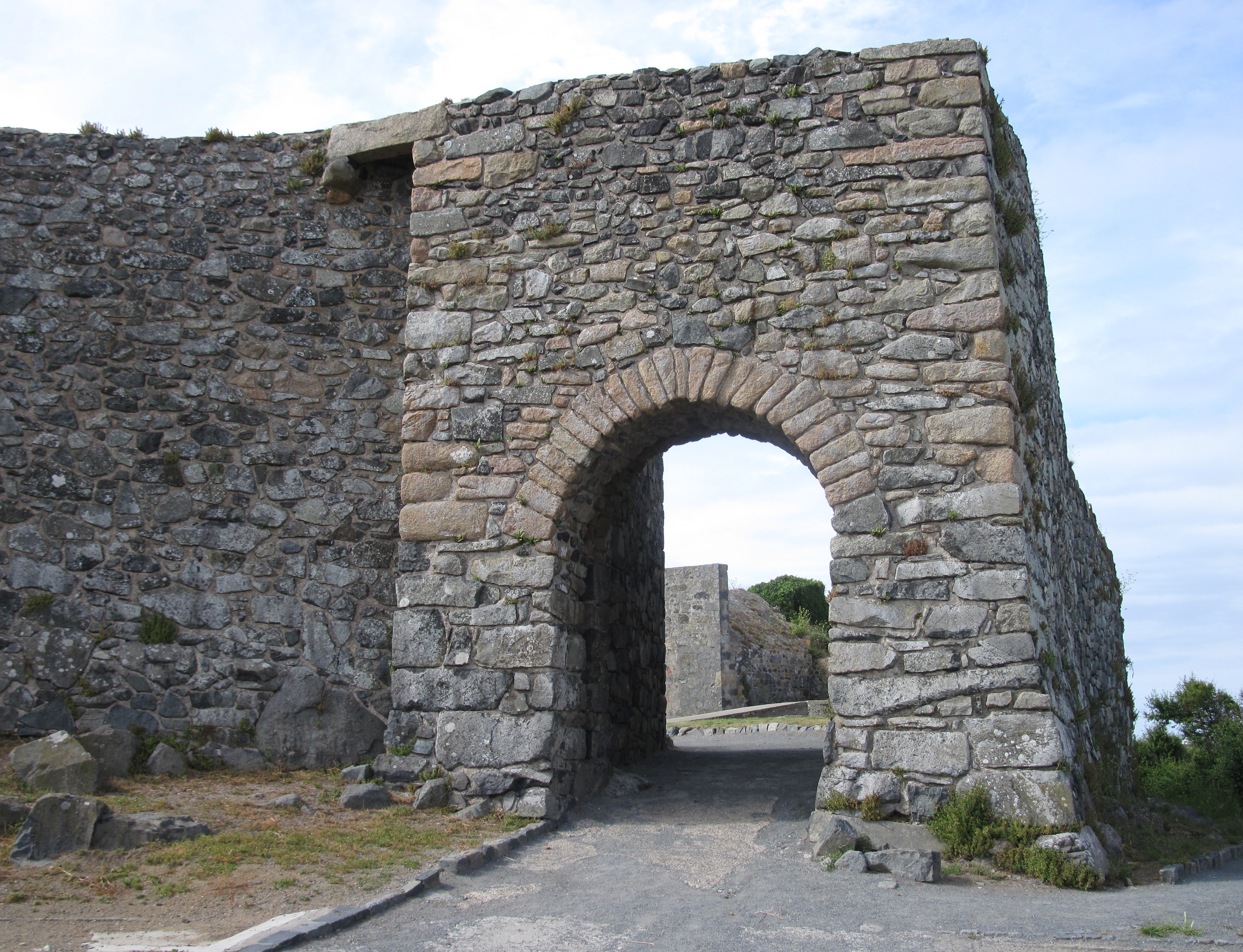
Vale Castle entrance

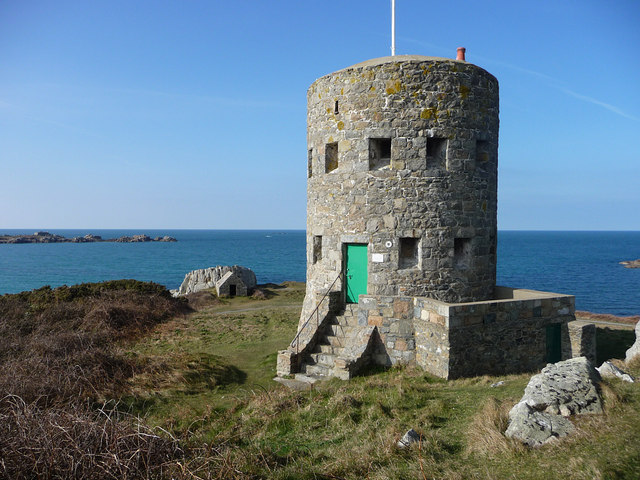
Tower No 5

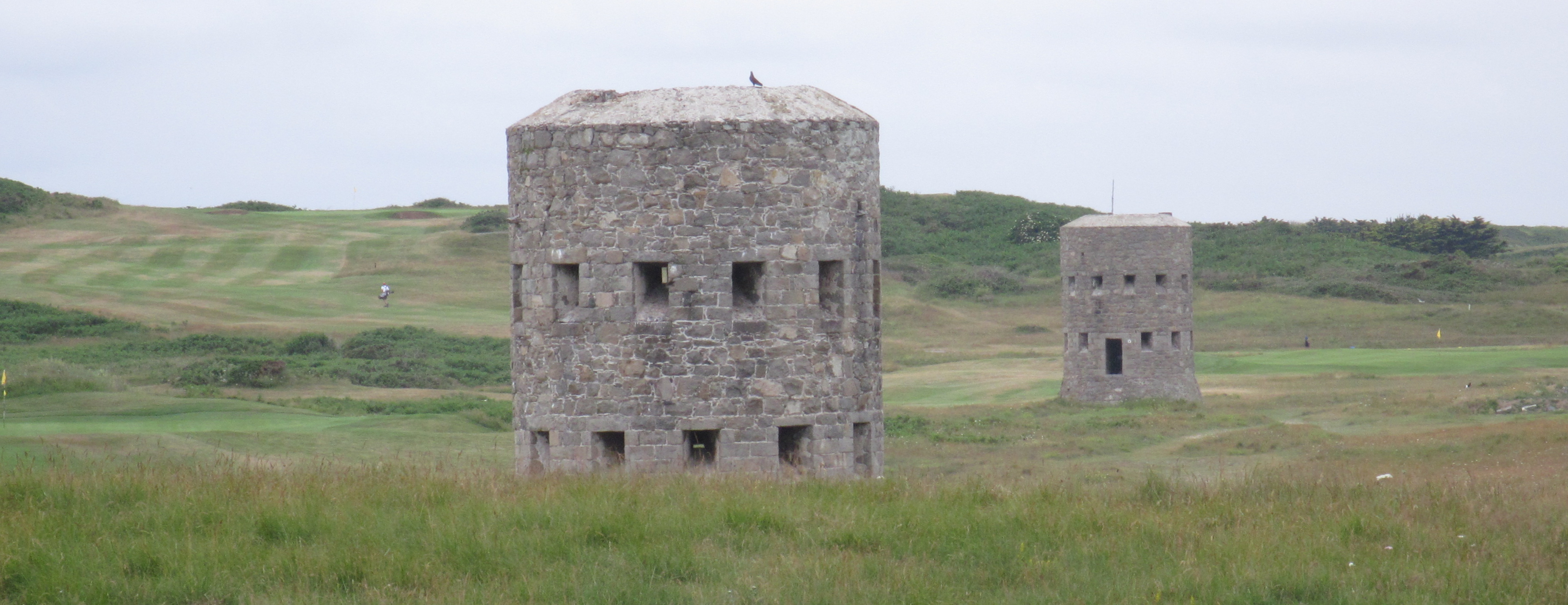
Towers on L'Ancresse

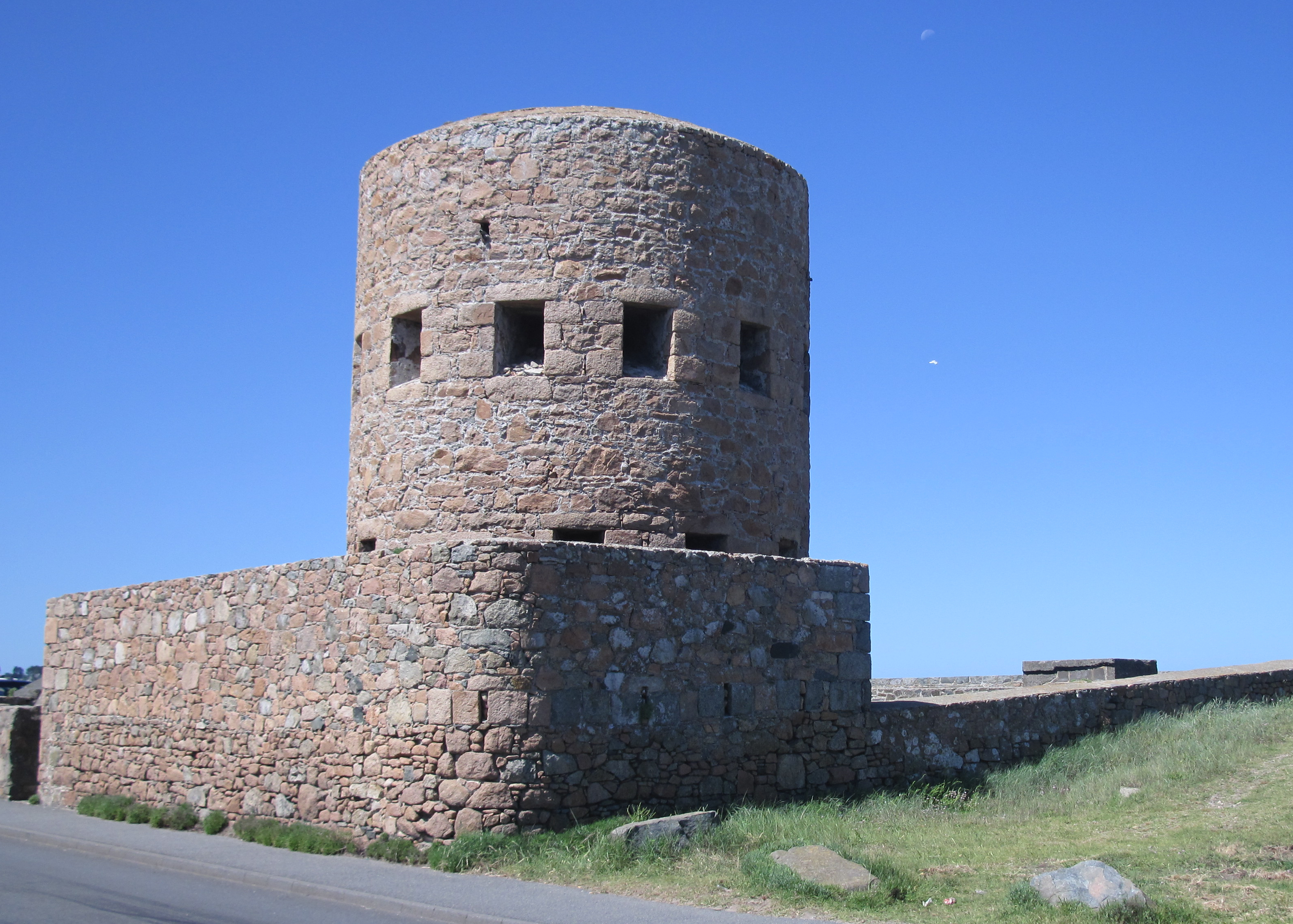
Tower 12 at Vazon

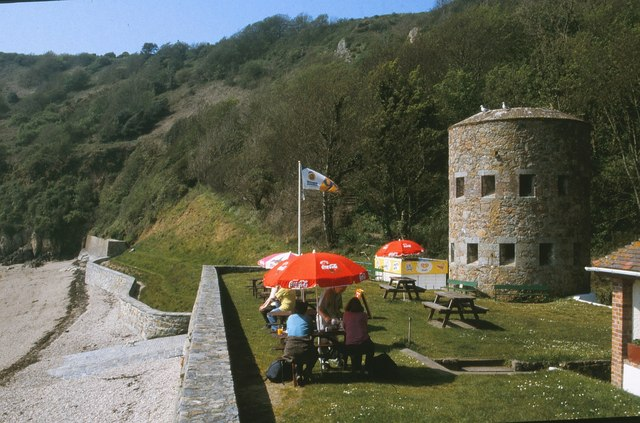
Tower 15 at Fermain Bay

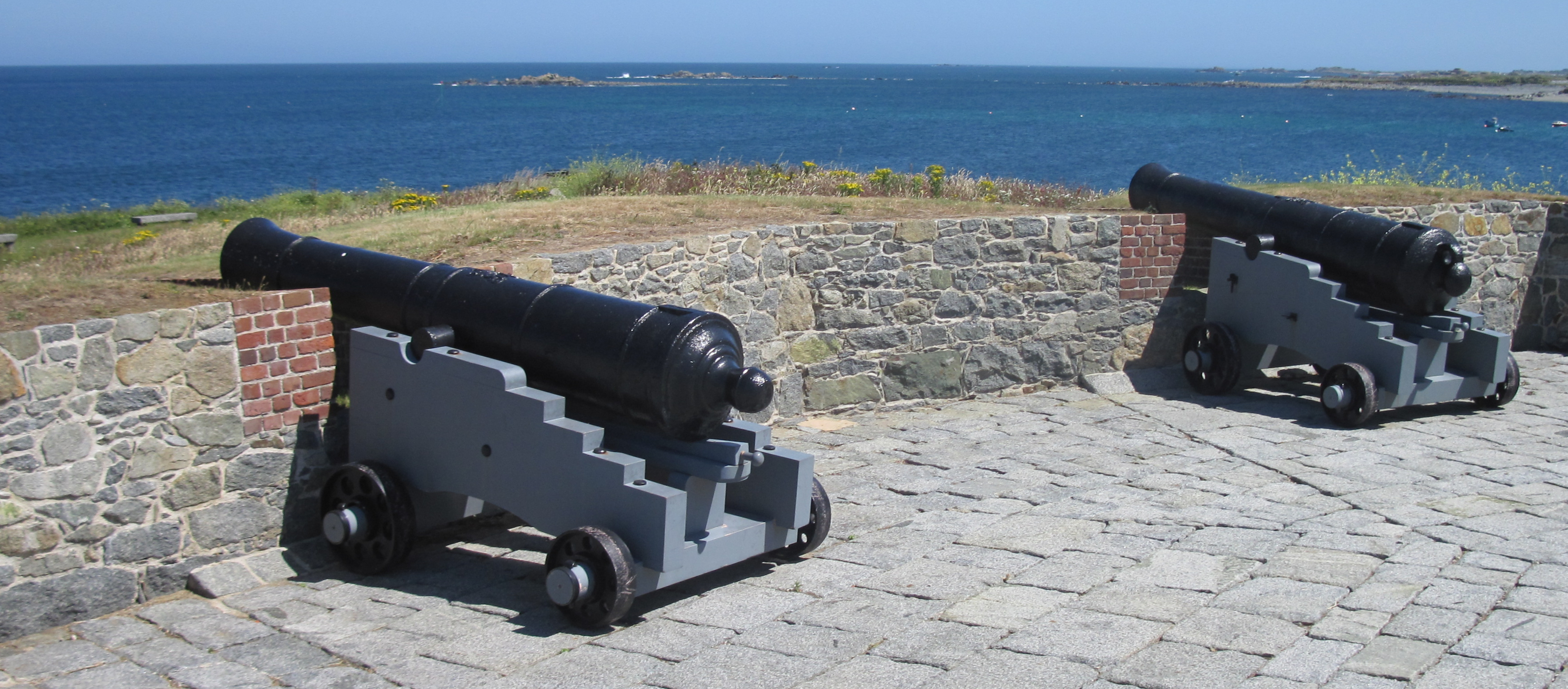
Mont Chinchon battery

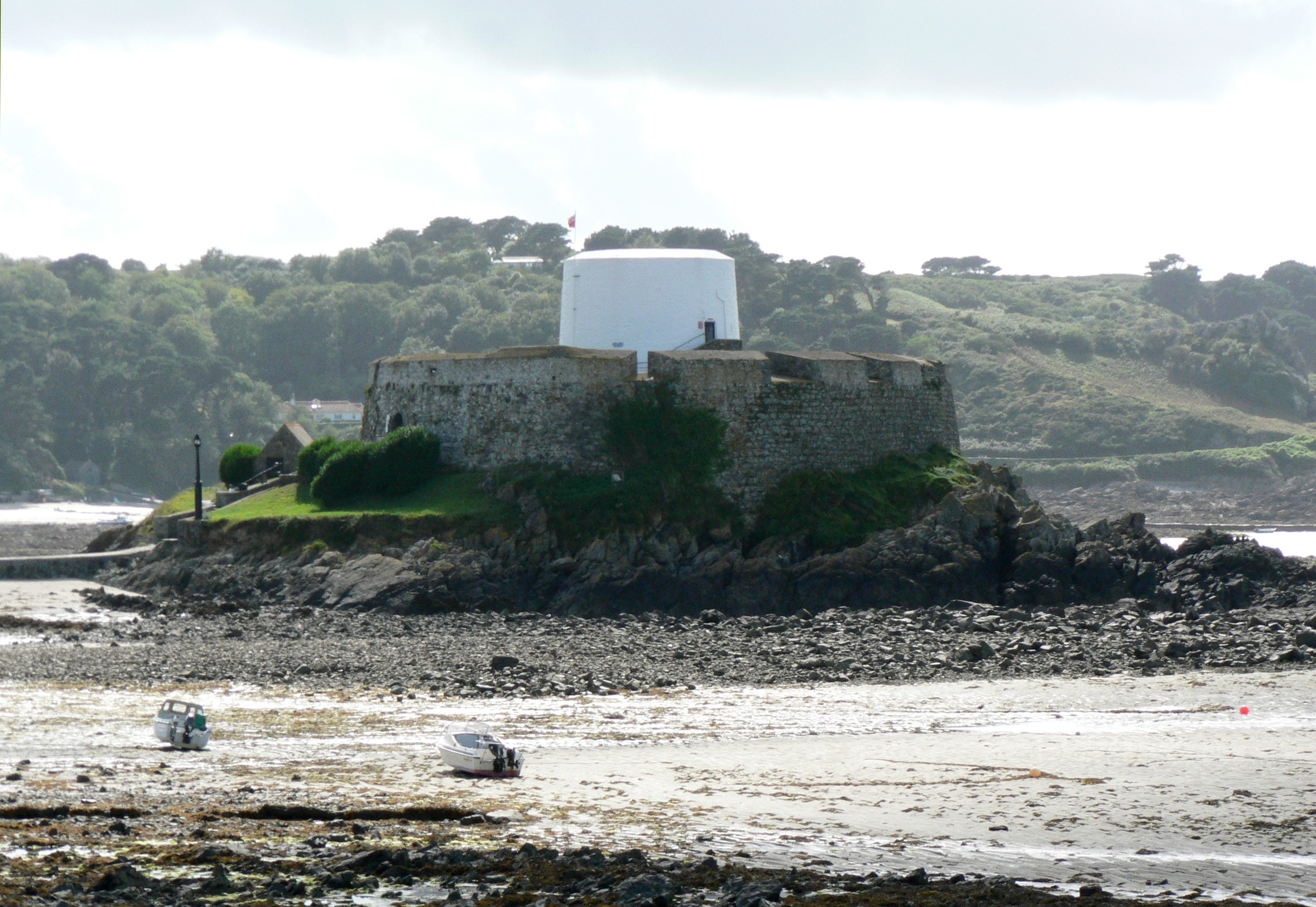
Fort Grey

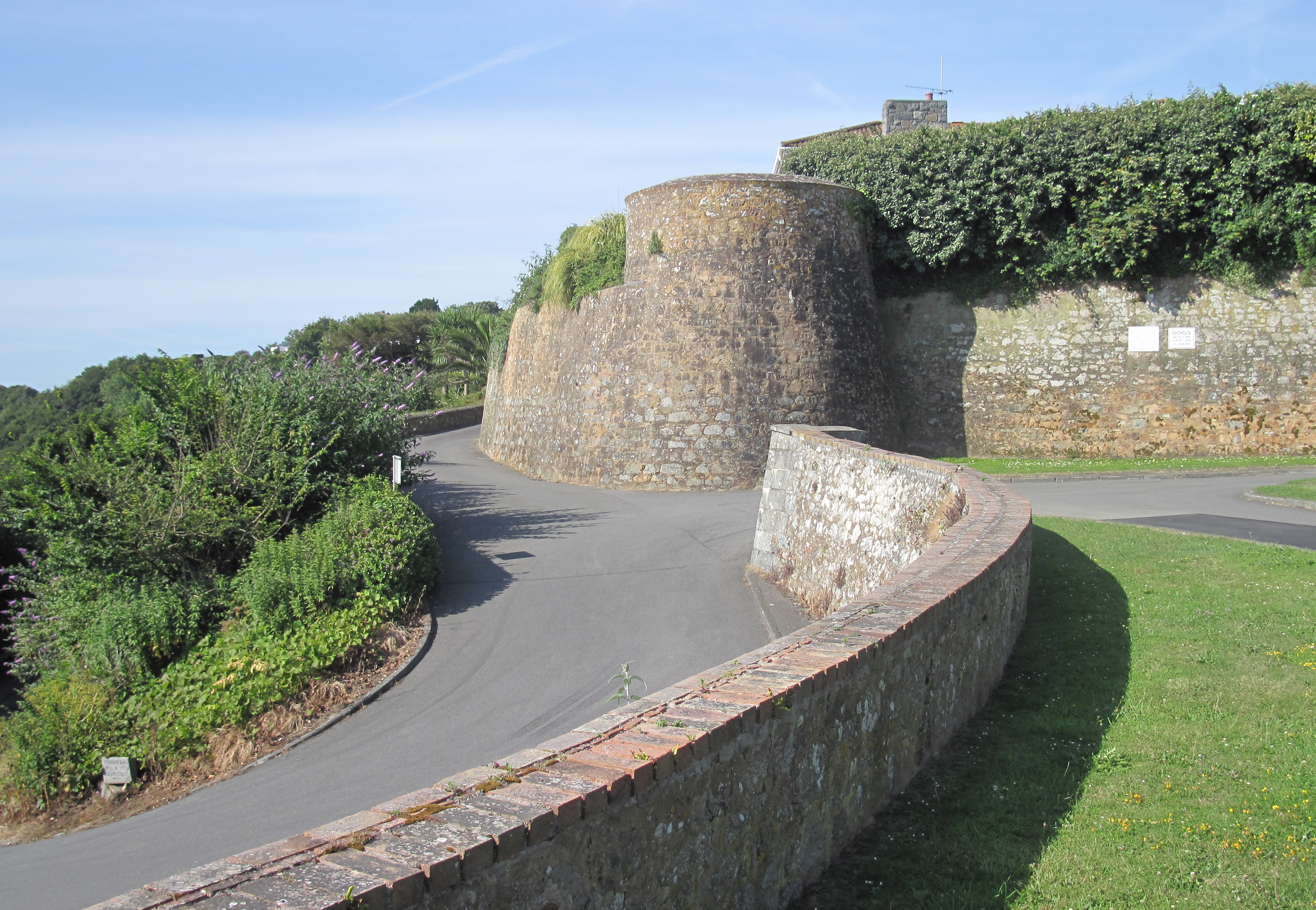
Fort George (1)

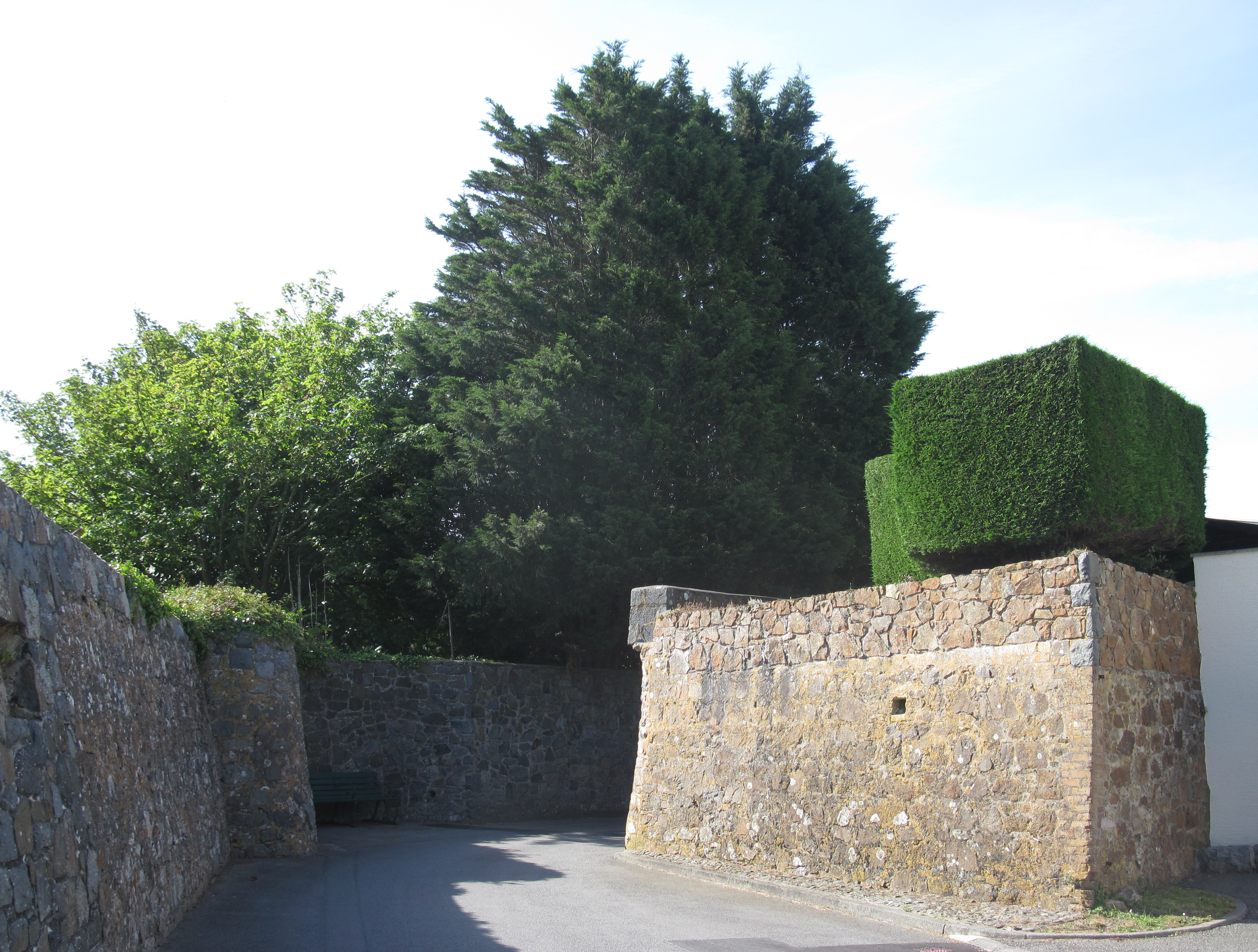
Fort George (2)

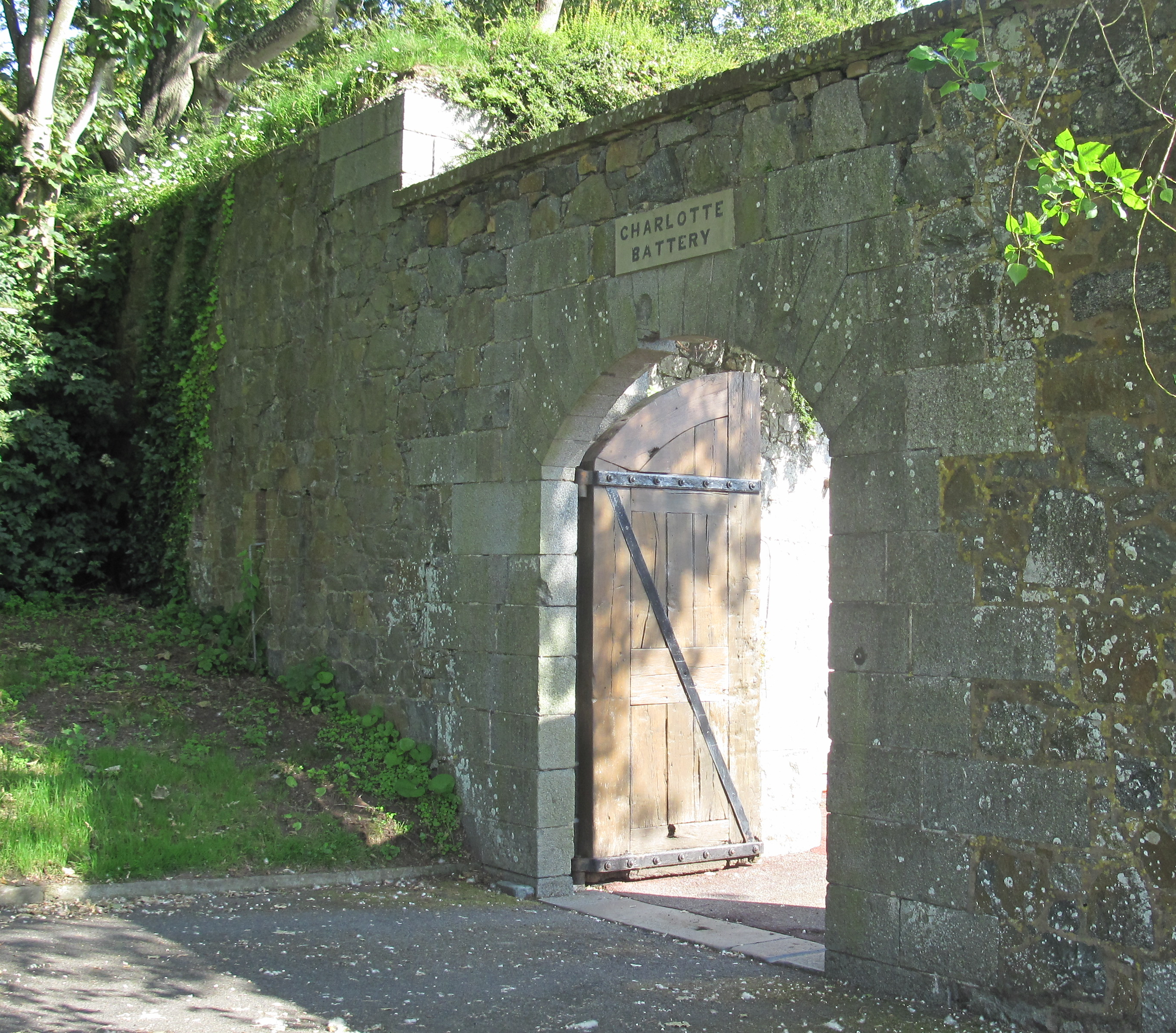
Fort George (3) Charlotte Battery gate

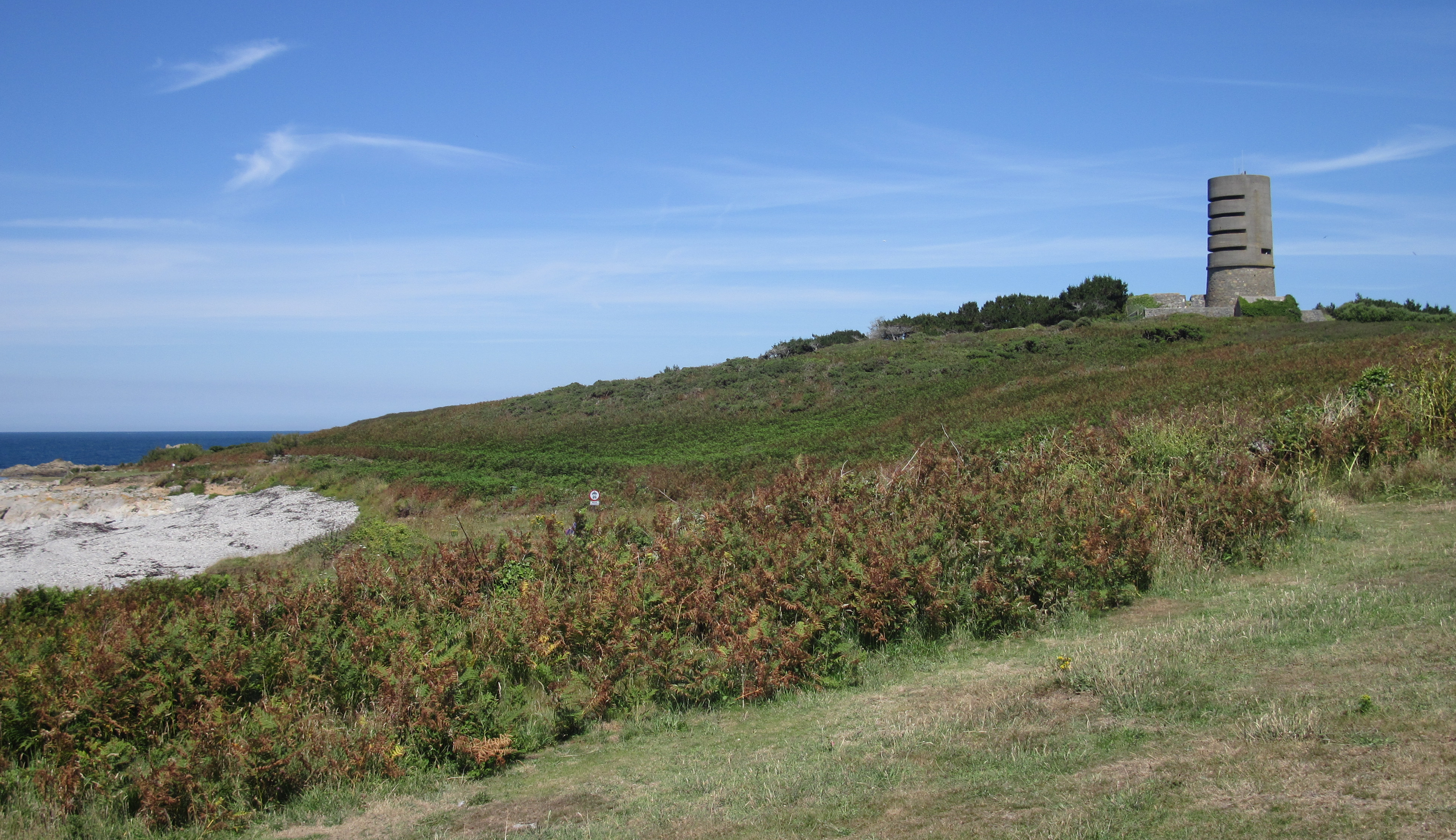
Fort Sausmarez

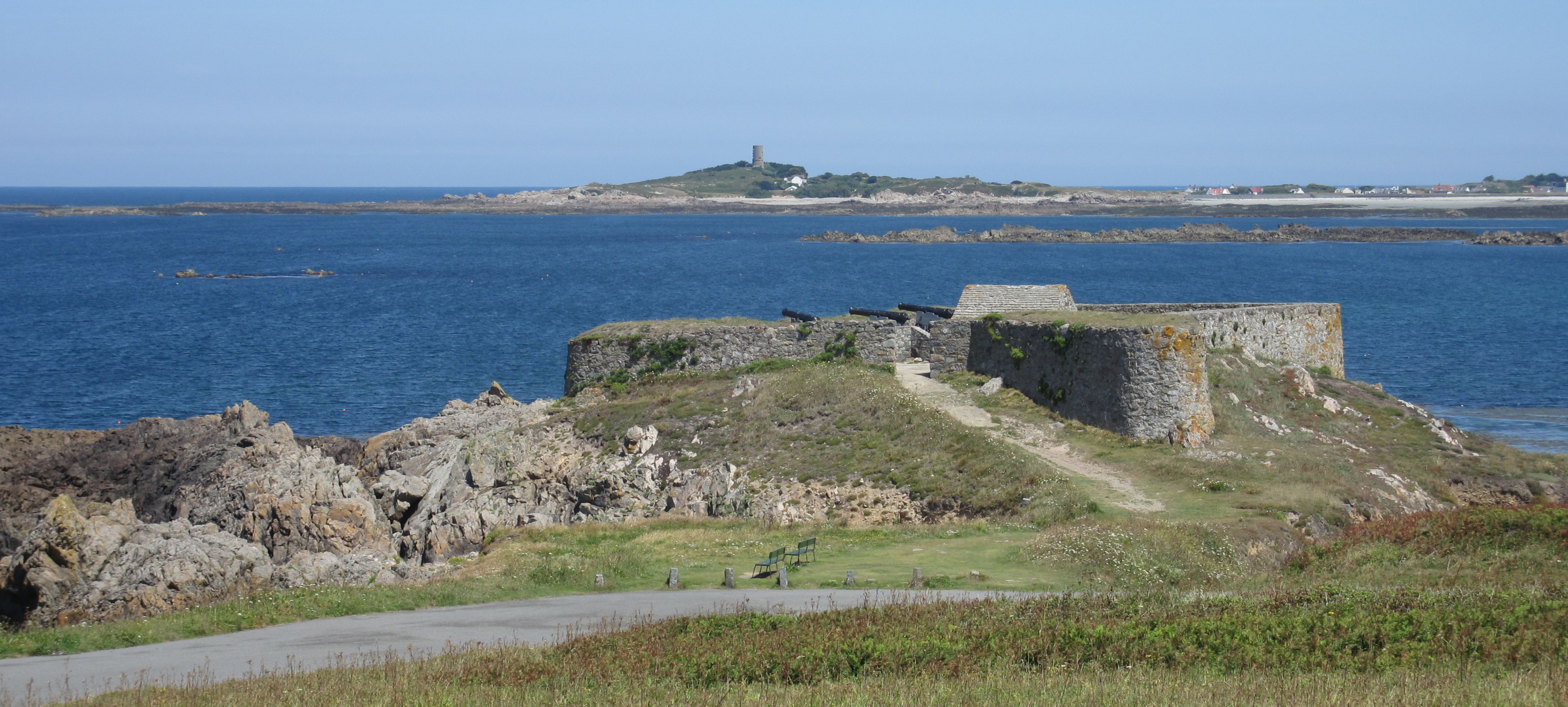
Fort Pezeries

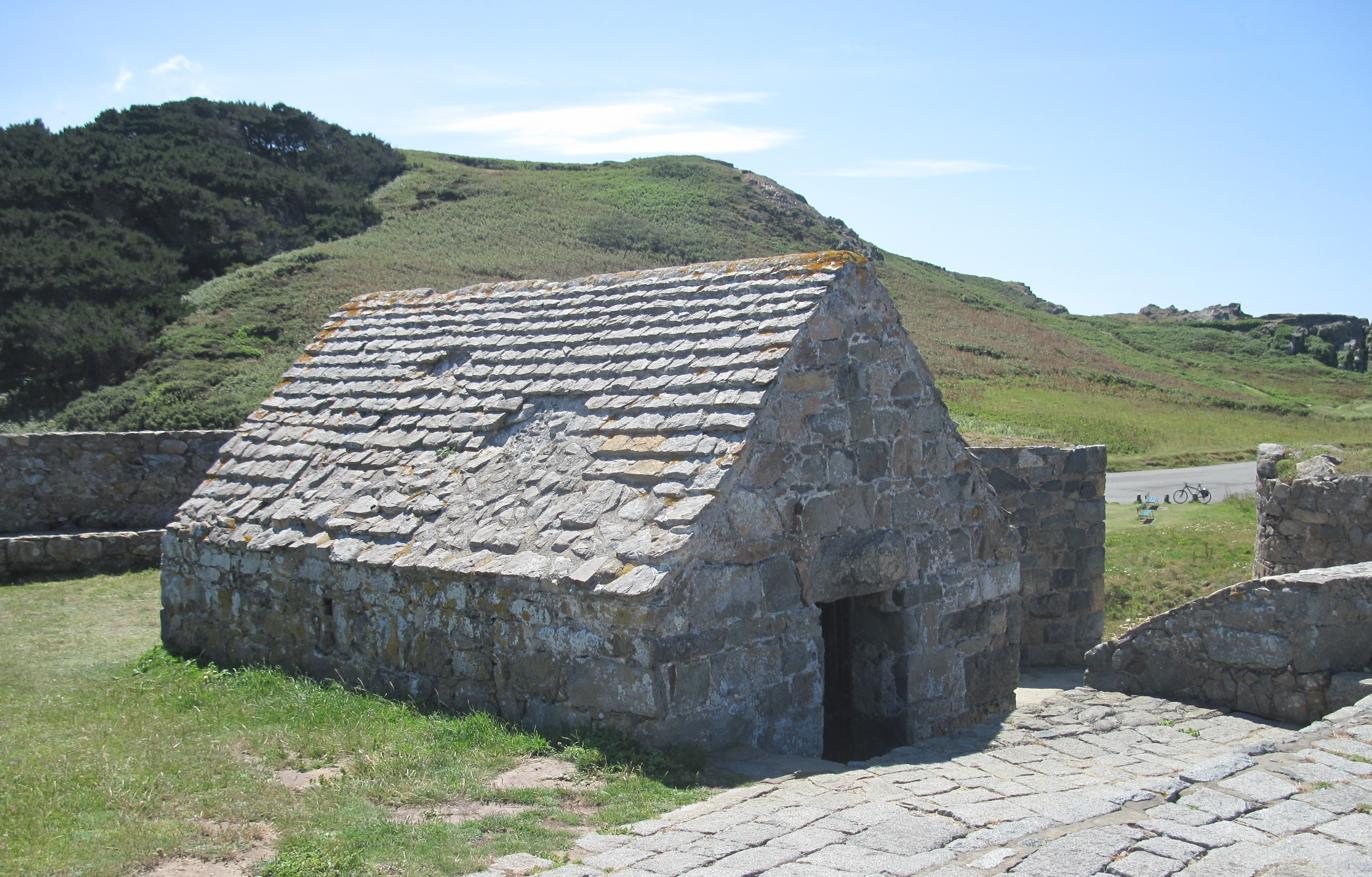
Fort Pezeries magazine

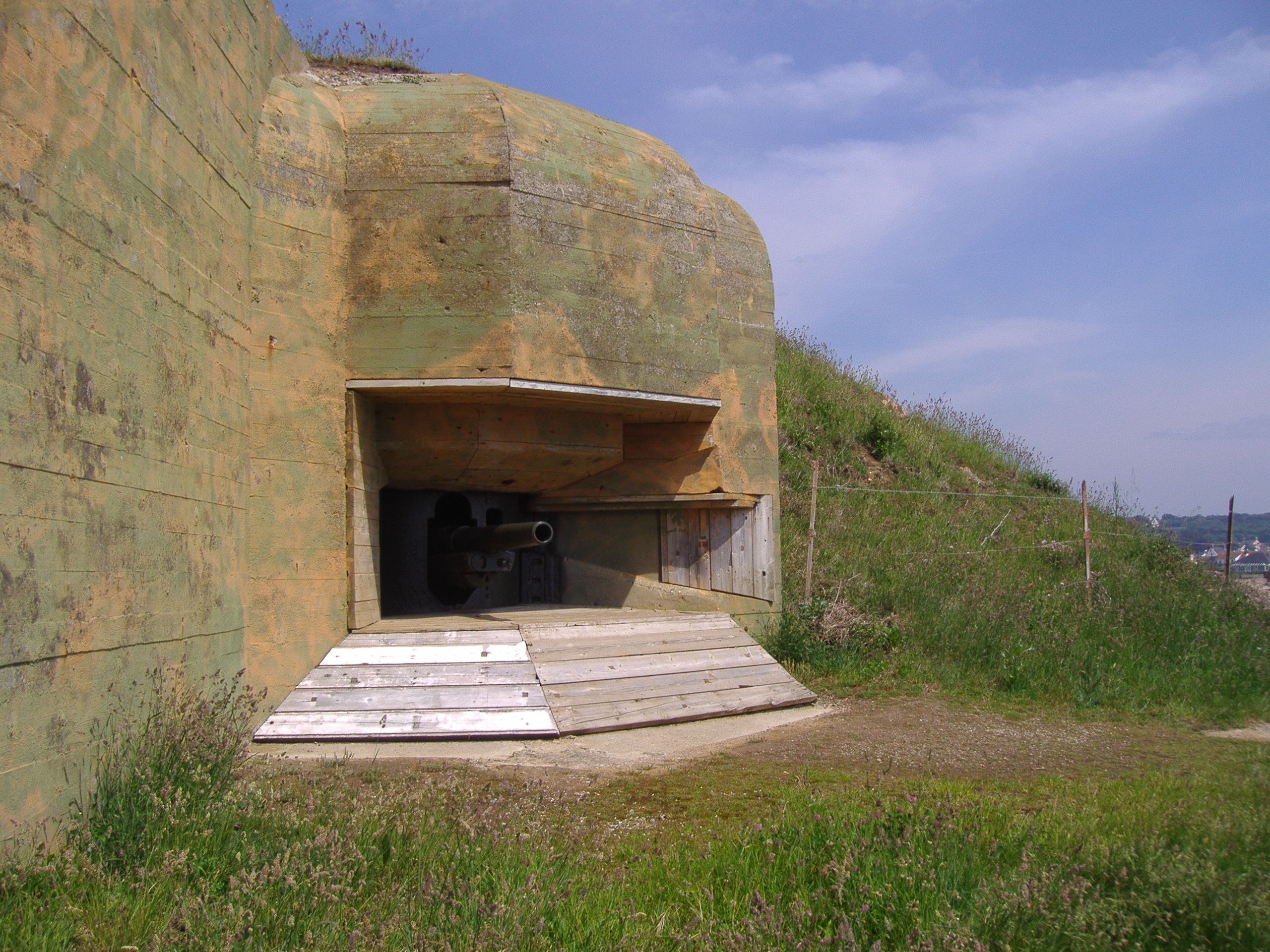
German 10.5 cm Casement

== See also ==
- Guernsey
- History of Guernsey
