= Widerstandsnest Rundturm =

German fortification on Vazon Bay, Guernsey

- Wn. Rundturm
- Part of Fortress Guernsey
- Vazon Bay, Castel, Guernsey
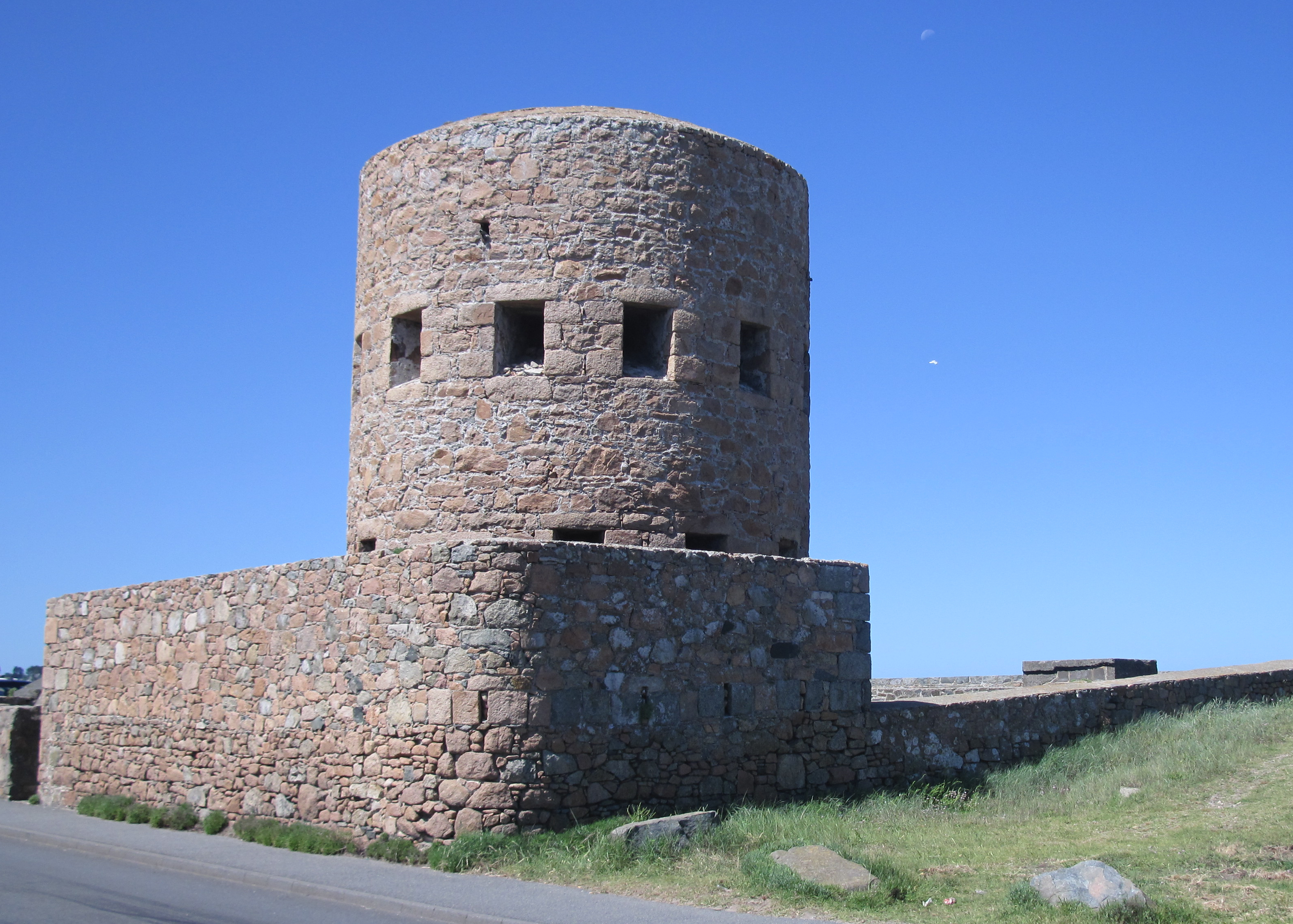
- Martello tower Vazon Tower No. 12 built into the German fortification

Site information
- Type: Coastal fortification
- Controlled by: (Nazi Germany) Wehrmacht
- Condition: Disused

Location
- Coordinates: 49°28′9.38″N 2°36′22.78″W

Site history
- Built: 1941–1944
- Materials: Reinforced concrete, granite stones
- Battles/wars: Atlantic Wall coastal defense

Garrison information
- Garrison: Wehrmacht

Widerstandsnest Rundturm (abbreviated as Wn. Rundturm; English: "Round Tower Strongpoint") was a World War II German coastal fortification located on the sea wall of Vazon Bay in Castel, Guernsey. Built by occupying German forces between 1941 and 1944, it was a part of Fortress Guernsey and Adolf Hitler's Atlantic Wall. It integrates pre-existing Guernsey loophole tower Vazon Tower No. 12 into its structure.

== Background ==
After the occupation of the Channel Islands by Germany in June 1940, the German armed forces considered the pre-existing Napoleonic British coastal defences obsolete and insufficient to be used in modern warfare. Since Vazon Bay (codenamed Rundbucht/ Round Bay among the Germans) is a large and shallow sandy beach, it was viewed by the Wehrmacht as one that could be used by the Allies as a point of invasion. The coastline of the bay was therefore well-defended with a series of several forts, one of which was Wn. Rundturm.

== Architectural Features & Armament ==
Wn. Rundturm was designed to provide both anti-tank capabilities and close-quarters infantry defense against troops landing on the beach.

The structure was built directly around, and integrated into, Vazon Tower No. 12, a Guernsey loophole tower built between 1778 and 1779. The German forces adapted the old tower to serve as observation points and ammunition storage.

The defense of the structure was a 4.7cm PaK 36(t) anti-tank gun casemate. This gun casemate was constructed within the sea wall using granite cladding, enabling it to fit in seamlessly with the surrounding natural coastline.

=== Personnel Shelters and Infantry Positions ===
- Shelter in Wellblech: Field-enhanced (Verstärkt feldmässig) personnel shelter contained corrugated iron lining for use by the garrison troops.
- RFO Water Supply Bunker: An RFO water bunker that includes Trinkwasser (drinking water) tank.
- Ringstånde (Tobruk Pits): These Tobruk pits have been incorporated within the sea wall to install MG 34 or MG 42 machine guns.

== Current Status ==
Today, Wn. Rundturm remains visible along Vazon Bay. The underground bunkers inside are sealed off and in poor condition, but the 4.7 cm anti-tank casemate with granite exterior and some of the Tobruk concrete fortifications can be seen by the public. It worked in coordination with the nearby Fort Hommet on the northern headland of the bay.

== See also ==
- German fortification of Guernsey
- Guernsey loophole towers
- Fort Hommet
- Atlantic Wall
