= Sir John Doyle, 1st Baronet =

British Army officer and politician (1756–1834)

General Sir John Doyle GCB Bt KCH
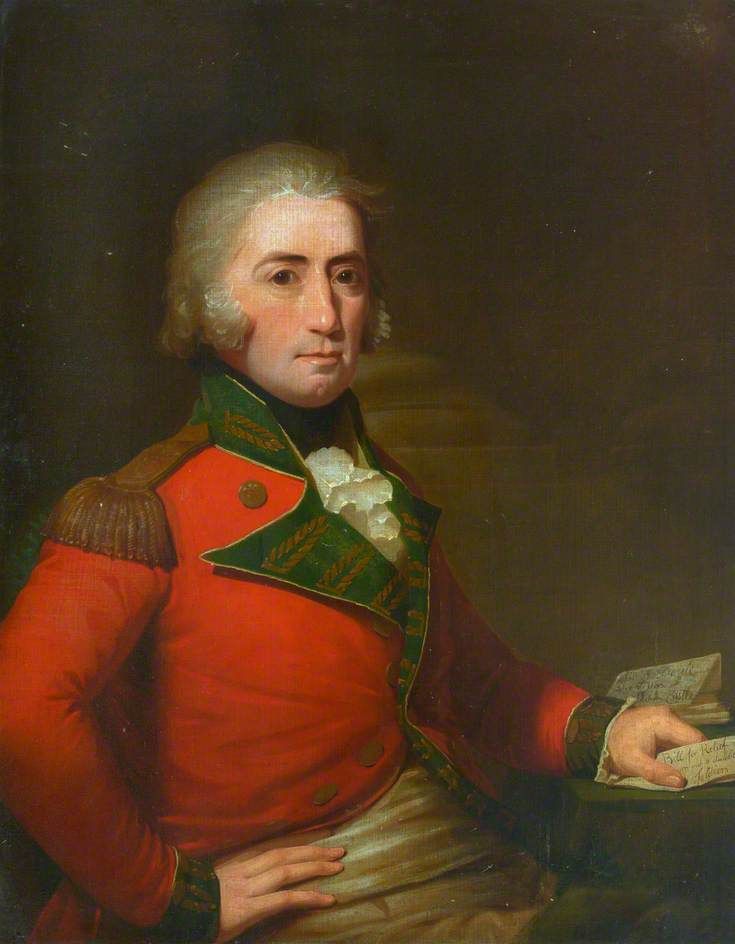
- Portrait by William Cuming, c. 1797
- Born: 1756; Dublin, Ireland
- Died: 8 August 1834 (aged 77–78)
- Relatives: Welbore Ellis Doyle (brother)
- Military career
- Allegiance: Great Britain; United Kingdom
- Branch: British Army
- Service years: 1771–1820s
- Rank: General
- Conflicts: American War of Independence; Battle of Long Island; Battle of Harlem Heights; Battle of Brandywine; Battle of Germantown (WIA); Battle of Monmouth; Siege of Charleston; Battle of Springfield; Battle of Camden; French Revolutionary Wars; Flanders campaign; French invasion of Egypt and Syria

General Sir John Doyle, 1st Baronet, GCB, KCH (1756 – 8 August 1834) was a British Army officer and politician who served in the American War of Independence and the French Revolutionary and Napoleonic Wars. He was elected Member of Parliament for Mullingar in the Irish House of Commons in 1783, and went on to serve as Secretary of War in Dublin Castle administration.

Doyle raised his own regiment, the 87th Regiment of Foot, for the French Revolutionary Wars in 1793 and served in Holland, Gibraltar and Egypt. His efforts were greatly appreciated by King George III, who took the trouble to write to the Earl Marshall, "... so that his [Doyle's] zeal and exertions in our service may be known to posterity".

The latter part of his career included his appointment as Private Secretary to George IV the Prince of Wales. He was also appointed Lieutenant Governor of Guernsey in 1803 where he served until 1813. He was also active in Guernsey as Deputy Grand Master of the Freemasons. He was appointed Knight Bachelor in 1813 and General in 1819. On 29 October 1825 he was created a baronet, but the baronetcy became extinct upon his death.

== Personal life ==
John Doyle was born in Dublin in 1756, the fourth son of Charles and Elizabeth Doyle of Bramblestown, County Kilkenny. He entered Trinity College Dublin in July 1768 to study law, but when his father died in March 1771 he joined the army in March 1771.

Doyle was the uncle of women's political rights campaigner Anna Wheeler, previously Doyle, who, in 1812, took her daughters to stay with him and his family in Guernsey, having walked out on her husband in County Limerick.

== Military career ==
Doyle started his military career in March 1771 when he purchased an ensigncy and joined the 48th (Northamptonshire) Regiment of Foot. He purchased a promotion and rose to the rank of Lieutenant in 1773.

=== American War of Independence ===
Doyle transferred to the 40th (2nd Somersetshire) Regiment of Foot on its being ordered overseas, where he served with distinction in the American War of Independence (1775–1783). Serving as lieutenant of light cavalry at Boston he became Adjutant to the battalion. He was involved in the Battle of Long Island in August 1776, where he recovered the body of his commanding officer, Lieutenant-Colonel James Grant, under enemy fire. He then fought at the Battle of Harlem Heights, In 1777 he fought at the Battle of Brandywine and Battle of Germantown (where he was wounded).

His wound changed the course of his American campaign because he was appointed to assist Lord Rawdon (Francis Rawdon-Hastings, 1st Marquess of Hastings) to raise the Volunteers of Ireland regiment (also known as 2nd American Regiment and which would shortly become a regular unit, the 105th Regiment of Foot), and wherein he was promoted to captain. This unit then fought at the Battle of Monmouth Courthouse in 1778, and now appointed and acting Major of Brigade moved with the Regiment to South Carolina participating in the Siege of Charleston in 1780, before being mentioned in dispatches after fighting at the Battle of Camden. He also fought at the Battle of Springfield.

Following the peace in America in 1782 Captain Doyle returned to Ireland, entering politics.

=== French Revolutionary Wars ===
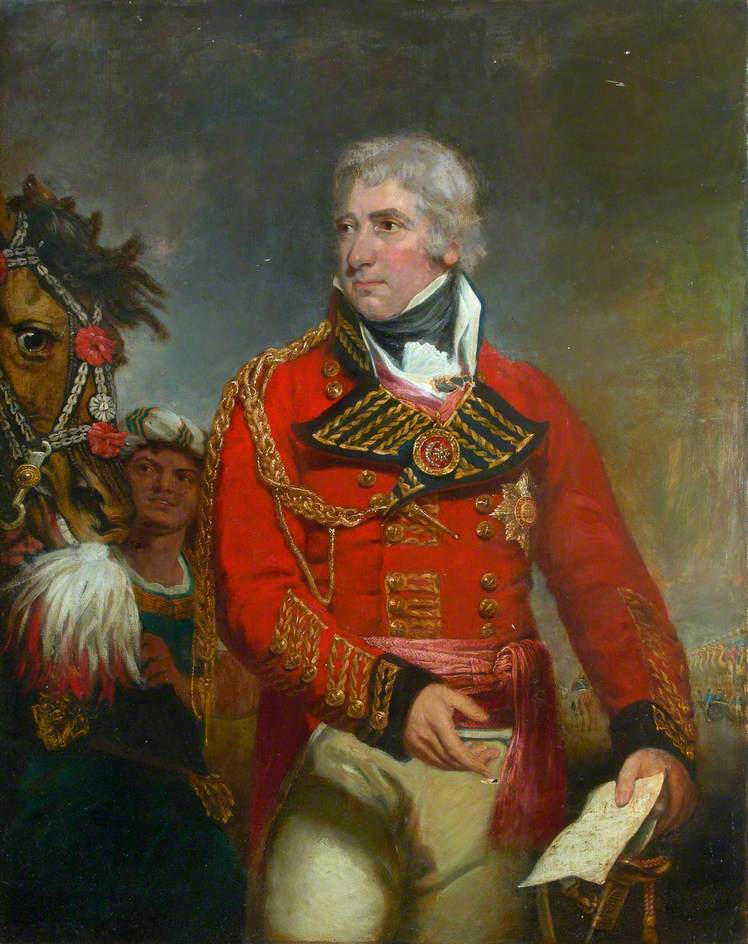
Portrait of Doyle by James Ramsay

Following France declaring war on Great Britain, in September 1793, Doyle raised his own regiment, the 87th (The Prince of Wales's Irish) Regiment; they were also known as The Prince of Wales Irish Heroes. Raised in rank to brevet colonel, he led the unit under the Duke of York in the Flanders campaign of 1793–1795. He served at the siege of Valenciennes 13 June-28 July 1793 and distinguished himself at Alost during Moira's retreat 1794 where he was wounded in a cavalry action, needing to return to Britain to recover. His Regiment, sent in his absence, to Bergen op Zoom where the Catholic town promptly surrendered to the French, making the whole Regiment prisoners of war.

Returning to Ireland he was appointed head of the war department and from 1796 until 1799 as Secretary of War. The release of his Regiment as prisoners saw Doyle appointed Colonel of the 87th Foot on 3 May 1796. Appointed a brevet Brigadier-General he was appointed in charge of the land forces in the proposed assault on the Texel in October 1796 with the hope of destroying the Dutch fleet, however storms resulted in the ships abandoning the attempt. Brigadier General Doyle was then ordered to Gibraltar, however on his way to the port of embarkation was attacked by highwaymen and badly wounded twice. Having recovered, he proceeded to join the staff in Gibraltar.

Confirmed in the rank of brigadier-general and appointed to command the 4th brigade, he served under Abercromby and Hutchinson in Egypt in 1801, and saw action at Manresa, Marabout, and Ramanieh 9 May. On 17 May 1801, in the Egyptian desert he led the 250 troopers of the 12th Light Dragoons to capture the 600 man, 460 camel French Dromedary Regiment (French: Régiment de Dromadaires) by persuading them to surrender without a fight. The surrender of Cairo, concluding with the Alexandria in September. He distinguished himself during these operations leading to promotion to Major-General on 29 April 1802.

=== Napoleonic Wars ===
He was appointed Lieutenant Governor of Guernsey in 1803. After declaring a "state of emergency" in 1804, he undertook to improve the dilapidated defences and to improve upon them by building over 60 additional gun batteries at likely landing points. Costing considerable sums of money, he managed to persuade, through eloquence, the Island to pay for these costs, as the Islands were in imminent danger of invasion from France.

Doyle actively organised the defence in the Bailiwick of Guernsey, he oversaw the draining of land at Braye du Valle to connect the tidal north of the island to the main island, using the proceeds of the sale of the land to pay for the construction of military quality roads. He organised three Martello towers to be built, including Fort Grey, to supplement the existing Guernsey loophole towers, progressing and completing Fort George. Working closely with the Royal Guernsey Militia and bringing to the island ordnance and regular infantry. In addition he improved, in a like manner, the defences of Alderney.

== Public administration and diplomacy ==
Escutcheon of the Doyle baronets of Guernsey, the title awarded to Doyle in 1825

After the American Revolutionary War Doyle returned to Ireland on half pay, so that he could be recalled to the army. He was a founding member of the Irish Whig Club and was an early advocate for the emancipation of Catholics. In 1783 he was elected MP for Mullingar in the Irish House of Commons Giving speeches to the Parliament of Ireland at Parliament House in favour of providing relief for starving unemployed Irish workers and their families, for which he was awarded the freedom of Dublin city, of improving the situation for disabled soldiers in Ireland, pleading the cause of foundlings and Catholic emancipation.

Brought to the notice of the Prince of Wales, Doyle was appointed his Private Secretary. He progressed to serve as Secretary of War in Irish politics from 1796 until 1799. Doyle was appointed as Lieutenant Governor of Guernsey from 1803 to 1813. He was elected MP for Newport, IoW in the UK Parliament in 1806, sitting until 1807. Doyle was lauded by the government and people of Guernsey, and Alderney. He was made a Baronet in 1805, promoted to Lieutenant-General on 24 April 1808, made a Knight of the Bath in 1812 and promoted to a full General in 1819. Governor of Charlemont Castle from 1818 until his death.

== Death and commemoration ==
George III wrote to the Earl Marshall, Charles Howard, 11th Duke of Norfolk: ... so that his (Doyle's) zeal and exertions in our service may be known to posterity.

Doyle was Deputy Grand Master of the Orange Lodge No.116 of the Freemasons. In 1806 he was presented with the 'Doyle Cup' which has been in the collection of Museum of Freemasonry, London, since 1938. The cup shows Doyle's freemasonry and military career in the French Revolutionary Wars. The lid bears the arms of the Masonic Ancients Grand Lodge and a Royal Crown. The spout bears the Prince of Wales's feathers – signifying that Doyle was colonel of the Prince of Wales Royal Irish Regiment, that he had been initiated in Prince of Wales Lodge and the Prince of Wales was Grand Master of the Premier Grand Lodge of which he was also a member.

A second Masonic cup follows the general design of the first, but shows scenes from the American War of Independence. It was presented by the Mariners Lodge and remains in Guernsey. Guernsey has commemorated Doyle in several ways: the Doyle Monument at Jerbourg Point; Doyle Road; Fort Doyle; Doyle Street; Doyle Lane; Doyle Close; and The Doyle – (previously the site of Doyle Barracks).

== See also ==
- John Milley Doyle

Government offices
Preceded by Sir Hew Dalrymple	Lieutenant Governor of Guernsey; 1803–1816	Succeeded by Henry Bayly
Baronetage of the United Kingdom
New creation	Baronet (of Guernsey); 1825–1834	Extinct
Preceded by Munro baronets	Doyle baronets of Guernsey; 29 October 1825	Succeeded by Dalrymple-Horn-Elphinstone baronets
