= Chateau des Marais, Guernsey =

Castle in Guernsey

Coordinates: 49°28′18.6″N 2°32′18.9″W

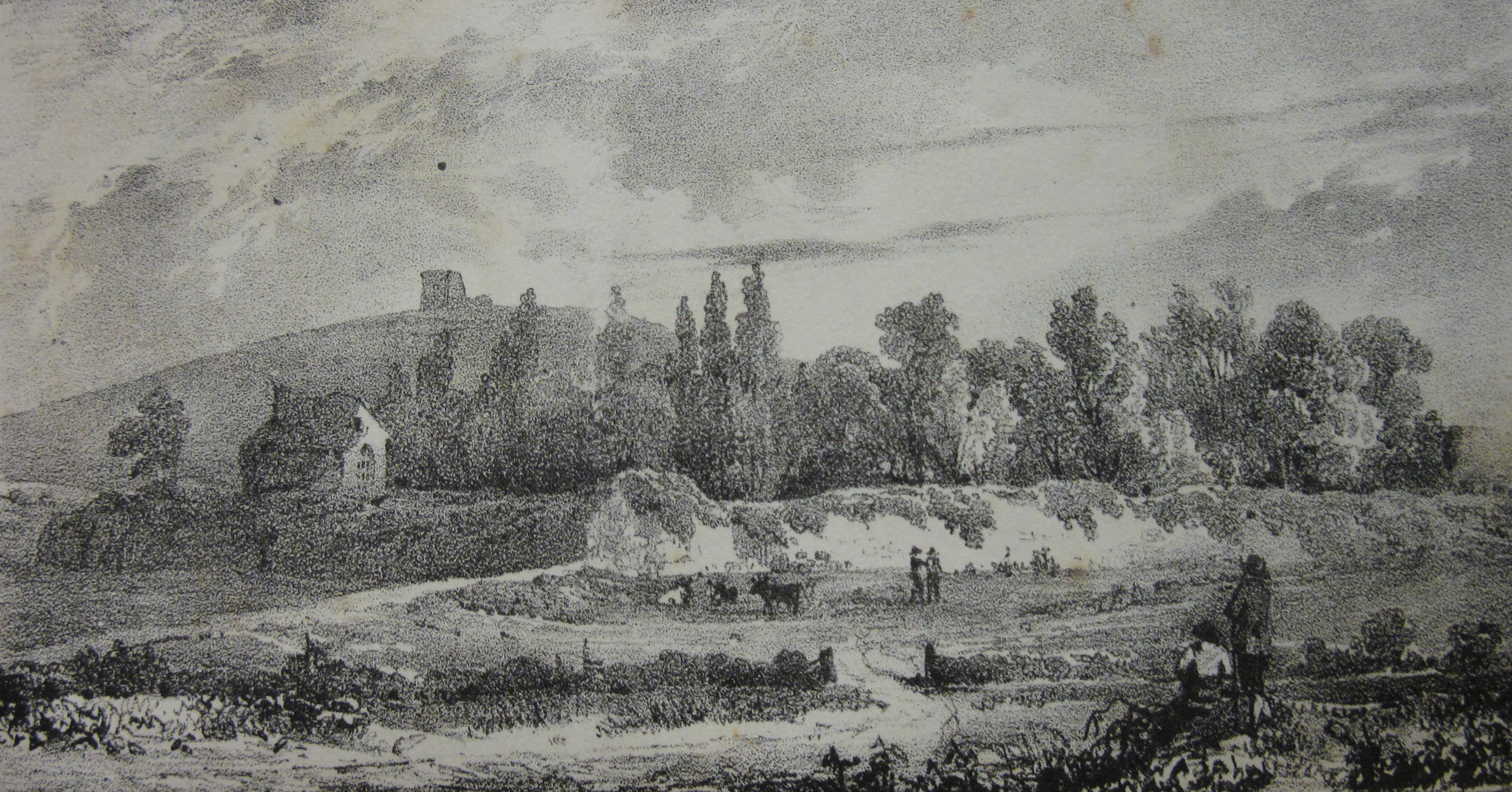
Chateau des Marais in 1826

The Chateau des Marais is a protected chateau in Saint Sampson, Guernsey. The colloquial name is Ivy Castle. A moated medieval castle dating from before the 12th-century .

== History ==
Neolithic settlers from 3,500 to 1,500 BC made use of the mound, evidenced with archaeological finds.

=== Middle ages ===
In 1170 a fortified structure existed on the site. Mentioned again in 1244 and 1292 it was already considered old .

In the 13th century it was converted into a Motte-and-bailey castle the top of the mound was flattened, the ditch or moat dug out with the excavated soil being used to level and raise the inner and outer defences. An outer wall was built in the marsh, which was drained to make the centre of the fort dry, into Belle Grave Bay by cutting through the shingle bank.

It is believed a chapel was built, however no evidence of its location has been found. Documentary evidence as late as 1330 refers to the chaplain at the castle.

The fort fell into disuse after it was superseded by Castle Cornet which was built in the mid 13th-century. It may have changed use to become a refuge for people and animals.

=== Early modern period ===
In the early 17th century a folk memory still existed of the function of the castle. Royal commissioners described it as 'a very ruinous and decayed castle belonging to His Majesty, ‘’of long ago used for the Mansion or seat of the Captains and Governors of this isle’’.

In 1726 a first hand account is available of how the castle has been left to fall to ruin. Botanist Thomas Knowlton was visiting the island to research the cultivation of the Guernsey Lily and while here went to the site and described it as formerly a strong place, but now is nothing but a heap of ruins and walls covered with ivy, which I suppose gives it its name.

=== Late modern period ===
Refortified in the Napoleonic era. The stone fort that we see on the site today was constructed, the ditch was re-cut, musket firing steps were built around the outer bailey, the inner bailey was walled in and a powder magazine was built as well as other buildings, probably including a barracks.

After the war, falling back into disrepair, it became the Governor's garden and the home to several pigsties. A distillery was also located in the castle, producing alcohol from potatoes for export from Guernsey, established in 1827 it burnt down in 1832.

During the German occupation of the island, the fort was used as a defence area and a command bunker was constructed inside the walls. Machine gun posts and communication trenches were also built.

Ownership of the land changed from the War Department and Her Majesty’s Commissioners of Crown Lands to the ownership of the States of Guernsey.

== Design ==
An irregular motte, built on a small rocky hillock, surrounded by water meadows that would originally have been a wide marsh called Marais d’Orgueil. Surrounded by a moat the castle has a weak and crudely built external stone wall with an inner and outer bailey built in the 13th century.

The re-fortification in the 18th-century saw walls built in the format we see today.

== Archaeology ==
During the 1970s excavations uncovered early jewellery, pottery and flints showing that the area was settled in at least the late Neolithic period if not earlier . Neolithic standing stones are in the area.

There is a lack of evidence from the Iron Age period.

The 13th-century evidence shows the undergrowth was burnt to clear the site, builders marked out the site with standing stones, turf was cut and made the embankment which was topped with clay and granite.

== Access and current use ==
The Chateau des Marais is open to the public, accessible via footpaths from Ivy Castle Lane or Victoria Avenue. Parking is available off Sir John Leale Avenue, off Victoria Avenue.

== Protection ==
The whole of the Chateau de Marais was listed as a Protected Monument on 26 March 1938, reference PM90.

== The arts ==
- Francis Grose (1731–1791) created a copper engraved print Marsh Castle, 1777. Published in The Antiquities of England and Wales.
- Joshua Gosselin (1739–1813) Pen ink and watercolour - Château des Marais Guernsey, 1793

== See also ==
- Fortifications of Guernsey
- Guernsey Museums
