= Munro baronets of Lindertis (1825) =

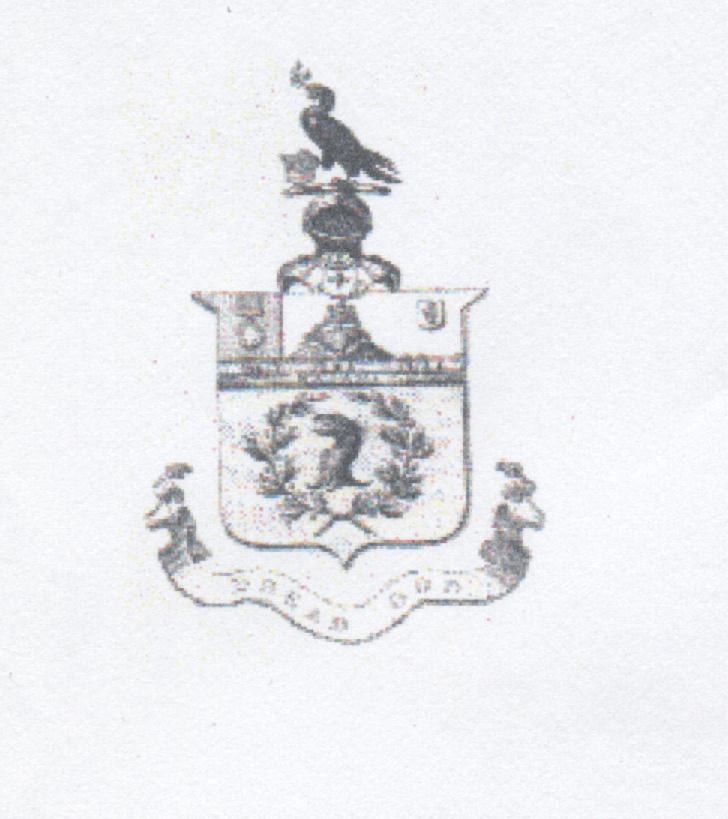
Coat of arms of Sir Thomas Munro, showing above the Munro Eagle an Indian hill fort and underneath it the name Badamy, a fort Sir Thomas captured in 1818

The Munro baronetcy, of Lindertis in the County of Forfar, was created in the Baronetage of the United Kingdom on 6 August 1825 for the soldier and colonial administrator Thomas Munro. He was a major general in the Army and served as Governor of Madras between 1820 and 1827.

The Munro Baronets of Linderits descend from the Munros of Culcraggie, a cadet branch of the Clan Munro who descend from George Munro, 10th Baron of Foulis.

The Official Roll marks the baronetcy "vacant", after the death of the 7th Baronet.

== Munro baronets, of Lindertis (1825) ==
- Sir Thomas Munro, 1st Baronet (died 1827)
- Sir Thomas Munro, 2nd Baronet (1819–1901) He was the first to be designated "of Lindertis", after the property acquired by the Trustees of his father's estate in 1838.
- Sir Campbell Munro, 3rd Baronet (1823–1913)
- Sir Hugh Munro, 4th Baronet (1856–1919)
- Sir Thomas Torquhil Alfonso Munro, 5th Baronet (1901–1985)
- Sir Alasdair Thomas Ian Munro, 6th Baronet (1927–2014)
- Sir Keith Gordon Munro, 7th Baronet (1959–2026)
- Zachary Adrian Munro, presumed 8th Baronet (born 1992) as heir to the 7th Baronet.

== Notes ==
Baronetage of the United Kingdom
Preceded by Lowther baronets	Munro baronets of Lindertis; 6 August 1825	Succeeded by Doyle baronets
