= Fort George, Guernsey =

Fort in the United Kingdom

Coordinates: 49.4463°N 2.5305°W

Fort George
- Saint Peter Port, Guernsey

Site information
- Type: Fort

Fort George is a fort in Saint Peter Port, Guernsey, and was built to become the main island military headquarters and to protect barracks to house the island garrison for the British Army, in place of Castle Cornet.

Planned during the Anglo-French War (1778–83), construction started in 1780 and was completed in 1812. It was built to accommodate the increase in the number of troops stationed on the island to deter the anticipated French invasion, such as the attempted Jersey one in 1779 and the one that resulted in French troops landing in Jersey in January 1781, which resulted in the Battle of Jersey in the centre of Saint Helier.

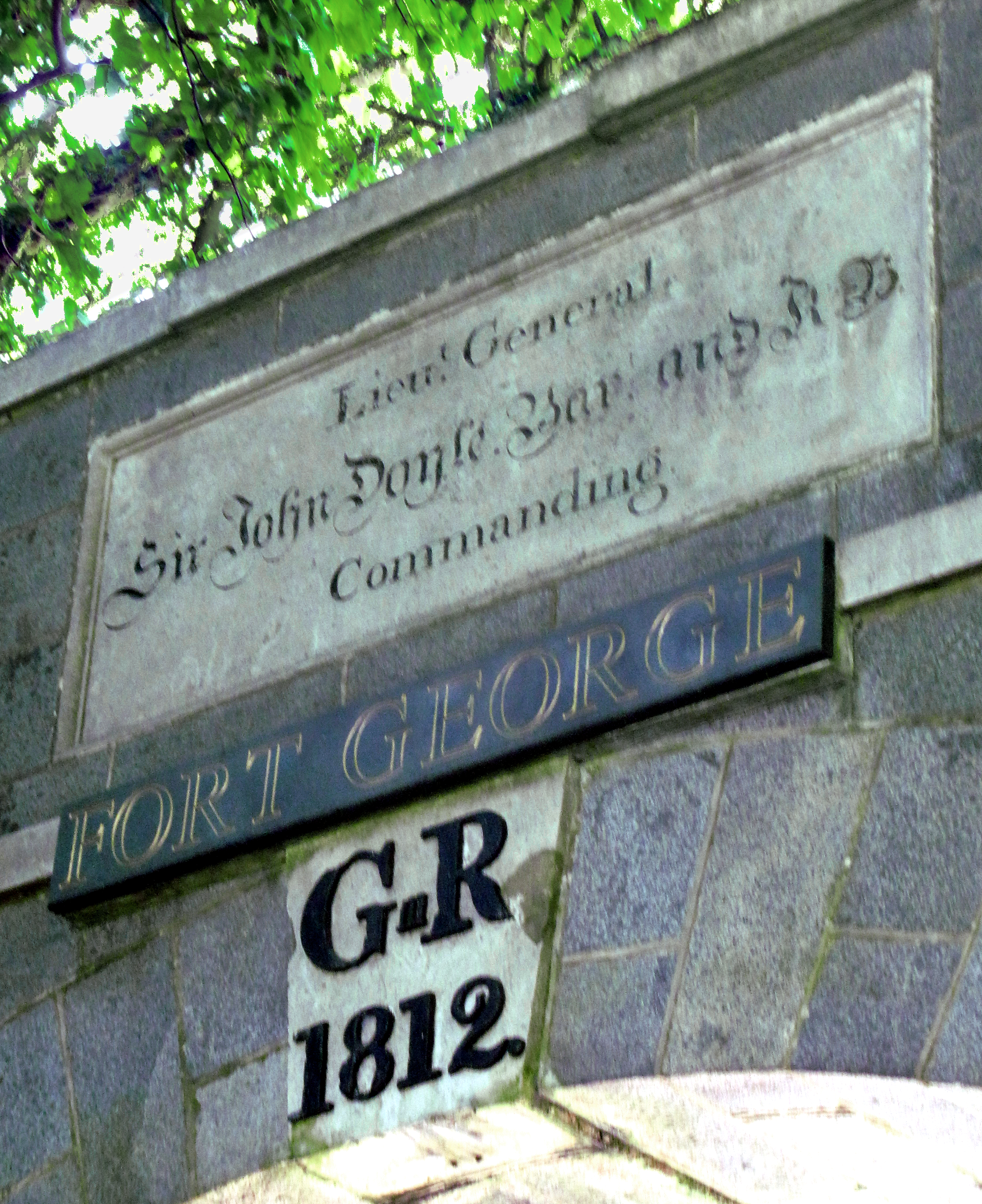
Plaques over the entrance of Fort George

== History ==
The area occupied by the fort was excellent corn fields but with one and a half regiments moved into the island as defence following the start of the American War of Independence, were used by the military before the construction of the current fort. In 1775 and 1776, an epidemic amongst highland soldiers stationed at the fort area decimated the unit, and the disease spread to civilians in neighboring parishes. The old fort was in a poor state and General Charles Grey, 1st Earl Grey, Governor of Guernsey from 1797 to 1807 was having difficulty persuading the island to improve its defences. In 1798 in frustration, he ordered the part built a fort to be demolished so as not to give potential invaders a haven, it was not destroyed and construction work continued.

The design was that of a star fort with a bastioned trace. A detached redoubt, Fort Irwin, was linked to the fort. To seaward the Clarence Battery was constructed.

On 27 March 1783, there was a mutiny in Guernsey by 500 regular soldiers, mainly Irish soldiers in the recently created 104th Regiment, who were in winter quarters in Fort George, caused possibly by some discharged men from the recently disbanded 83rd Regiment who had just been sent to join the 104th on the island. The soldiers demanded that the fort gates be left open so they could come and go as they pleased; however, whilst this was agreed, the soldiers inside the fort fired at their officers, forcing them to withdraw from the fort. Both the 18th Regiment (the Royal Irish) and the Guernsey Militia turned out with 6 pieces of artillery. Volleys of shots were fired by the rebels, but when the militia outflanked the rebels, they surrendered. The Government of Guernsey gave a public thanks to the 18th Regiment and militiamen, awarding them 100 guineas. Two men were wounded, 36 ringleaders arrested. In April, the 104th Regiment was transferred to Southampton and disbanded there in May.

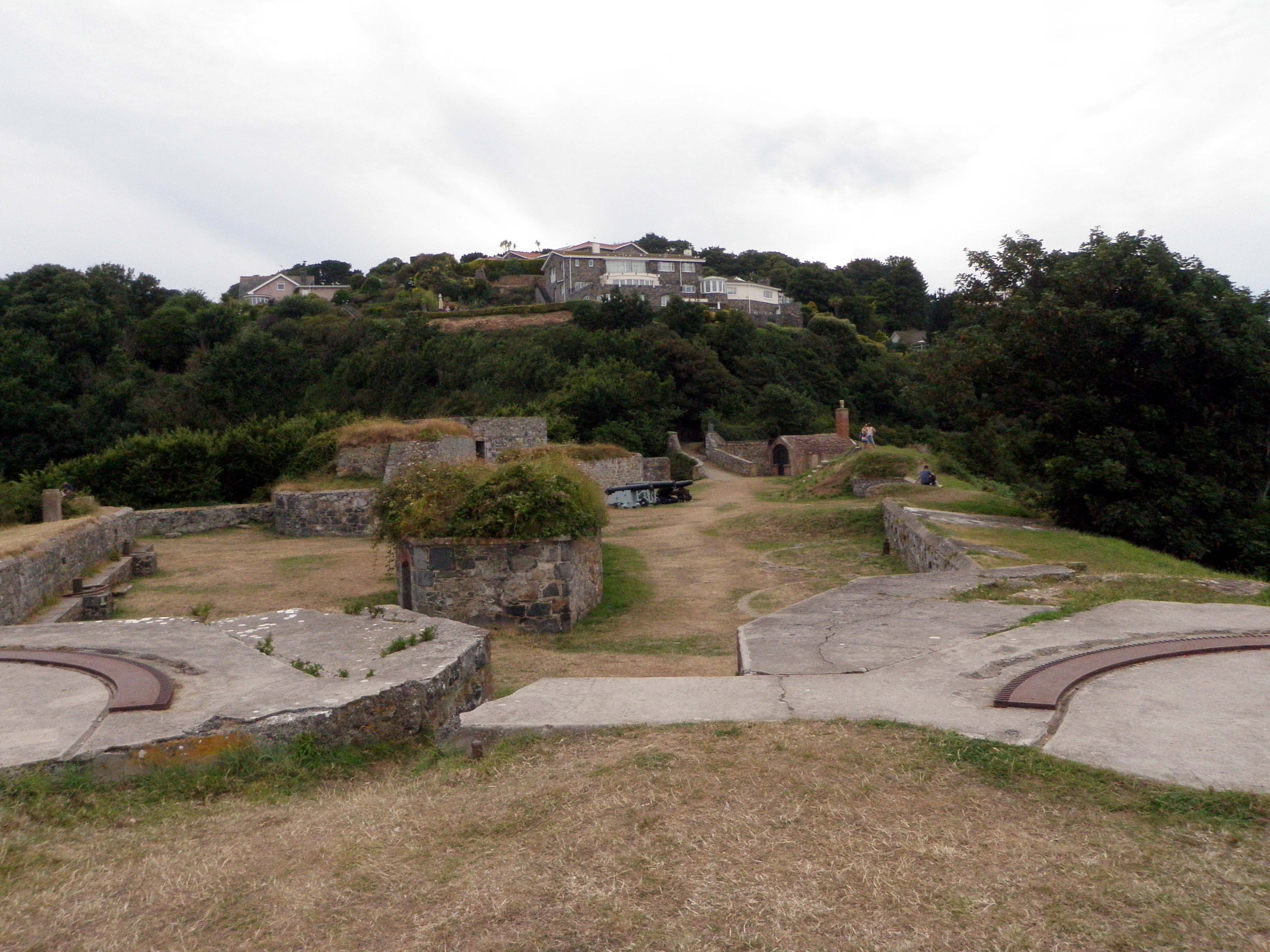
View of Fort George from the preserved Clarence Battery. Luxury housing, some of which is visible above the battery, has replaced most of the old fort.

From 1794 to 1819 a company from an invalid battalion of the Royal Artillery was based at Fort George. Duelling was not permitted in Guernsey, however duels took place, the most famous recorded being between two officers based at the fort in 1795, fought at L'Hyvreuse Avenue, St Peter Port, where Major Byng of the 92nd Regiment died after challenging the Regimental Surgeon over a matter of honour for not standing for the National Anthem.

Before the barracks were built in the fort, islanders were required to provide accommodation for soldiers who could not be accommodated in Castle Cornet. Each Parish had its quota and if men were quartered in public houses or private dwellings the parish authorities were liable for the cost.

Lieutenant-General John Doyle was appointed Lieutenant Governor in 1803 and commander of all forces in Guernsey. After declaring a state of emergency in 1804, he undertook many works to improve the defence of the Island, including the draining of the Braye du Valle, improving some roads to military standard and building forts and batteries around the coast. The building of Fort George progressed more rapidly with Lt. Col. John Mackelcan (allegedly the illegitimate son of George III and Hannah Lightfoot) promoted to Commander of the Royal Engineers at the fort in 1803. The fort was completed in 1812 and Major-General Sir John Doyle became the Commanding Officer.

Families of the soldiers stationed in the fort normally lodged in St Peter Port. In 1832 J. M. W. Turner sketched the fort. The last person to be executed for murder in Guernsey in 1853, a John Tapner, worked as a clerk in the Engineers Department in Fort George; his botched robbery was matched with a bungled hanging. The fort attracted dubious activities with 'Maisons de débauche' being established close to the fort. They became such a problem that a law was passed in 1895 to restrict their activities, but it was not sufficient and a further law was passed in 1912 giving powers to examine women for diseases, detain them in the hospital if necessary and to deport foreign women deemed 'dangereuses pour la santé publique'.

The Royal Guernsey Light Infantry trained at Fort George before the 1st Battalion sailed on 1 June 1917 on their way to the Western Front, the 2nd Battalion remaining at the fort as a training battalion.

During the Second World War the fort was occupied by German forces who gave it the name Stützpunkt Georgefest, constructing a number of emplacements and a Luftwaffe radar early warning station "Adlerschloss" with 2 x Freya, 2 x Giant FuMG 65 Würzburg-Riese radar installations and a Dezimetergerat microwave communication station. Attempts by Allied aircraft to destroy the radar station before the Normandy landings in June 1944 were ineffective, with allied aircraft shot down on 2 and 5 June. Unexploded bombs occasionally surface.

The States of Guernsey bought the land from the Crown in 1958. In 1967 the land was sold to a developer, Fort George Developments, with the aim of building 120 luxury houses amongst the stronger of the military buildings, the main barrack buildings being demolished. Objections to the planned building work were rejected despite 21% of the population signing a petition against the works.

== Structure ==
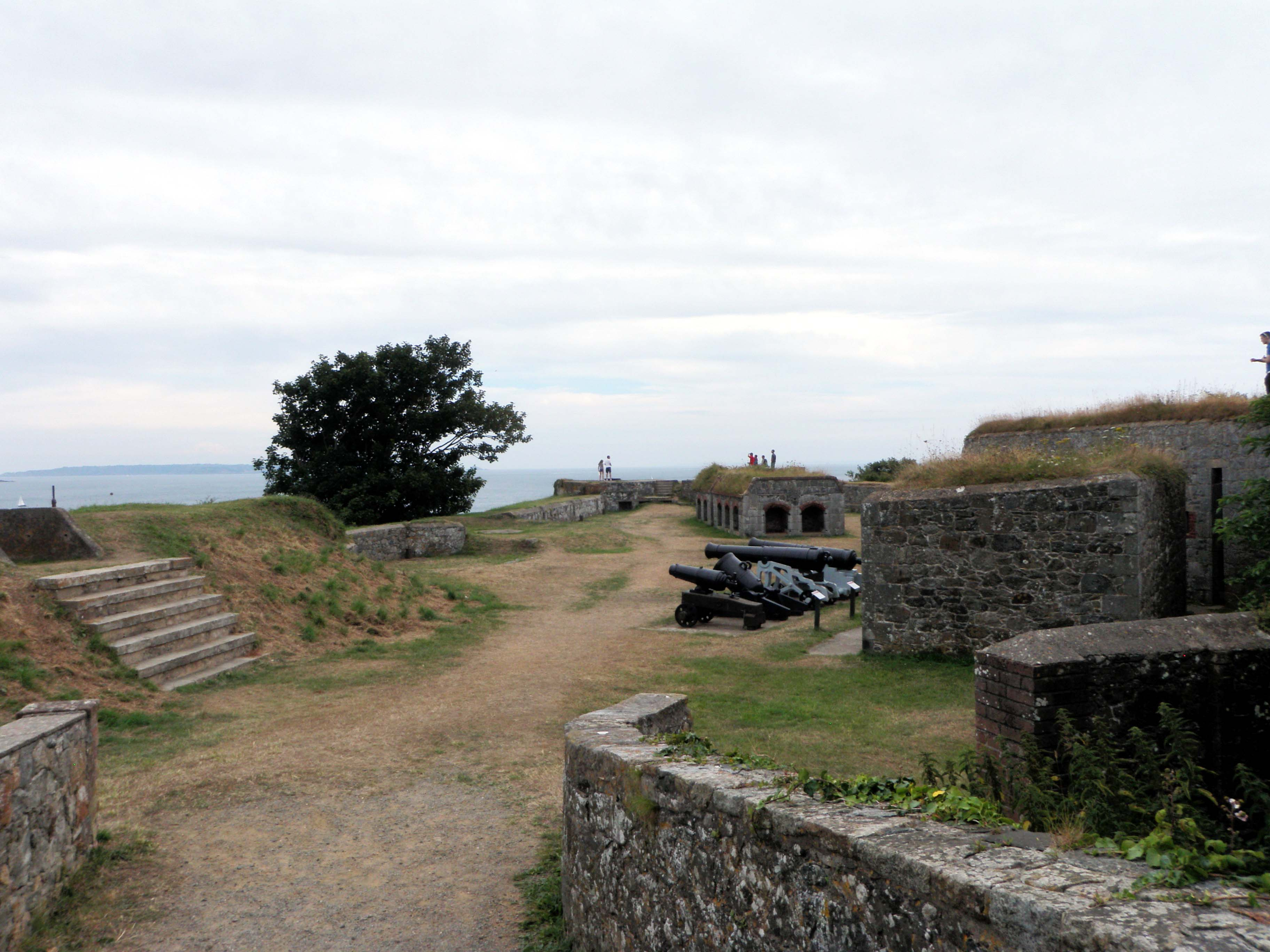
Clarence Battery at Fort George

=== Main gate ===
The main entrance is through an imposing gateway that still houses the original wooden gates. Behind the gate would have been a moat and drawbridge which would have provided a second line of defence.

A plaque over the gate is addressed to Maj-Gen. Sir John Doyle Bt, GCB, KC, Lieutenant Governor of Guernsey from 1803 to 1816 and Commanding Officer in 1812.

=== Armaments ===
In 1833 the fort mounted 34 cannons, one carronade, and four mortars. Support came from several nearby strong batteries. The armoury contained pikes, muskets, and swords.

=== Clarence battery ===
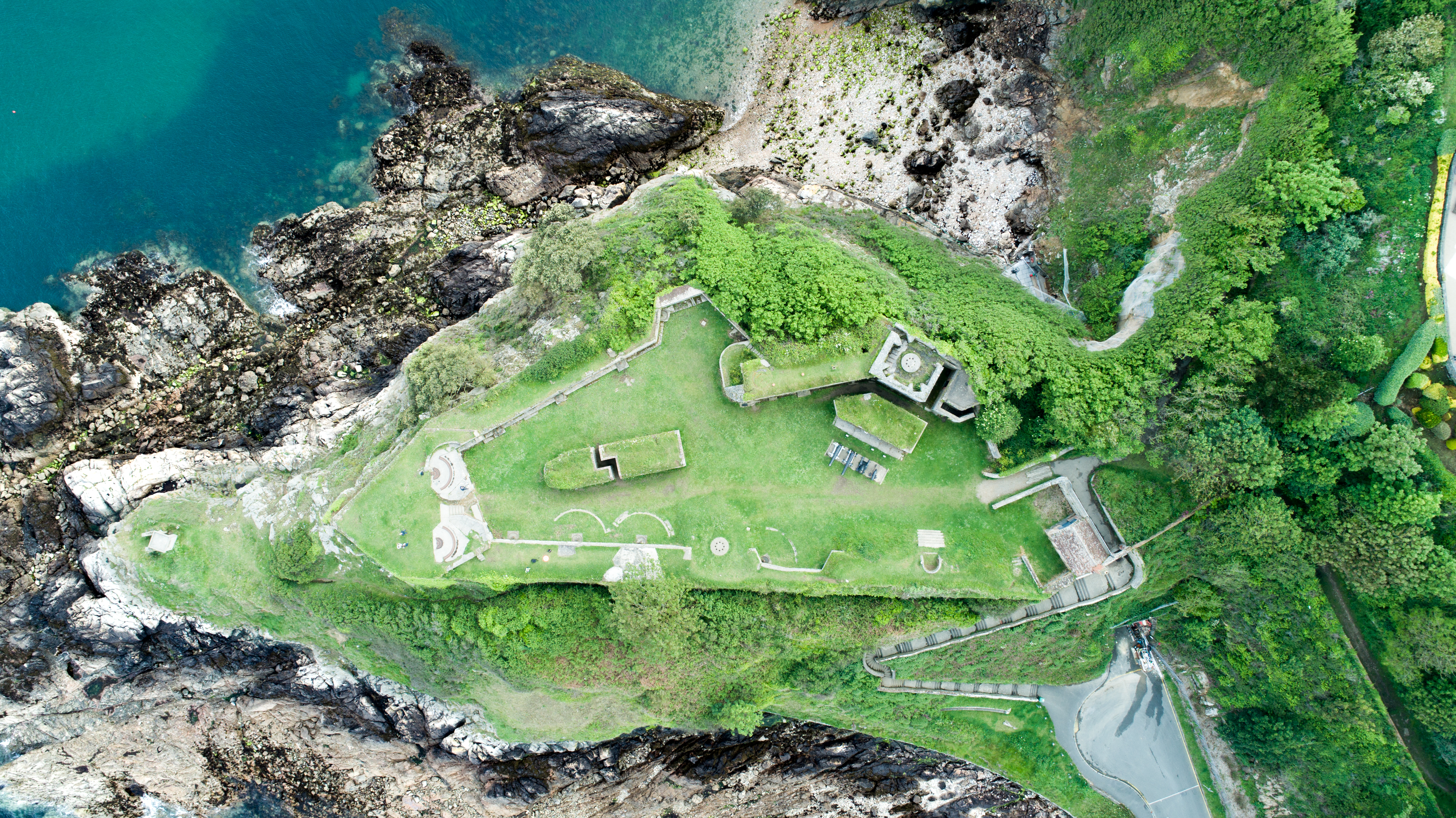
Aerial view of the battery in 2017

Originally called Terres Point Battery when it was built in 1780, it was renamed in 1815 in honour of the third son, Prince William, Duke of Clarence of King George III. Ten gun mountings allowed the battery to fire in two directions, a magazine and Guard Room was also built. The original guns were later replaced with 2x 5-inch guns on Vavasseur mountings at the tip of the battery. During the occupation, a triple 3.7cm flak battery was installed along with machine guns and a 60cm searchlight.

=== Cemetery ===
A military cemetery was created and housing graves of British soldiers and sailors from the 19th and 20th-centuries. It is also the final resting place of 111 German soldiers and sailors. The cemetery is War Department property and contains war graves of both world wars. The Commonwealth War Graves Commission lists all 136 military graves in the cemetery, irrespective of nationality.

A register of Baptisms and Burials was maintained by the Garrison Chaplain at Fort George between 1794 and 1810 and is held in the island archives. The Register can be consulted at the Priaulx Library.

== Access and current use ==
Access to the site is possible although much of the land is now in private hands. The majority of the minor buildings were demolished and the remainder has been incorporated into houses. The original main gate is complete and provides vehicle access to the estate. There are car parks at the bottom of the Belvedere field and the cemetery.

From the Valette bathing places, one can walk along to the aquarium, which is built inside a tunnel under the fort, and climb the steps up to the Clarence battery, from where one can access the fort and the cemetery. UPDATE 2020 - the steps are currently closed due to landslip and the paths from the south or bottom of Val Des Terres / Postern gate should be used instead. UPDATE 2025 - The steps have since been re-opened.

The main road leading from St Peter Port to the fort is Le Val des Terres which was opened in 1935 by Le Prince de Galles. Before that, the approach was via George Road.

== See also ==
- Fortifications of Guernsey
