= Lowther baronets of Swillington (second creation, 1824) =

Baronetcy

Escutcheon of the Lowther baronets of Swillington (1824)

The Lowther baronetcy, of Swillington in the County of York, was created in the Baronetage of the United Kingdom on 3 November 1824 for John Lowther. He was the second son of Sir William Lowther, 1st Baronet, of Little Preston, and brother of William Lowther, 1st Earl of Lonsdale (1807). His seat was Wilton Castle.

The 2nd Baronet sat as a Member of Parliament, initially for Cockermouth. The present holder of the baronetcy is also in remainder to the Baronetcy of Little Preston and in special remainder to the barony and viscountcy of Lowther, titles held by his kinsman the Earl of Lonsdale.

== Lowther baronets, of Swillington (1824) ==
- Sir John Lowther, 1st Baronet (1759–1844)
- Sir John Henry Lowther, 2nd Baronet (1793–1868)
- Sir Charles Hugh Lowther, 3rd Baronet (1803–1894)
- Sir Charles Bingham Lowther, CB, DSO, 4th Baronet (1880–1949)
- Sir William Guy Lowther, OBE, 5th Baronet (1912–1982)
- Sir Charles Douglas Lowther, 6th Baronet (1946–2018)
- Sir Patrick William Lowther, 7th Baronet (born 1977), educated at Radley College followed by Durham University (BA Politics, 1999) and Cass Business School (MA Real Estate, 2004), at Assura plc to 2023.

The heir apparent is the present holder's son Hugo Charles Sandy Lowther (born 2008).

== Notes ==
Baronetage of the United Kingdom
Preceded by Ochterlony baronets	Lowther baronets of Swillington; 3 November 1824	Succeeded by Munro baronets
