= Guernsey loophole towers =

Series of fortifications in Guernsey

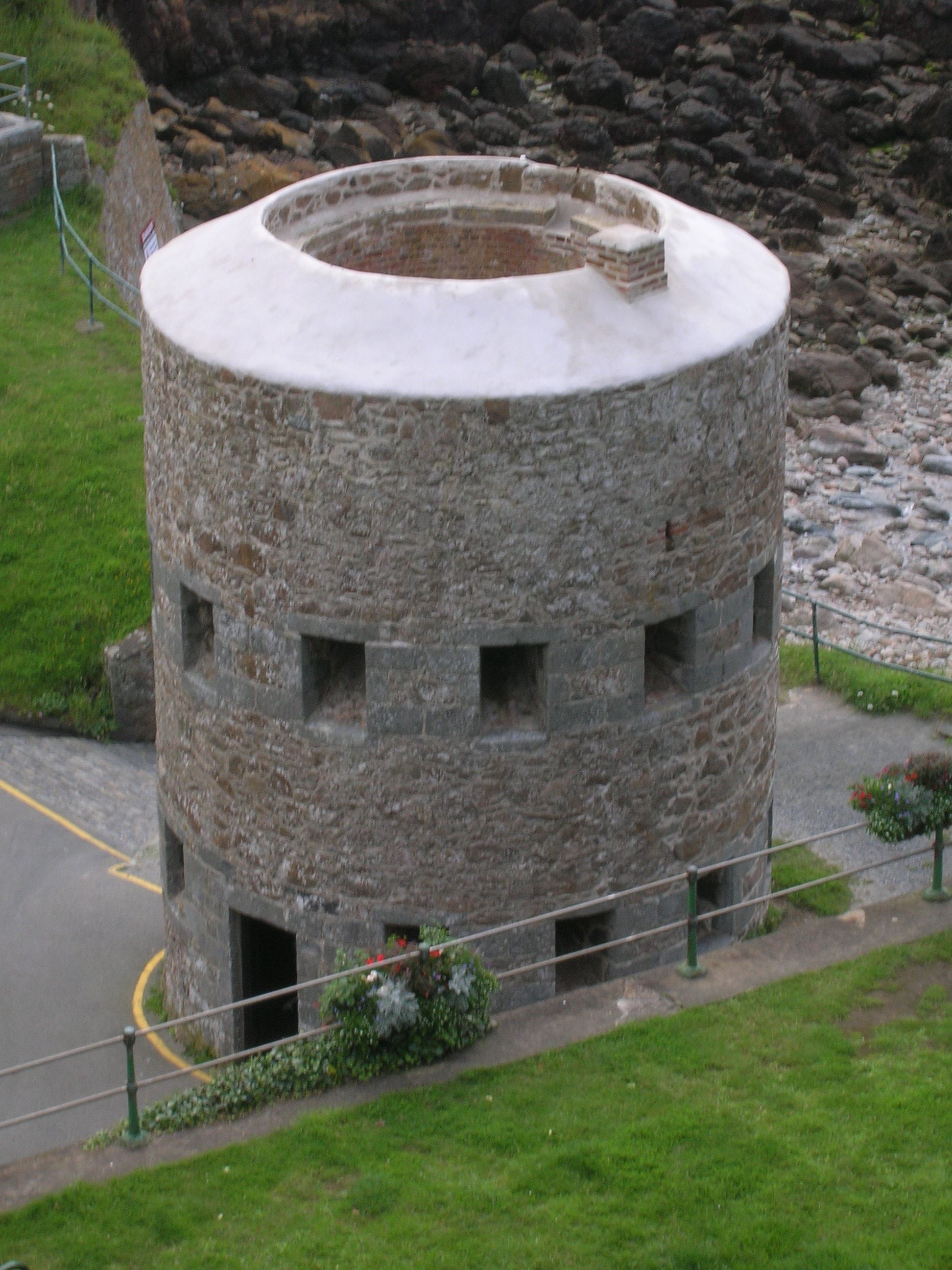
Petit Bôt tower seen from above

The British built 15 Guernsey loophole towers at various points along the coast of Guernsey between August 1778 and March 1779, to deter possible French attacks after France had declared itself an ally of the Americans in the American Revolutionary War. Towards the start of the Napoleonic Wars, several towers received additional reinforcement in the form of batteries at their bases. Today, 12 towers still survive, three having been destroyed at different times.

== History ==
In 1778, General Henry Seymour Conway, Governor of Jersey, recommended that 30 towers (see Jersey Round Tower) be built there to impede a possible French incursion. As it happened, almost all the towers were built after the Battle of Jersey in 1781. However, in July 1778, the British government also authorized the building of 15 towers on Guernsey. These towers were designed to accommodate only muskets (i.e., there was no provision for artillery); though there was discussion of giving each tower a Coehorn mortar for the roof platform, nothing came of this.

Although most of the towers were built on the Commons, or on public land above the high-water mark, three towers were to be built on private land. The States were of the opinion that the project was of such importance that if necessary they would exercise eminent domain, "...notwithstanding any Clameur de haro or any opposition whatsoever...".

Manning the towers was the responsibility of the Royal Guernsey Militia. This force of 4-5,000 men consisted of a field artillery regiment and four infantry regiments. Service in the militia was compulsory and unpaid. The men took turns manning the towers and other fortifications assigned to each regiment.

A report of 1787, pointed out the towers' limitations. As a result, at the onset of the Napoleonic Wars, and during General Sir John Doyle's tenure as Lieutenant Governor (1803-1816), a number of the towers received supporting batteries, either at their base, or nearby. Also, in 1803, the towers had their roofs strengthened and they received 12-pounder carronades as additional armament.

During the German occupation of the Channel Islands during World War II, the Germans modified some towers to their purposes, generally by replacing some of the loopholes with machine-gun slits. The Petit Bôt Tower provided one example; however, its recent restoration returned it to its pre-World War II form.

The tower at Fermain has since become a holiday home owned by the National Trust of Guernsey.

== Design and construction ==
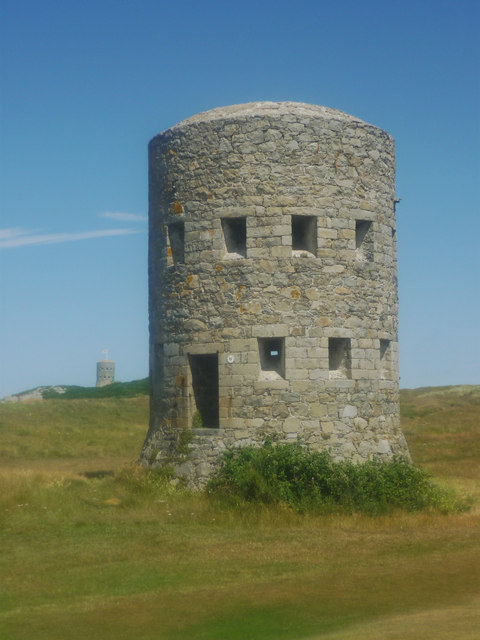
L'Ancresse Loophole Tower no. 6

The towers were all built to one design. They all had three floors, the two above the ground floor having loopholes that would permit musket fire to cover all approaches to the tower. Captain Frederick Bassett, RE, the Commanding Engineer in the Channel Islands, oversaw the towers' construction. They were to be built to the design of the Jersey round towers, but in fact deviated in a number of ways. They had a batter (slope) at the base, and were slenderer than the Jersey towers. The Jersey towers also later received machicolations, which are absent from the Guernsey loophole towers.

=== Dimensions ===
The towers are 30 ft (9 m) tall, and have an external diameter of 20 ft (6 m) and an internal diameter of just over 12 ft (3.7 m). They have a batter to the walls to the first floor, and then rise straight up from there.

=== Material ===
The towers were built of Guernsey granites. Tower #1, at Houge à la Perre Battery, on Belle Greve Bay, St Peter Port, was built of St Peter Port gabbro. All the others were built of local granite, with Vazon being built of Cobo Granite (Adamellite).

== The towers ==
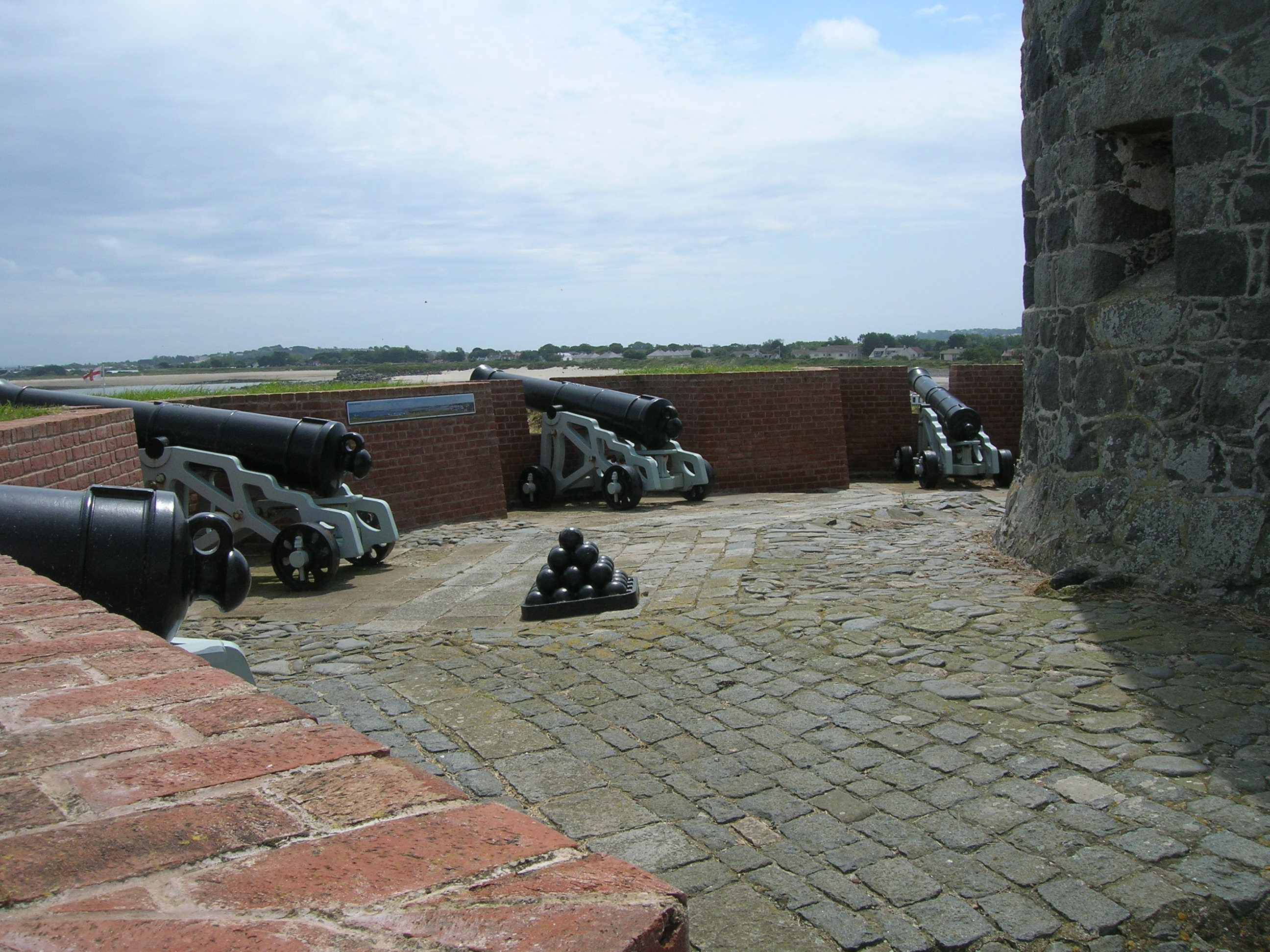
The battery at Rousse tower

The towers are numbered sequentially, in a counter-clockwise direction from St Peter Port.

1. - Hougue à la Perre Tower and battery, St Sampson. Destroyed 2 July 1905 for a tram shed and road widening. A German bunker now occupies the site.
2. - Hougue à la Perre Tower (Belle Greve), Saint Sampson. Destroyed in 1958 for States flats.
3. - Mont Crevelt Tower and battery, St Sampson.
4. - By Fort Le Marchant, Vale.
5. - L’Ancresse Bay, Nid de l'Herbe, Vale.
6. - L’Ancresse Common, Vale. The Common now holds a golf course, on which the tower stands.
7. - L'Ancresse Common, Vale, on the golf course.
8. - L'Ancresse Common, Vale, on the golf course. Destroyed by the Germans during World War II.
9. - Bay de la Jaonneuse, Vale. The tower now has a slight lean.
10. - Chouet, Vale. The Chouet and Rousse towers stand on the headlands that cover the entrance to Grand Havre Bay. Up until the early 19th Century, the bay led to the Braye du Valle, a saltwater channel that extended to St Sampson's Harbour, and that made the northern extremity of Guernsey, Le Clos du Valle, a tidal island.
11. - Rousse Tower and battery, Vale. The battery of three 24-pounder and two 9-pounder guns was added in 1804. The tower has three levels and one can climb to the top, which provides a good view along the coast. In the tower, life-size models show how members of the Guernsey militia, and their families, manned the defenses. The nearby magazine has additional displays.
12. - Vazon Road, Castel. There is a magazine and battery located nearby. The battery would have mounted four 24-pounder guns in 1816.
13. - Petit Bôt Tower, Forest - The tower was placed at Petit Bot because Petit Bot has a sandy beach, making it one of the few potential landing places on the south coast of the island. The tower was renovated between 2011 and 2012 and the information centre on the ground floor opened in June 2012.
14. - Saints Bay, St Martin
15. - Fermain Tower and battery, St Martin. Fermain North Battery and its magazine stand near the tower.
