= History of Guernsey =

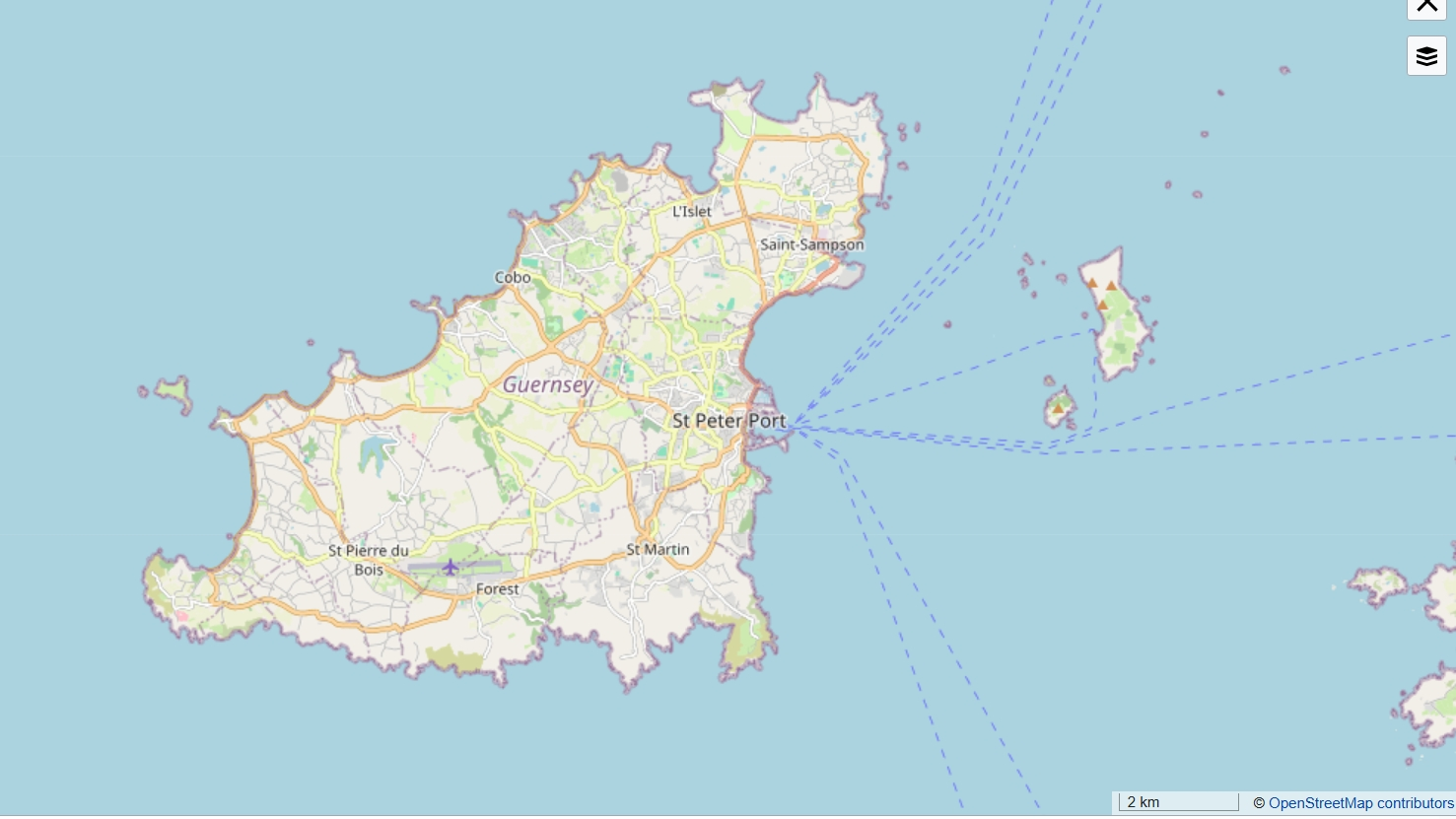
Map of Guernsey

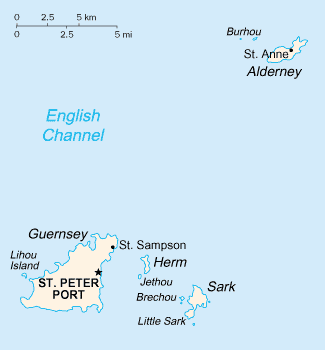
Guernsey within the Bailiwick of Guernsey

The history of Guernsey dates to prehistoric times, with evidence of Neolithic occupation and later Roman occupation. Tradition credits Saint Sampson with introducing Christianity to the island.

Guernsey became part of the Duchy of Normandy and remained under the rule of William the Conqueror after he became king of England. In subsequent centuries, warfare and attacks by pirates and naval forces disrupted trade and prompted the construction of fortifications and the establishment of the Guernsey militia. After mainland Normandy came under French control in the thirteenth century, Guernsey remained under the English Crown.

During the English Civil War, most of Guernsey supported the Parliamentarians, while the garrison of Castle Cornet supported the Royalists. Privateering and maritime trade contributed to the island's prosperity during the Napoleonic Wars. Quarrying, horticulture, and tourism subsequently became important industries, while English gradually displaced Guernésiais as the principal language.

Guernsey was occupied by German troops during the Second World War. In the post-war period, its economy was rebuilt around tourism, agriculture and trade, followed by the growth of the finance industry.

== Prehistory ==
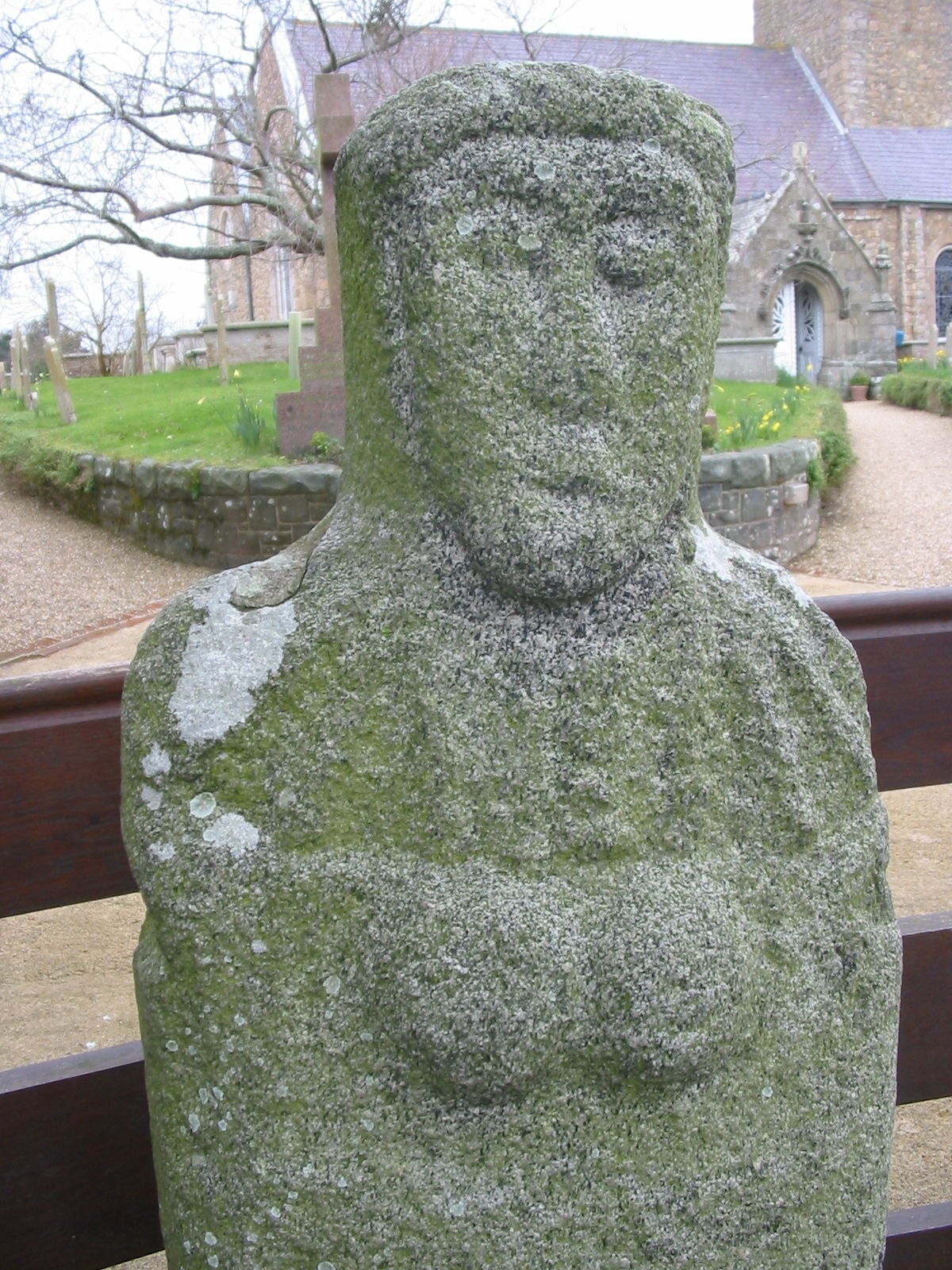
La Gran'mère du Chimquière ("the Grandmother of Chimquière"), a prehistoric statue menhir at the entrance to Saint Martin's Church

Around 6000 BC, rising sea levels separated Guernsey from continental Europe as the English Channel formed. Neolithic farmers subsequently settled on the island and constructed dolmens and menhirs. Guernsey has two carved statue menhirs, while the dolmen known as L'Autel du Dehus contains a carved dolmen deity called Le Gardien du Tombeau.

Archaeological evidence indicates that Guernsey participated in regional trade during the Roman period. A third-century Gallo-Roman shipwreck was discovered in St Peter Port harbour. Excavations at Kings Road in St Peter Port uncovered silver from England, Breton pottery and wine amphorae, indicating maritime trade along the western coast of Europe.

== Early history ==
=== The arrival of Christianity ===
During their migration to Brittany, Britons settled in the Lenur islands, an early name for the Channel Islands. Historical sources variously identified Guernsey as Sarnia or Lisia, although later research has suggested that Sarnia may instead have referred to Sark. Sarnia nevertheless remains a traditional designation for Guernsey. Medieval records also used spellings including Gernesey, Gernesie and Gernezeye.

Tradition credits Saint Samson, who travelled from the Kingdom of Gwent and later became abbot of Dol in Brittany, with introducing Christianity to Guernsey.

A chapel, dedicated to Saint Magloire once stood in the Vale. Magloire, traditionally described as a nephew of Samson, was born around 535. A papal bull issued by Pope Adrian IV recorded the chapel as being under the patronage of Mont-Saint-Michel Abbey in Normandy, although no trace of the building survives. According to tradition, Magloire established a place of Christian worship in Guernsey before 600, but the chapel itself was probably built later.

In the late tenth century, Benedictine monks from Mont-Saint-Michel founded a priory dedicated to Saint Michael the Archangel at St Michel du Valle in northern Guernsey. Sources variously date its foundation to c. 962–968. The priory remained dependent on the abbey, and its former estates became known as the Fief Saint-Michel. Northern Guernsey was separated from the rest of the island at high tide until nineteenth-century land reclamation. The priory was distinct from the later Lihou Priory.

=== The Duchy of Normandy ===
In 933, Guernsey and the other Channel Islands came under the control of William Longsword, the son and successor of Rollo. The islands formed part of territories annexed from the Duchy of Brittany and incorporated into the Duchy of Normandy. Guernsey and the other Channel Islands are remnants of the medieval Duchy of Normandy and retain a constitutional relationship with the British Crown.

In 1020, Duke Richard II split Guernsey in half, between the viscounts of the Cotentin and the viscounts of Bessin. However, when one of the former's ancestor died heirless in around 1137, the fief reverted to the Duke, hence why it is named Fief le Roi (the King's fief).

According to tradition, Robert I, Duke of Normandy (the father of William the Conqueror) was journeying to England in 1032, to help Edward the Confessor. He was obliged to take shelter in Guernsey and gave land, now known as the Clos du Valle, to the monks. Furthermore, in 1061, when pirates attacked and pillaged the Island, a complaint was made to Duke William. He sent over Sampson D'Anneville, who succeeded, with the aid of the monks, in driving the pirates out. For this service, Sampson D' Anneville and the monks were rewarded with a grant of half the Island between them. The portion that went to the monastery was known as Le Fief St Michel, and included the parishes of St Saviour, St Pierre du Bois, Ste. Marie du Catel, and the Vale. The part of Sampson was called fief of Anneville. Another version says that Sampson followed Duke William and fought Neel de Saint Saveur Nigel de Saint-Sauveur, who held the fief of de Bessin in Guernsey. The rebels were eventually defeated at the decisive Battle of Val-ès-Dunes (1047) and on this occasion Nèel, Viscount of Cotentin, fled to Brittany and forfeited his fief in Guernsey. This battle is described by Wace in his poem "Roman du Rou". In any case, in this version too, Sampson d'Anneville stands at the beginning of the actual feudal settlement of the island. Sampson built a manor house called Manor d'Anneville and had two sons. The founding of the Seigneurie and fief d'Anneville in one quarter of the island, followed by the settlement of various Norman lords, means that feudal settlement and organisation of the island had already taken place before the Conquest. This tradition, of course, underlines the special character of Guernsey. It is echoed by many historians. Other historians, such as James Marr, suggest that this second phase of development was longer and continued after the death of William in 1087 and the rise of Geoffrey of Anjou.

In 1066, the Duke William the Conqueror defeated Harold Godwinson at Hastings to become the King of England; however, he continued to rule his French possessions, including Guernsey, as a separate entity, as fealty was owed to the King of France. This initial association of Guernsey with England did not last long, as William split his possessions between his sons: Robert Curthose became Duke of Normandy and William Rufus gained the English Crown. William Rufus' brother Henry I recaptured Normandy for England in 1106. The island was then part of the English King's realm (though still part of Normandy and France). Around 1142, it is recorded that Guernsey was under the control of the Count of Anjou, who administered Normandy for the Duke.

=== Late Middle Ages ===
The loss of Normandy by King John in 1204 isolated the Channel Islands from mainland Europe.

The loss of mainland Normandy by King John in 1204 was the defining event in Guernsey's constitutional history. The separation was not automatic: Norman seigneurs across the Duchy were compelled to choose their allegiance, and many sided with whichever power brought them the greatest advantage. Pierre de Préaux, Lord of the Islands since 1200, fought for King John against France but was defeated at Rouen; with his surrender on 24 June 1204, his lordship of the Channel Islands technically passed to France. For a brief period the islands belonged to neither the English Crown nor the conquered Duchy.

The subsequent decision of the island's seigneurs to confirm their allegiance to the English Crown—rather than follow the continental Duchy under France—was the foundational act of the islands' separate constitutional existence. King John responded by promising the islands the right to continue governing themselves according to their own laws and customs, privileges traditionally attributed to the so-called Constitutions of King John. The islands were never incorporated into the Kingdom of England through any Act of Union, but remained self-governing peculiars of the Crown.

In 1259, the Treaty of Paris formalised the arrangement: Henry III renounced his claim to the Duchy of Normandy while retaining the Channel Islands, which were confirmed as possessions of the Crown held separately from the Kingdom of England. The Bailiwick of Guernsey has since maintained an unwritten constitution deriving from this settlement, with the Sovereign holding the islands as successor to the Dukes of Normandy.

This constitutional separation also preserved the island's distinct legal identity. Over the following centuries, Guernsey defended its right to be governed by the Coutume de Normandie (the customary law of Normandy) rather than English common law, notably during the plaids of Quo warranto in the late 13th and early 14th centuries. The right to Norman customary law, the direct feudal relationship with the Crown, and the islands' self-governing institutions form the basis of Guernsey's continuing status as a Crown Dependency—self-governing but not part of the United Kingdom.

The feudal heritage rooted in the seigneurs' act of allegiance in 1204 continues to be maintained as a distinctive element of Guernsey's constitutional and cultural identity. In the absence of a written constitution, the continuing observance of Norman feudal customs serves as tangible evidence of the islands' separate status and their direct relationship with the Crown. The Court of Chief Pleas—the ancient court originally composed of the Bailiff, Jurats, and seigneurs holding fiefs directly from the Crown—continues to sit annually, with seigneurs of the fiefs nobles still required by the Court of Chief Pleas (Guernsey) Law, 2004 to perform Suit of Court (Secta Curiae). The ceremony of homage and reinvestiture, in which seigneurs reaffirm their vassalage to the Sovereign as Duke of Normandy — re-enacting the original act of allegiance that founded the islands' constitutional autonomy — remains the only feudal ceremony of its kind still practised in the world today.

Each time England and France went to war over the coming centuries, trade to and from the Channel Islands was restricted or banned and even when not officially at war, the island was repeatedly attacked by continental pirates and naval forces.

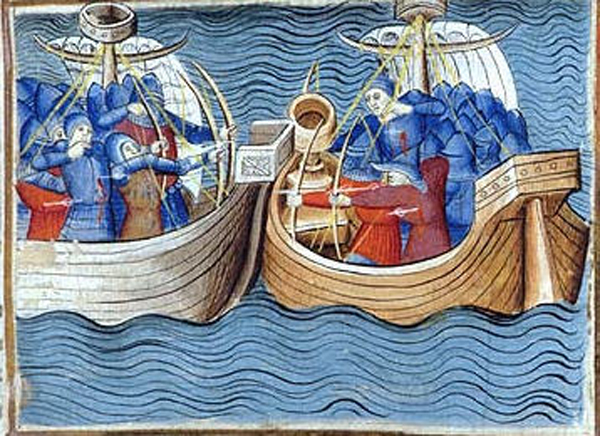
Battle 1342

Fortifications were improved in the Channel Islands, manned by professional soldiers and the Guernsey militia who would help to defend the Island for the next 600 years. Service was compulsory in the militia for every man in the Island. Raids on Guernsey in 1336 and 1337 by exiled David Bruce, came at the start of the Hundred Years War, they were followed by Sark being captured and using this as a base, the next year when, starting in 1339, Guernsey was occupied by the Capetians, holding the Island for two years and Castle Cornet for seven. The attacks would recur on several occasions.

It was 1348 when the Black Death reached the Island, ravaging the population. In 1372, the island was invaded by Aragonese mercenaries under the command of Owain Lawgoch (remembered as Yvon de Galles), who was in the pay of the French king. Lawgoch and his dark-haired mercenaries were later absorbed into Guernsey legend as an invasion by fairies from across the sea.

In 1394 Richard II of England granted a new Charter to the islands. Because of great loyalty shown to the Crown, they were exempted for ever from English tolls, customs and duties.

Shipbuilding skills improved and trade to and from Guernsey increased with a growing number of ports, sometimes using trading treaties and sometimes avoiding paying duties. Guernsey ships in the 14th century were small. 12-80 tons with crews of 8-20 men. In times of war, ships could be seized as prizes, the practice continuing in times of peace, against all nationalities, as piracy.

In 1441, Guernsey's liberties, customs and usages were set out in Le Précepte d'Assise.

=== The Reformation ===
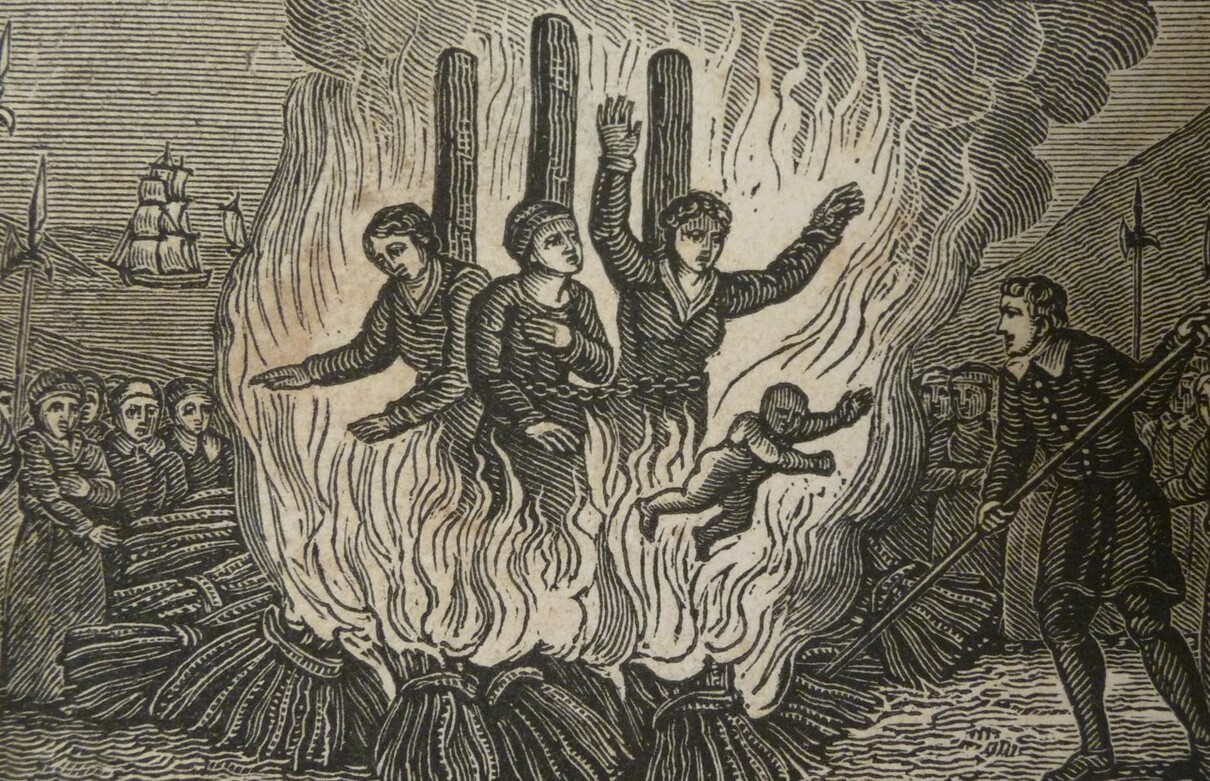
The burning of the Guernsey Martyrs 1556

In the mid-16th century, the island was influenced by Calvinist reformers from Normandy. During the Marian persecutions, three local women, the Guernsey Martyrs, were burned at the stake in 1556 for their Protestant beliefs. Two years later Elizabeth I came to the throne and Catholicism faded in Guernsey.

The French and piracy were problems to trade with Guernsey in the 16th century, requiring English naval ships to keep them at bay. Guernsey and Jersey were given certain privileges as the English crown needed the Islands to be loyal, not least of which was the Islands neutrality, allowing trade to be pursued with France and England, even when these were at war. The trade creating revenue from taxes to pay for the Island garrisons.

== Early modern history ==
=== Civil War ===
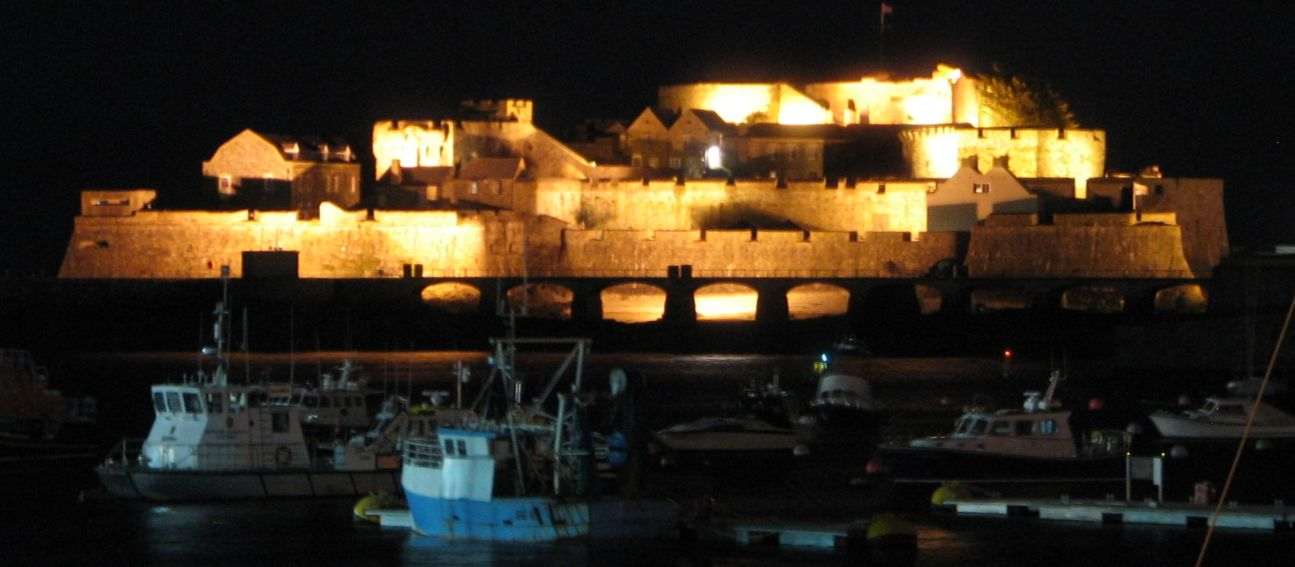
Castle Cornet seen at night over the harbour of St Peter Port.

During the English Civil War, Guernsey sided with the Parliamentarians, while Jersey remained Royalist. Guernsey's decision was mainly related to the higher proportion of Calvinists and other Reformed churches, as well as Charles I's refusal to invest in the defences of the island. The allegiance was not total, however; there were a few Royalist uprisings in the southwest of the island, while Castle Cornet was occupied by the Governor, Sir Peter Osborne, and Royalist troops. Castle Cornet, which had been built to protect Guernsey, was turned on by the town of St. Peter Port, who constantly bombarded it. It was the penultimate Royalist stronghold to capitulate (in 1651)

=== 17th and 18th trade and emigration ===
The Newfoundland cod trade was important to Guernsey until around 1700 when the small Guernsey ships found that the smuggling trade could prove more profitable, with Island businesses established to buy in goods for sale to smugglers until smuggling declined at the end of the 18th century, when legal privateering took over as the most profitable business.

Wars against France and Spain during the 17th and 18th centuries gave Guernsey shipowners and sea captains the opportunity to exploit the island's proximity to mainland Europe by applying for Letters of Marque and turning their merchantmen into licensed privateers. It was very profitable. In the first ten years of 18th century, the War of the Spanish Succession, 608 prizes were taken by Guernsey privateers. there was however a downside with about 50 ships being lost. To spread the risk, people would buy a share in a ship, (1/8 for instance) receiving a portion of prize monies after costs, if successful. Many Islanders became rich without ever setting foot on a sailing vessel. Ships became larger, with more crew and were better armed as more money was invested. Late in the 18th century, during the American Revolutionary War which lasted for 8 years, Guernsey and Alderney privateers took 221 prizes worth £981,300 (in today's terms, about £100m). The Islands and Guernsey in particular provided an important element to the blockading of enemies of Britain.

During the late 17th century the grant by Charles II of England of an island to George Carteret the Bailiff of Jersey, which was renamed New Jersey, combined with the Channel Island trading ships visiting New England saw Islanders setting up businesses and settling overseas. By the beginning of the 18th century, Guernsey's residents were starting to settle in North America. Guernsey County was founded in Ohio in 1810.

Ordinary trade continued, fishing had always been an important business. Knitting was an important home industry, overseas shipping carrying such diverse goods as wood, sugar, rum, coal, tobacco, salt, textiles, finished goods, glass, emigrants and wine. Trading mainly with Europe, the West Indies and the Americas.

== 19th century ==
Privateering during the Napoleonic Wars generated more profits, rolling on from the French Revolutionary Wars. London issued 5,632 letters of Marque of which Guernsey captains received 602, amongst around 70 ships varying in size from 5 to 500 ton. The Letter of Marque would set out which countries' ships could be taken, by which ship, owned by which people. Ships also became stronger and better armed. The war saw the introduction of a series of UK Privateer Acts, to set out rules of valuation of prizes to reduce disputes in Court.

Fort George was a former garrison for the British Army. Construction started in 1780, and was completed in 1812. It was built to accommodate the increase in the number of troops stationed in the island in anticipation of a French invasion during the Napoleonic Wars. Le Braye du Valle was a tidal channel that made the northern extremity of Guernsey, Le Clos du Valle, a tidal island. Le Braye du Valle was drained and reclaimed in 1806 by the British Government as a defence measure. The eastern end of the former channel became the town and harbour (from 1820) of St. Sampson's, now the second biggest port in Guernsey. The western end of La Braye is now Le Grand Havre. The roadway called "The Bridge" across the end of the harbour at St. Sampson's recalls the bridge that formerly linked the two parts of Guernsey at high tide. New roads were built and main roads metalled for ease of use by the military.

In 1813, the States requested to the Privy Council permission to issue Guernsey coinage. The Council agreed on the condition it was struck at the Royal Mint. However, when the first coins were issued in 1830, they had not been minted at the Royal Mint, but by R. Boulton & Co. of Birmingham. It is likely for this reason that coins of the Guernsey pound did not traditionally feature the sovereign. French currency remained legal tender in Guernsey until 1921. Guernsey created money debt-free for building roads in 1815.

In 1821, the population of Guernsey was 20,302, 11,173 of whom were living in St. Peter Port. By 1901, the island population had doubled.

The 19th century saw a dramatic increase in prosperity of the island, due to its success in the global maritime trade, and the rise of the stone industry. Ships were travelling further to trade, one notable Guernseyman, William Le Lacheur, established the Costa Rican coffee trade with Europe and the Corbet Family who created the Fruit Export Company Shipbuilding also increased in the 1840-70 era, declining when iron ships were demanded.

The quarrying industry was an important employer in the 19th century, Guernsey granite was highly prized, with London Bridge and many important London roads being repaved in Guernsey granite, resulting in hundreds of quarries appearing in the northern parishes. Horticulture developed from the use of glasshouses for growing grapes to the growing of tomatoes, becoming a very important industry from the 1860s. Tourism during the Victorian era and the use of Guernsey as a refuge or retirement location brought money to the Island, Victor Hugo being one of the most distinguished refugees.

Light industry businesses would regularly appear and after a few decades would move on, such as the Dundee firm James Keiller, who set up in Guernsey in 1857 and lasting until 1879 to avoid the high taxes on sugar in the UK, with marmalade manufactured in Guernsey exported all over the world.

It was normal for the island to deport vagrants, criminals and anyone who had fallen on hard times who were not "local". Between 1842 and 1880, 10,000 people were deported. This included local-born widows and local-born children of "foreign" men and people who, whilst not born in Guernsey, had resided in Guernsey for over 50 years. This reduced the burden on the parish requirement to look after their poor and discouraged France, England and Ireland encouraging their poor to emigrate to Guernsey.

At the end of the century, long resisted, the time had arrived for change, to schools, where English would be taught as a language, to the government, including the use of English as a language in Court together with voting reform, and some changes to the unfair treatment of non-locals as regards their deportation if unwanted and their summary arrest and detention for petty debt offences, it being almost impossible for an immigrant to ever be recognised as a local, irrespective of their wealth and the number of decades residing in Guernsey.

== 20th century ==
=== World War I ===
During World War I, approximately 3,000 island men served in the British Expeditionary Force. Of these, about 1,000 served in the Royal Guernsey Light Infantry regiment formed from the Royal Guernsey Militia in 1916. In August 1917, Guernsey hosted an anti submarine French flying boat squadron, erecting hangars near Castle Cornet. The base is credited with having destroyed 25 German submarines. The Guernsey Roll of Honour includes 1,343 who were Bailiwick of Guernsey individuals or who served in the Royal Guernsey Light Infantry.

The economic depression in the 1930s also affected Guernsey. Unemployed labourers being given jobs such as building sea defences and constructing roads, including Le Val des Terres, opened in 1935 by Le Prince de Galles.

=== World War II ===
For most of World War II, the Bailiwick was occupied by German troops. Before the occupation, many Guernsey children had been evacuated to England to live with relatives or strangers during the war. Some children were never reunited with their families.

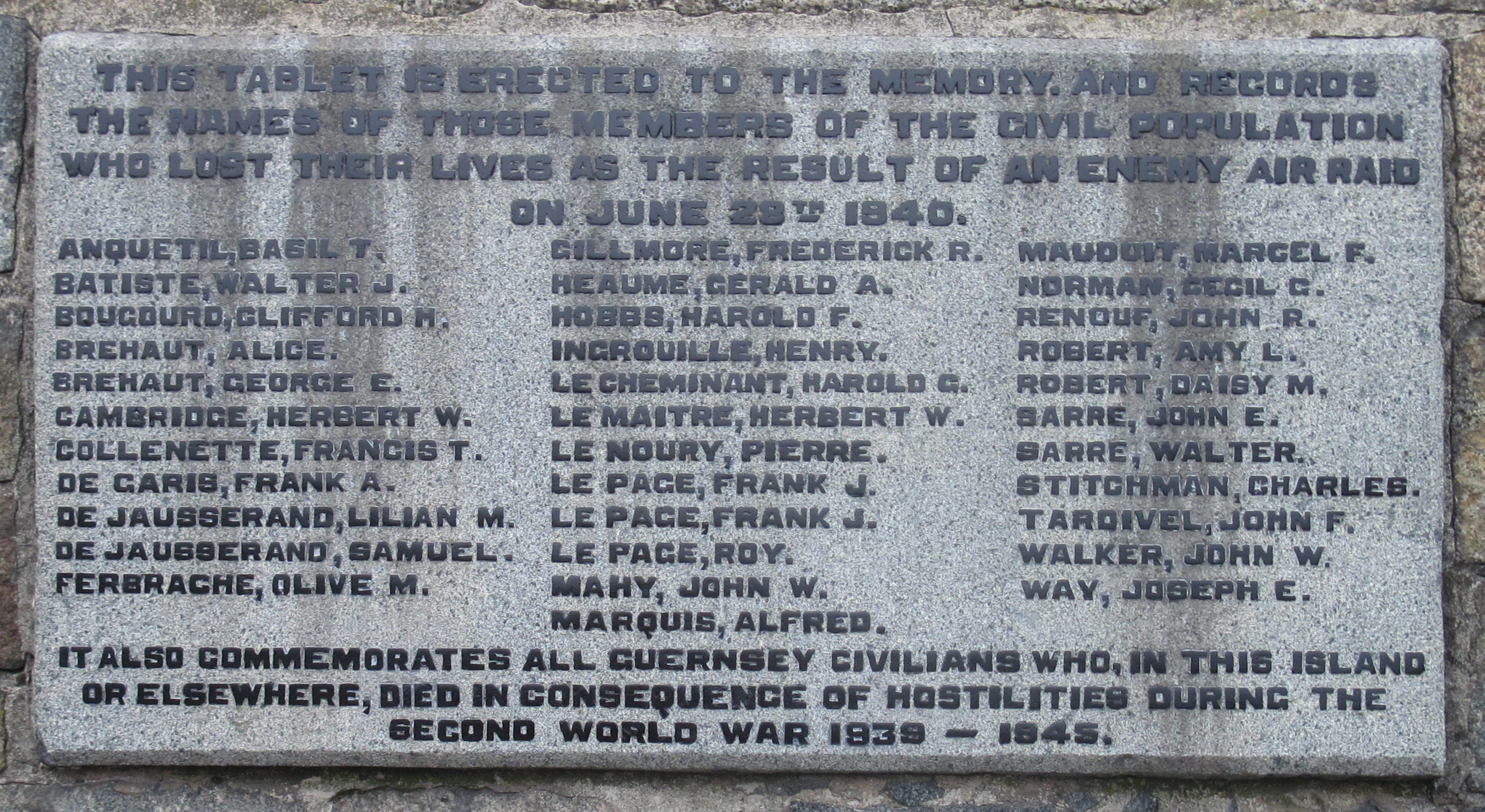
Plaque to the memory of Guernsey civilians killed, particularly in the 28 June 1940 bombing raid

The occupying German forces deported some of the Bailiwick's residents to camps in the southwest of Germany, notably to the Lager Lindele (Lindele Camp) near Biberach an der Riß. Among those deported was Ambrose (later Sir Ambrose) Sherwill, who, as the President of the States Controlling Committee, was de facto head of the civilian population. Sir Ambrose, who was Guernsey-born, had served in the British Army during the First World War and later became Bailiff of Guernsey. Three islanders of Jewish descent were deported to France and from there to Auschwitz where they were killed in The Holocaust. In Alderney, four camps were built to house forced labourers, mostly from Eastern Europe, two were handed for the SS to run. They were the only concentration camps run on British soil and are commemorated on memorials under Alderney's French name Aurigny.

Occupation laws were enforced by the German garrison. For example, rewards were offered to informants who reported anyone for painting "V-for Victory" signs on walls and buildings; a practice that had become popular among islanders wishing to express their loyalty to Britain.

Guernsey was very heavily fortified during World War II out of all proportion to the island's strategic value, for example four captured vintage Russian 305mm naval guns were installed at Batterie Mirus. German defences and alterations remain visible, including additions made to Castle Cornet and a windmill. Hitler had become obsessed with the idea that the Allies would try to regain the islands at any price, so over 20 per cent of the materials used to construct the "Atlantic Wall" (the Nazi attempt to defend continental Europe from seaborne invasion) was committed to the Channel Islands, including 47,000 cu m of concrete used for gun bases. Most of the German fortifications remain intact and although the majority of them stand on private property, several are open to the public.

Starvation threatened the Island in late 1944 after the German forces were cut off and supplies could not be brought in from France. The SS Vega, chartered by the Red Cross, brought Red Cross food parcels and other essential supplies into the Island.

The Island was liberated on 9 May 1945.

=== Post-war ===
After 1945 the Islanders had to rebuild their lives, the return of evacuees, especially children who could hardly remember their relatives. Many properties had been damaged through wood being stripped from them for fuel, the island had an enormous debt, tourism was destroyed and the growing industry was damaged. The amount of scrap metal collected is now regretted. Rationing continued as in the UK, until the mid-1950s.

Many traditional businesses, such as fishing and quarrying, would not return. So the Islanders looked to other opportunities, the physical import/export of goods was difficult as the harbours were too small and freight cost too expensive, so control of trade was looked at, the right to supply Mateus Rosé to the UK was controlled by a Guernsey business and it became the top selling wine in the world.

By the 1960s the island had recovered, tourism was important again, the horticulture industry was booming, 500 million tomatoes being exported annually, then came the crash. Cheap North Sea fuel allowed the Netherlands to provide cheap heating to their growers, the Guernsey industry was undercut on price, which combined with rising fuel prices saw the complete demise of the tomato industry after 100 years by the end of the 1970s. Restrictions were introduced to make it harder and more expensive for people to move to the island as there was a fear of a massive population increase.

During the 1970s and 1980s the island began to boom in the finance industry. Not an easy transition for people from the growing industry to an office environment. Profits and salaries were good and the Island had revenues to support long term capital expenditure plans. Continuing through the 1990s with divergence to related industries, such as captive insurance and fund management have managed to keep unemployment low. Tourism declined in the 1980s when the price of a holiday in Spain became much cheaper than coming to Guernsey, leaving the island aiming to attract the higher end of the market.

Light industry businesses had continued to appear and operate for a few decades in Guernsey including electronic (Tektronix from 1957 to the 1980s) and the current Specsavers which was established in 1984.

== See also ==
- Archaeology of the Channel Islands
- Fortifications of Guernsey
- Maritime history of the Channel Islands
