= Vavasour (disambiguation) =

Vavasour is a term for a feudal vassal or tenant of a baron.

Vavasour may also refer to:

- Vavasour (surname), a list of people so named
- Vavasour or Vavasor Powell (1617–1670), Welsh Nonconformist Puritan preacher, evangelist, church leader and writer
- Baron Vavasour, an abeyant title in the Peerage of England
- Vavasour baronets, three extinct titles in the Baronetage of England, one extinct and one extant title in the Baronetage of the United Kingdom
- Mount Vavasour, Banff National Park, Alberta, Canada

== See also ==
- Vavasseur, a surname
