= L'Ancresse =

L'Ancresse (lit. 'The Anchor') is an area in the Vale, Guernsey, comprising a common and several beaches covering 737 Vergées (298 acres).

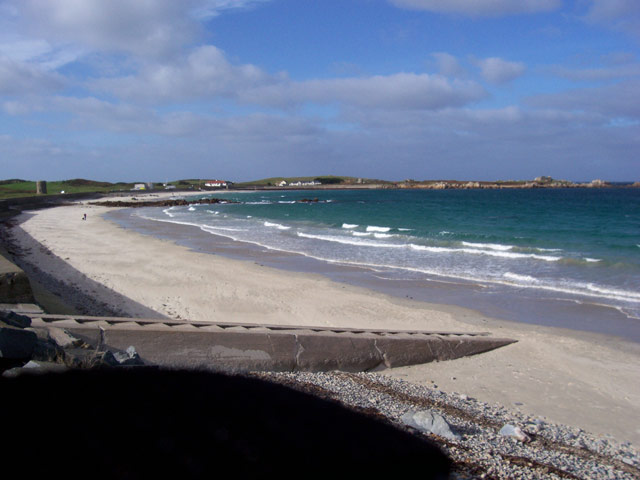
L'Ancresse Bay

== History ==
The sea levels having risen and stabilised around 9,400 BC leaving L’Ancresse looking similar to the current day situation with the sea to the north and west. Part of a tidal island, originally separated from the rest of Guernsey by the Braye du Valle, a tidal way that could be crossed at low tide.

L’Ancresse was the only part of the tidal island that did not form part of the Fief St Michel, the land granted to the Abbey of Mont Saint-Michel in the 10th century, it remained common land, belonging to the King. In the 1309 Assize Roll, a number of defendants were accused of encroaching upon the common land. The beaches at L’Ancresse comprise, Ladies Bay, Chouet, Jaonneuse, Pembroke and L’Ancresse.

=== Early history ===
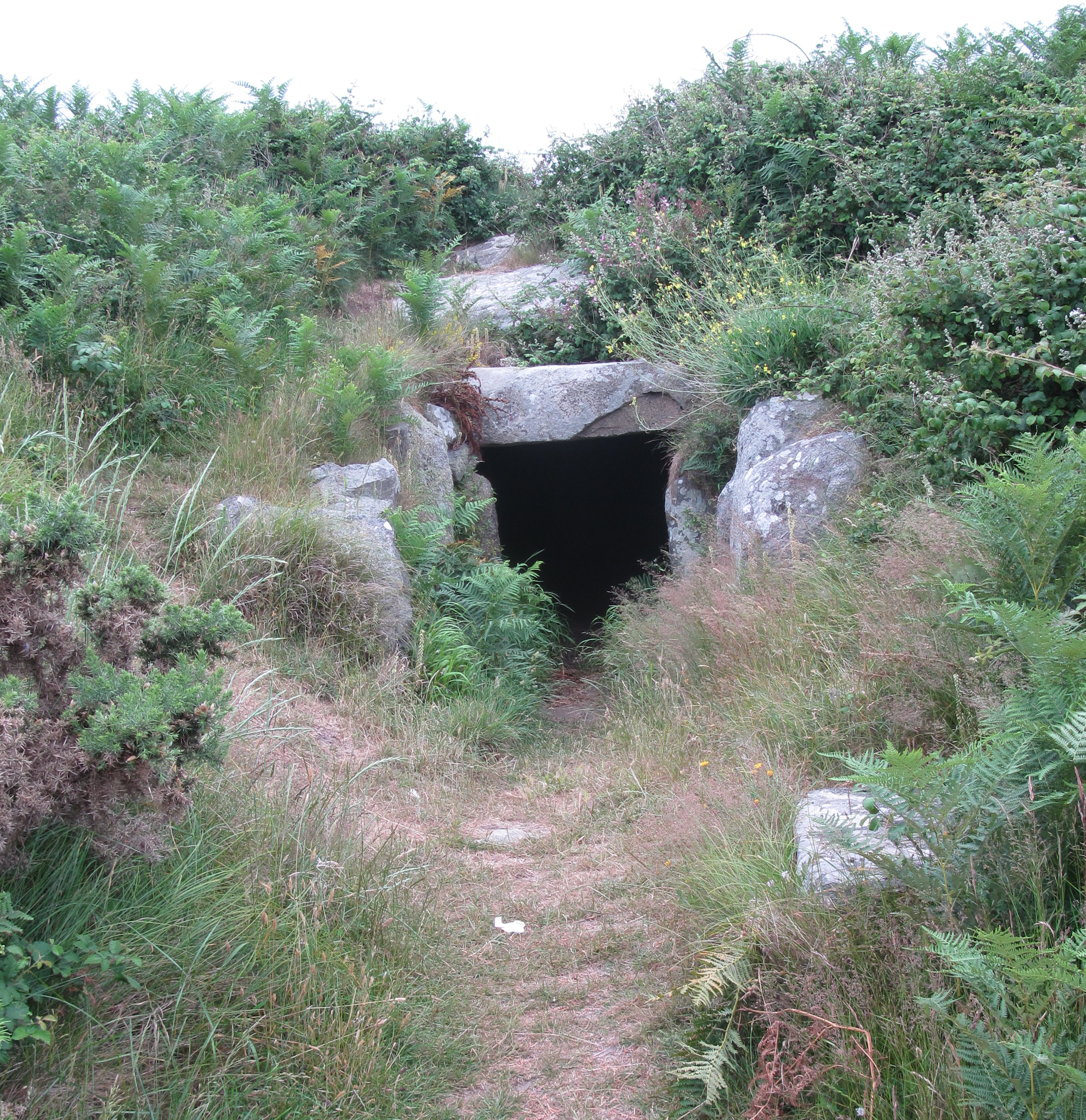
La Varde

The earliest evidence of human occupation comes from the Neolithic period 4,500 BC to 1,800 BC:

- Les Fouaillages – burial mound – 6,500 years old
- La Vardes – passage grave
- La Platte Mare – cist in circle with tomb art
- Rocque Balan – two bowl like features
- La Mare es Mauves – cist or stone circle

=== 7th to 17th century ===
The Vale Church is located to the south west of L’Ancresse and religious activity dates from the 7th century.

According to tradition, Robert II, Duke of Normandy (the father of William the Conqueror) was journeying to England in 1032, to help Edward the Confessor. He was obliged to take shelter in Guernsey in L’Ancresse Bay and in thanks for assistance, gave land now known as the Clos du Valle, to the monks.

Archery practice was undertaken on the common for centuries by the Guernsey Militia, limited defences were built, the main defence for the north of the island being the Vale Castle

=== 18th and 19th centuries ===
The threat of invasion from France resulted in the construction of seven Guernsey loophole towers at L’Ancresse, numbered 4 to 10, the towers originally being manned by the Royal Guernsey Militia. Other forts and batteries were also erected:

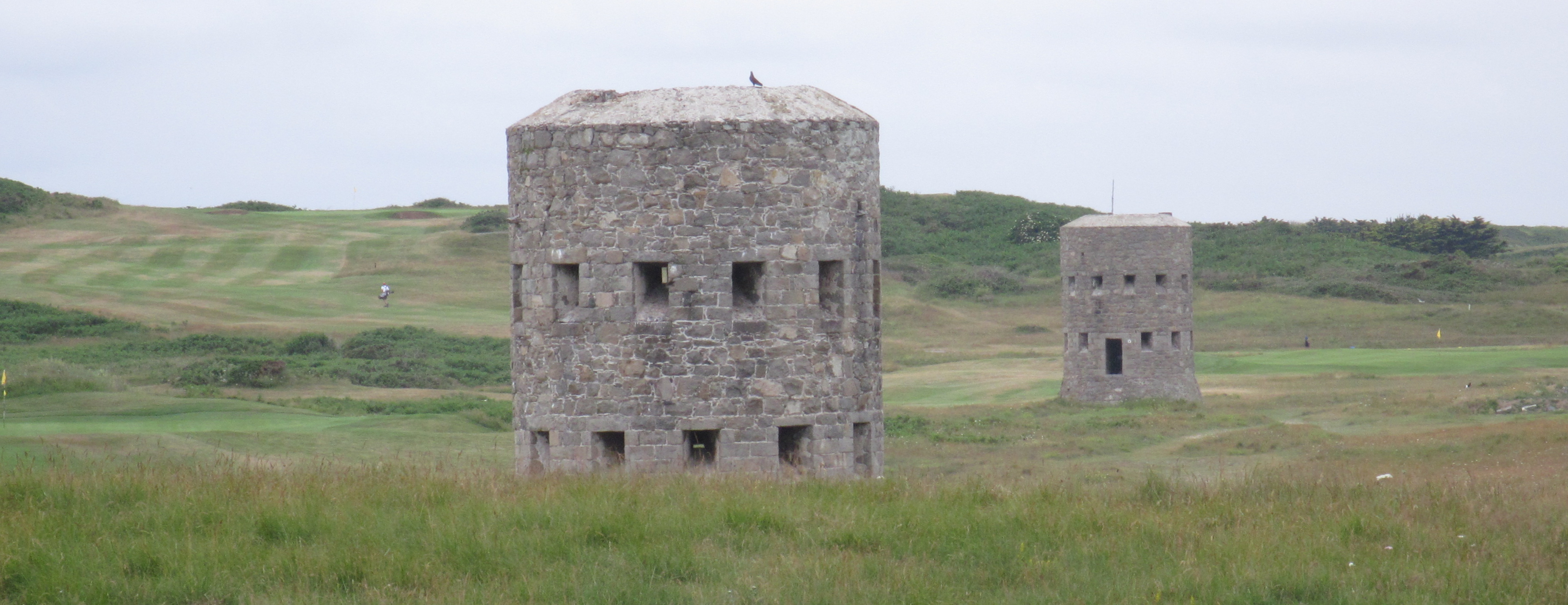
Loophole towers, L'Ancresse

- La Lochande Battery
- Pembroke headland fort and the Platon battery
- Pembroke star fort
- Half Moon battery
- Centre battery
- Nid de L’Herbe battery
- Fort le Marchant

Shooting ranges were established on the common in a number of locations, including an artillery range firing from close to the Vale Mill onto the common and into L’Ancresse bay.

==== Golf ====
Founded in 1890, the first Golf Club brought together a number of people interested in wielding gnarled sticks to try to send balls into holes cut in the grass.

This caused several cases of litigation between 1895 and 1908 as the laws of the common forbade the cutting of grass, or the removal of turf or sand. The law was changed in 1908. A clubhouse was built in 1892. The two golf clubs, Royal Guernsey Golf Club and L’Ancresse Golf Club, pay rent, agreed in 2016 at £50,000 p.a. for the use of the land, which comprises around half of the common.

=== 20th century ===
Around 1931 a proposal was put forward for the construction of an aerodrome on L’Ancresse, with three 720–850 yard runways. It was not taken up. A new golf club house was built in 1938.

The Occupation of Guernsey by German forces in 1940 saw five years of changes at L’Ancresse as it was a likely landing area. The Germans established numerous fortifications including:

- Anti-tank walls at Ladies Bay, Pembroke and L’Ancresse bay.
- Anti-aircraft battery containing six L401 bunkers for 8.8 cm guns with an L403 fire control bunker and an L405 radar bunker.
- Anti-aircraft battery in two Fl242 emplacements in Marine Stp Großhügel (Marine strongpoint) and a radar emplacement.
- Jägerstand casemates containing 10.5 cm French guns.
- Anti-tank 676 casemates for 4.7 cm Festungspak 36 (t) guns such as in Wn Dohlenturm on the eastern end of L’Ancresse bay.
- Trenches and machine gun positions.
- Naval range-finding tower (Marine Peilstand 1) (now buried in quarry)
- Personnel bunkers

For the millennium, a 20 ft stone, found in the bay, was erected as a menhir on a hill in 1999 and unveiled by Queen Elizabeth II. The stone and Her Majesty appear on a postage stamp to commemorate the Golden Jubilee of Elizabeth II.

== Usage ==
=== Sport ===
Sports undertaken at L’Ancresse include:

- Golf
- Parkrun
- Walking
- Football
- Horse riding and racing
- Shooting
- Cycling
- Beach sports
- Swimming

=== Facilities ===
Beach cafés and toilet facilities are available at L’Ancresse, together with 16 car parks.

=== Arts ===
Artists who have painted L’Ancresse include William Caparne and Paul Jacob Naftel.

Victor Hugo refers to the “haunted the dolmen of L’Ancresse” in his 1866 book Toilers of the Sea.

== Environment ==
There is a diversity of plant and animal species recorded from the area. The scrub is managed to stop the gorse overwhelming different habitats and noxious weeds are removed. La Société Guernesiaise through Environment Guernsey takes an interest in the common.

== Management ==
L’Ancresse common has been managed by the Vale Commons Council since 1875. Funding is from a grant from the States of Guernsey and from rent received. Most of the commons is now privately owned, with some owned by the council and some by the States of Guernsey.

Common rights include the right of commoners to collect gorse for fuel. Grazing is currently the sole right of ‘habitants’ – residents living on or immediately adjacent to the Common. There is also rights of passage.
