= Golf at the 2023 Island Games =

- Venue: L'Ancresse Golf Course, Guernsey
- Dates: 11–14 July
- Competitors: 74 men, 39 women from 21 nations

Golf, for the 2023 Island Games, was held at L'Ancresse Golf Course, Guernsey on 11 to 14 July 2023.

== Medal table ==
* Host nation (Guernsey)

Rank	Nation	Gold	Silver	Bronze	Total
1	Jersey (JEY)	2	2	0	4
2	Guernsey (GUE)*	1	1	1	3
3	Bermuda (BER)	1	1	0	2
4	Gotland	0	0	2	2
5	Isle of Man (IOM)	0	0	1	1
Totals (5 entries)		4	4	4	12

== Participating islands ==
- Åland Islands
- Alderney
- Bermuda
- Cayman Islands
- Falkland Islands
- Faroe Islands
- Frøya
- Gotland
- Greenland
- Guernsey (Host)
- Hitra
- Isle of Man
- Isle of Wight
- Jersey
- Menorca
- Orkney
- Saaremaa
- Saint Helena
- Shetland Islands
- Western Isles
- (Anglesey) Ynys Môn

== Results ==
Event	Gold		Silver		Bronze	
Men's individual	Josef Hacker; Jersey	281	Jamie Blondel; Guernsey	290	Jeremy Nicolle; Guernsey	297
Women's individual	Ebonie Cox; Bermuda	314	Flora Keites; Jersey	316	Christella Winzell; Gotland	318
Men's team	Guernsey; Daniel Blondel; Jamie Blondel; Jeremy Nicolle; Thomas Pattimore	882	Jersey; Alex Guelpa; Josef Hacker; Joshua Ozard; Matthew Parkman	894	Isle of Man; James Arneil; Daryl Callister; Liam Cowin; Robert Noon	900
Women's team	Jersey; Flora Keites; Helen Lagadu; Anabelle Lucas-Villar; Hannah Scriven	968	Bermuda; Kimberly Botelho; Tracy Burgess; Ebonie Cox; Ann Symonds	971	Gotland; Lina Billing; Linda Helledaij; Lina Svegsjö; Christella Winzell	984
