= Royal Guernsey Militia =

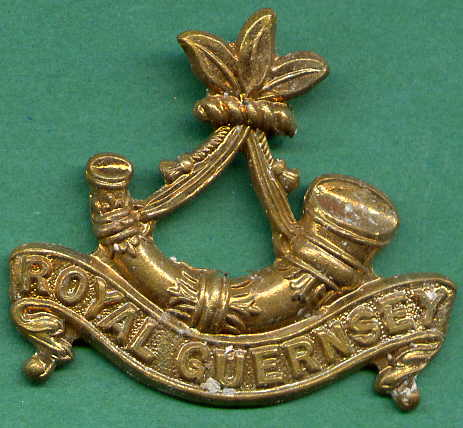
- Badge of the Royal Guernsey
- Active: 1337–1946
- Disbanded: 1951
- Country: United Kingdom
- Allegiance: The British Crown
- Branch: British Army
- Type: Militia (United Kingdom)
- Role: Infantry and coastal artillery
- Size: max 5,000
- Garrison/HQ: Guernsey
- Mascot: Donkey
- Engagements: The Great War
- Battle honours: Ypres 1916; Passchendaele; Cambrai 1917; Lys; Estaires; Hazebrouck; France and Flanders 1917–18.

Commanders
- Notable commanders: Sir Charles Andros (1664–1718); John Lambert (1797–1816); Michael Saward (1899–1903); Henry Nason (1921–1953)

The Royal Guernsey Militia has a history dating back 800 years. Always loyal to the British Crown, the men were unpaid volunteers whose wish was to defend the Island of Guernsey from foreign invaders.

Militias were also created in the Bailiwick islands of Alderney and Sark as well as in Jersey.

The commander of all military forces in Guernsey has always been appointed by the Crown, originally Wardens or Keepers, sometimes using the title Captain or Governor. Later becoming known as the Lieutenant Governor of Guernsey.

== History ==
=== Early history ===
Records indicate that Guernsey had formed an armed body to defend the Island over 800 years ago, in accordance with the order on 24 July 1203 of King John to provide a sufficiency of men and money to defend the Island from the enemy. In 1214 Eustace the Monk, a pirate, based in Sark arrived under orders from the King of France to harry the Channel Islands. In Guernsey he met a newly raised and locally armed defence force comprising the whole manhood of the Island. This could be considered to be the first Island militia.

A Henry III survey dated 1248 records that Islanders were free from (overseas) military service, excepting assisting the Duke of Normandy to recover England if necessary. The Island was invaded in 1294, Castle Cornet was held for several years before the French invaders were repulsed. The militia is first mentioned in 1331. A further French invasion took place in 1336 and was again repulsed.

At the start of the war, that would last for over a hundred years, King Edward III of England authorised Thomas de Ferres in 1337 to "levy and train" militias in the Guernsey, Jersey, Sark and Alderney, to the use of arms and to aray them in thousands, hundreds and twenties. The militias of Guernsey, Jersey, Alderney and Sark can claim to date from 1337, making them the oldest regiments of the British Army. The Sark Militia comprised 40 men known as the Quarantine.

In 1338 the Guernsey Militia had its first recorded battle. French Admiral Béhuchet landed an invasion force on the west coast of the Island. The Militia men from St Martin's and the Forest parishes met the French at Les Hubits and won the battle. For this act, King Charles II, 300 years later granted the South Regiment of militia permission to wear blue facing on their uniforms (a privilege only granted to Royal Regiments). Winning the battle did not win the war, the French Admiral returned later in the year and took the Island, including Castle Cornet where the 65 defenders, many militia men, were all killed, as were 12 other archers at Jerbourg Point. Guernsey sailors managed to put up some resistance with two Venetian galleys being sunk, however the Island was captured. In 1340 the Island was recaptured when the French retreated into the Castle, however the French held out in Castle Cornet until August 1345 when, after a three-day attack by professional soldiers and the local militia the castle was taken and all the French were killed. The King ordered St Peter Port to be defended by walls, it is not clear whether these walls were built, but a tower at Beauregard was constructed. In 1358 the French returned and the castle taken again, with the French evicted the next year and an island traitor executed.

Training was undertaken weekly in each parish, using common land, or at a specialist place near each church named Les Buttes where archery could be practiced. In 1372 Owain Lawgoch a claimant to the Welsh throne, at the head of a free company, on behalf of France, attacked Guernsey, popularly called "La Descente des Aragousais". Owain Lawgoch withdrew after killing 400 of the Island militia, when ordered by Charles V to sail to La Rochelle. A French assault in 1461, during the War of the Roses was repulsed.

1546 is the date of the first ordinance of the Royal Court. Requiring all men to obey their captains, work of defence works and provide their own weapons. The poor being provided with weapons by their parish. During the 15th and 16th Centuries the militia evolved into a parish basis, with each of the 10 parishes raising a company of around 100 men, commanded by a captain.

=== 17th and 18th centuries ===
By 1621 there were 1,157 men in the Militia, in 1656 there were 1,418 and by 1680 1,902. The militia men were not paid, service continuing to be compulsory because the fear of a French invasion was always present. It was possible to gain an exemption from service, but those who did were then resented by the rest of the population. Duties including attending reviews, practice and standing watch. If a militiaman was unable to attend they had to get someone else to do their duty. It was not unusual for women to do night guard duty, standing in for their men so they would be able to work the next day. There is a report that the French were put off landing on Alderney by the sight of a mass of red coats in a watch post, these being women.

During the Third English Civil War the Island supported Parliament, whereas Castle Cornet supported the King. In 1651, the Island of Jersey, which was Royalist, was taken by Parliamentarian forces and Ensign Nicholas Robert from Saint Martin, Guernsey militia was with the Parliamentarian forces. Whilst there he recovered the Crown of England that had belonged to Charles I from the cupola on top of the Court House in Jersey and brought it back to Guernsey, delivering it to the Governor of Castle Cornet.

It was only on 17 December 1651, after an 8-year siege, regular bombardments and half-hearted attacks, including one in March 1651 by the militia, where 30 were killed, that the castle capitulated, the last Royalist garrison to surrender. The Royal Crown was returned to London.

The general muster of militia in September 1656 with the Honourable Colonel Bingham, Governor of Guernsey, and Colonel Squire records 1,418 men under arms, 340 from Town, each other parish supplying between 48 and 180 men each. 1657 is the first written mention of the Alderney Militia. On 31 May 1660 the militia provided security for Charles II when he visited the Island.

The first Colonel of militia was Charles Andros (1664–1718) who appointed his two sons as Captains of the two companies in Town. At a review in 1664 1,324 soldiers paraded, not including artillery men, men without arms and elderly militiamen. Following his death the militia took over guard duties at Castle Cornet in St Peter Port. Officers provided their own arms and uniforms, poorer soldiers were supplied them.

In 1730 there is a first mention of militia Regiments, (rather than Parish companies), each commanded by a Colonel. In 1755 orders were given to form two artillery companies. In 1780 the south militia regiment was split to make a fourth or "west" regiment.

=== Seven Years War to Napoleonic Wars ===
This was a period of heightened danger, Guernsey loophole towers being authorized in 1778 although most were built after 1781. The tower and battery at Rousse has been restored as a museum. Guernsey passed an ordinance requiring the militia men to wear uniforms in 1780, paid for by each man if they could afford it, otherwise by the parish. Jersey was invaded by French Royalist forces in 1781 following an attempted one in 1779, landing safely the French marched into Saint Helier where the situation resulted in the Battle of Jersey. The British government undertook to supply the militia with uniforms in 1782 and more regular British troops were brought to the island to garrison Fort George which was under construction.

On 27 March 1783 there was a mutiny in Guernsey by 500 regular soldiers, mainly Irish soldiers in the recently created 104th Regiment, at winter quarters in Fort George, caused possibly by some discharged men from the recently disbanded 83rd Regiment who had just been sent to join the 104th on the island. The soldiers demanded that the fort gates be left open so they could come and go as they pleased, whilst this was agreed, the soldiers inside the fort a few days later, fired at their officers whilst at dinner in the mess, forcing them to withdraw from the fort. Both the 18th Regiment (the Royal Irish) and the Guernsey Militia turned out with 6 pieces of artillery. Volleys of shots were fired by the rebels, but when the militia outflanking the rebels, they surrendered. The rebels had, during their period in charge, continued to mount guards and undertake the normal routine of the fort despite the lack of officers. The Government of Guernsey gave a public thanks to the 18th Regiment and militiamen, awarding them 100 guineas. Two men were wounded, 36 ringleaders arrested and the 104th Regiment was disbanded.

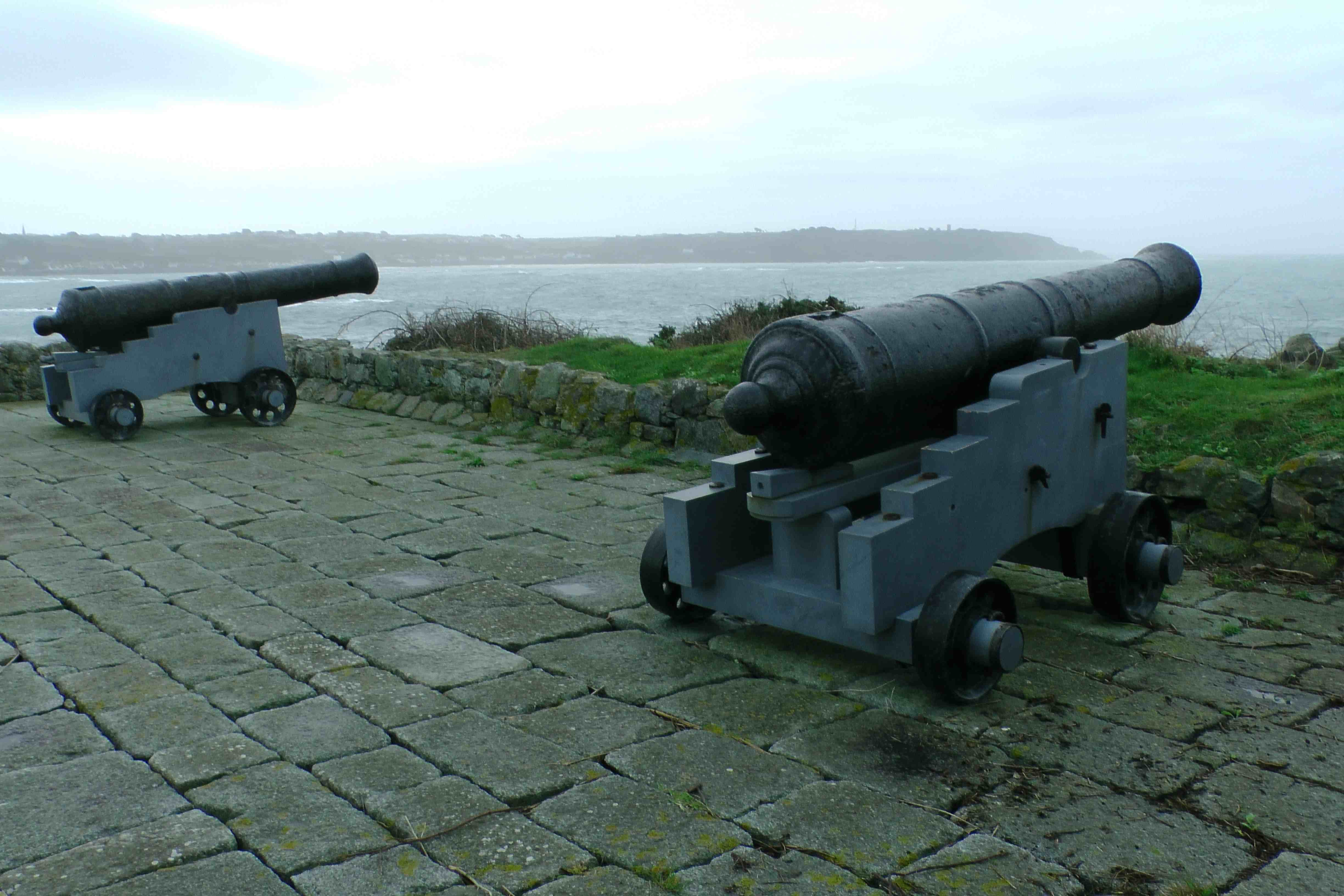
Two cannon on a militia battery, overlooking L'Eree Bay, Guernsey

The militia was upgraded, four regiments, East (or Town) regiment with white facings, "Le Regiment Vert" was in the North, "Le Regiment Bleu" in the South and "Le Regiment Noir" in the West. There was also a field artillery regiment. There were objections to the men providing their own uniforms, to get over the appeal made to the Privy Council, the King agreed to pay for new red uniforms. The States agreed to pay a pension to any militiaman wounded or killed. In 1795 one soldier on sentry duty at Hougue à la Pierre battery, Belle Grave Bay, was caught insisting civilians provide him with the military password or pay a fee if they wanted to pass by. British officers were appointed to command the militia from 1799. The militia being considered as the first line of defence against the expected French invasion and were constantly exercising and called out for guard and watch duties. A prize of £25 was offered to the first person to give warning of the approach of a French fleet.

Defences were strengthened, over 60 gun emplacements and ammunition magazines were built to defend possible landing beaches, manned by the militia artillery regiment. Three Martello Towers were built in 1804. The Fort Grey martello tower has been restored as a museum.

Guernsey in the early 19th-century had a population of just over 10,000, and militia troops now totalled 3,158 with an additional 450 marching boys. They were designated Light Regiments. Rifle companies were added to the establishment. The Island receiving praise for the way the militia carried out their duties. Militiamen were exempt from being pressed into the Navy.

Guernsey often had a regular army regiment based in the Island, and because of the British rule that foreign troops were not allowed on mainland Britain, the troops billeted in Guernsey were often foreigners, Russians, Dutch, Brunswick and French royalists. There are graves of Russian soldiers at the Vale Castle.

With the draining of the Braye du Valle by 1808, new military roads were built, the "Route Militaire" along the Braye du Valle to the Vale Church, with other roads improved to military standard, from St Peter Port to Fort Hommet and from St Peter Port via St. Martin to the Forest where it split with one branch going to Torteval, the other to Fort Grey.

=== 19th century ===
In 1825 the light companies were converted to rifle companies and dressed in green.

In January 1831 William IV, to commemorate the 50th anniversary of the Battle of Jersey, granted the use of the title "Royal" making the name Royal Guernsey Militia and the facings on all uniforms changed to blue.

The dragoons were disbanded in 1835. In 1842 the Lieutenant Governor changed to General Napier. He caused quite an upset in the Island, being rude to the Bailiff and ignoring the Courts and Laws of the Island. An incident occurred in 1845 whereby a Captain of Militia was reduced to the ranks without an explanation resulted in two Lieutenant Colonels and five other Captains resigning and also being reduced to the ranks, they not being allowed to leave the militia due to the rules of compulsory service. The situation was rectified when General Napier was replaced in 1848.

From 1845, compulsory service was not required for men aged over 45, except in time of war. Uniforms for the three regiments continued with differing facings, North was Green, the West had Black and the South Blue.

A review of Guernsey's defences in 1852 recommended the construction of three artillery barracks, Fort Richmond, Fort Hommet, and Fort Le Marchant, the upgrading of Fort Doyle, and the construction of Bréhon Tower, the latter was completed in 1856. Rifles were changed to breach loading in 1870. In 1873 the British army provided a regular army adjutant and staff to each regiment.

Arsenal buildings were constructed, partly for use by the artillery regiments, partly as drill halls. The Town Arsenal being built in 1850 and became the headquarters of the Militia. Other arsenals for the 2nd and 3rd regiments being built in 1882. The Town Arsenal being used by the Guernsey Fire Brigade from 1935.

A detachment of the Royal Guernsey Militia attended the 1897 Diamond Jubilee of Queen Victoria as well as competing at Bisley. Guernsey won the Kolapore Cup, a shooting competition open to all countries in the British Empire, including a team representing the mother country, in 1898 at Bisley. In 1899 Private William A. Priaulx won the Queen's Prize at Bisley, considered the most coveted prize in the shooting world.

The British system of appointing British officers caused some difficulties, it must be remembered that French was the main language of the Island and service was obligatory. There was trouble and resentment which culminated in 1899 when the North regiment mutinied and was then disbanded.

The end of the century saw the start of the Anglo Boer War. The Island was very patriotic with many men, who would have been militia men, volunteering to fight for the Queen.

=== 20th century ===
In 1901 Guernsey passed a law confirming that service was compulsory, unless exempted, with an upper age of 60 in time of war and 45 in time of peace. 10 years active service, with an establishment of 1,000 during peace and 2,000 in time of war, comprising one artillery regiment, two of infantry and two infantry reserves. The law also confirmed the Army Act 1881 applied to the Island. In 1901 it was reported that any man in Guernsey, when called upon, was bound by law to attend with pay 21 days of training with the Militia until he was declared efficient. This training took place during the month of August, and any man failing to make the grade had to return the following year until he qualified.

In February 1906 militiamen became eligible for the Militia Long Service Medal. The medal was awarded for 18 years of efficient and irreproachable service in the Militia and attending 15 annual camps.

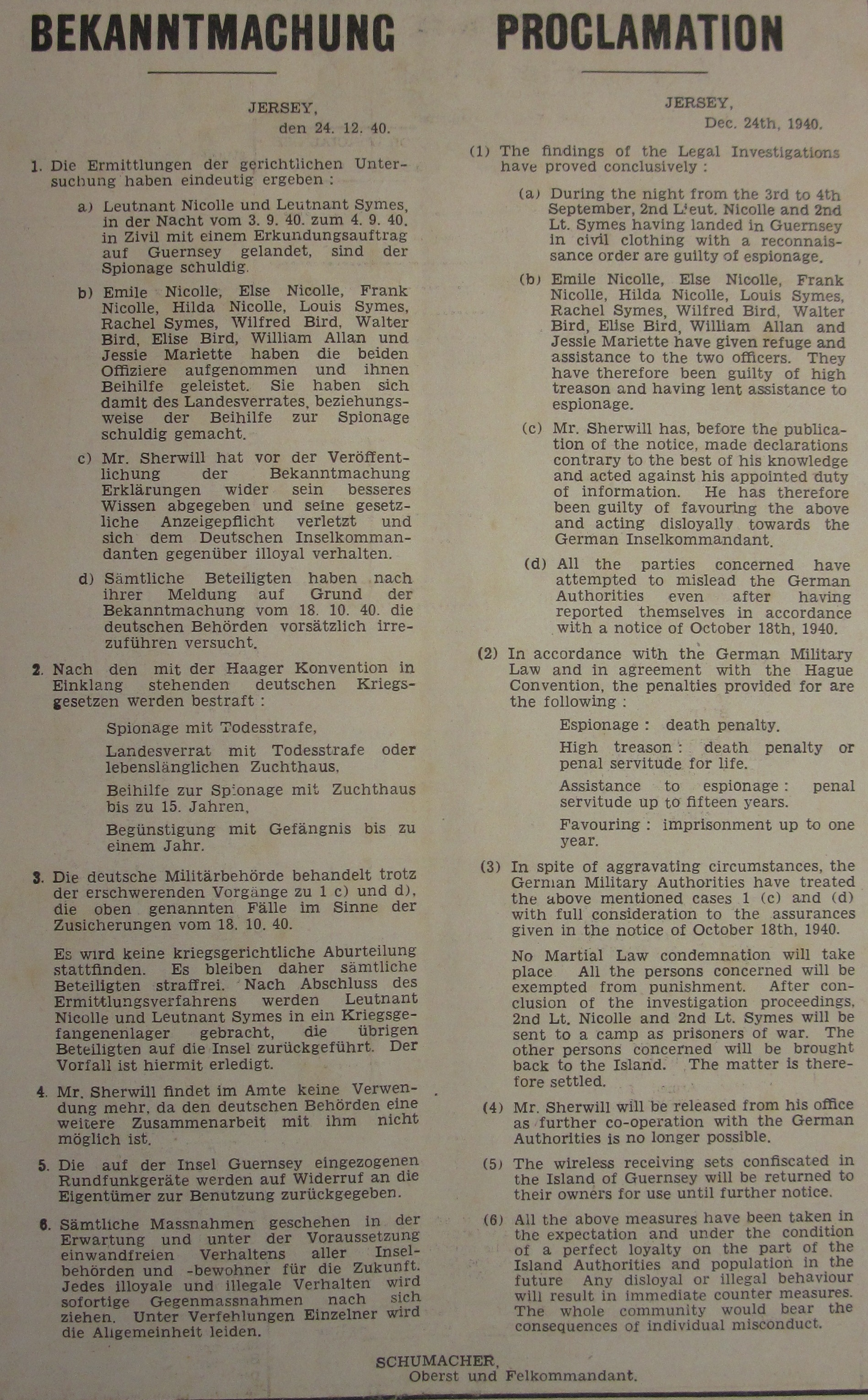
German proclamation of measures against Hubert Nicolle, James Symes, Ambrose Sherwill, and others following Operation Ambassador

The Royal Guernsey Militia, comprising two infantry regiments and an artillery regiment, could not fight as a unit outside the island except to help the King regain his throne. Accordingly, the militia was disbanded in 1916 to allow the Royal Guernsey Light Infantry to be raised, the Island waiving its rights and allowing the first battalion of the regiment to serve overseas and introducing conscription. A second (reserve) battalion remaining in Guernsey. Casualties in France were high. 327 died, 667 wounded and 255 became prisoners. The severely depleted regiment becoming GHQ troops guarding General Haig from April 1918.

From 1920 Royal Guernsey Militia and Royal Alderney Artillery Militia British army numbers were in the block 7539001 – 7560000 (Use of the numbers were discontinued in 1929). Reinstated after World War I in 1922, the militia was scaled back in 1929, following a reduction in funding, to a small volunteer force.

The militia was demilitarised in 1940, with all equipment being shipped to England just before the invasion of Guernsey by German forces.

One former member of the militia, Lt. Hubert Nicholle who had travelled to England in 1939 to join the Hampshire Regiment agreed to travel back to Guernsey by the British submarine H43 where on 7 July 1940 he undertook a successful reconnaissance of German defences in the Island during the lead up to Operation Ambassador, before being picked up on 10 July. Undertaking a second landing with fellow Guernseyman Lt. James Symes on 3 September 1940, in civilian clothing, the pickup arrangements failed and the two were forced to surrender, after having obtained help from Ambrose Sherwill to get Guernsey Militia uniforms, being treated as POWs rather than shot as spies. Nicholle was awarded the MC.

The militia was reconstituted after the war, however in 1951 the States of Guernsey finally decided not to revive the militia.

== Honours ==
=== Orders and medals – The Great War ===
Serving with Royal Guernsey Light Infantry see RGLI Honours and Awards

Serving with other units:

- Lt Col H de L Walters DSO
- Captain R.T. Perry MC
- 2nd Lt W.H. Ozanne MC
- Lt A. Sherwill MC
- Sgt D. Bisset DCM and MM
- Pvt H.J. Bisson MM
- Pvt E.W. Dennis MM
- Pvt S.J. O'Meara MM
- Pvt Sgt S. Paul MM
- Pvt L/Cpl C. Queripel MM
- Pvt J. Reaux MM
- Pvt Cpl F. Sangan MM
- A/Sgt J.J. Stagg MM
- Cpl T.H. Torode MM
- L/Cpl G. Walden MM
- Pvt W.A. le Lievre MM
- Bdr H.A. Adams MM
- Sgt S. Allen MM
- Sgt J.F. Mahy Croix de Guerre
- Sgt Maj J.R.N. Kirkwood Croix de Guerre and Officer of Order of Leopold
- Cpl E.W. Oliver Croix de Guerre
- WO2 F. Robin Chevalier of Order of Leopold

=== Orders and medals – The Boer War ===
- Lt G. Dobree DSO

=== Battle honours ===
In February 1925, in accordance with General Order No 5034 The London Gazette published a complete list of Battle Honours awarded for the Great War.

In General Orders, 1928, "Honours awarded to Militia Corps for services previous to the Great War shall pass to the reconstituted Militia Regiment and shall be emblazoned on all Regimental Standards, Guidons or Colours"

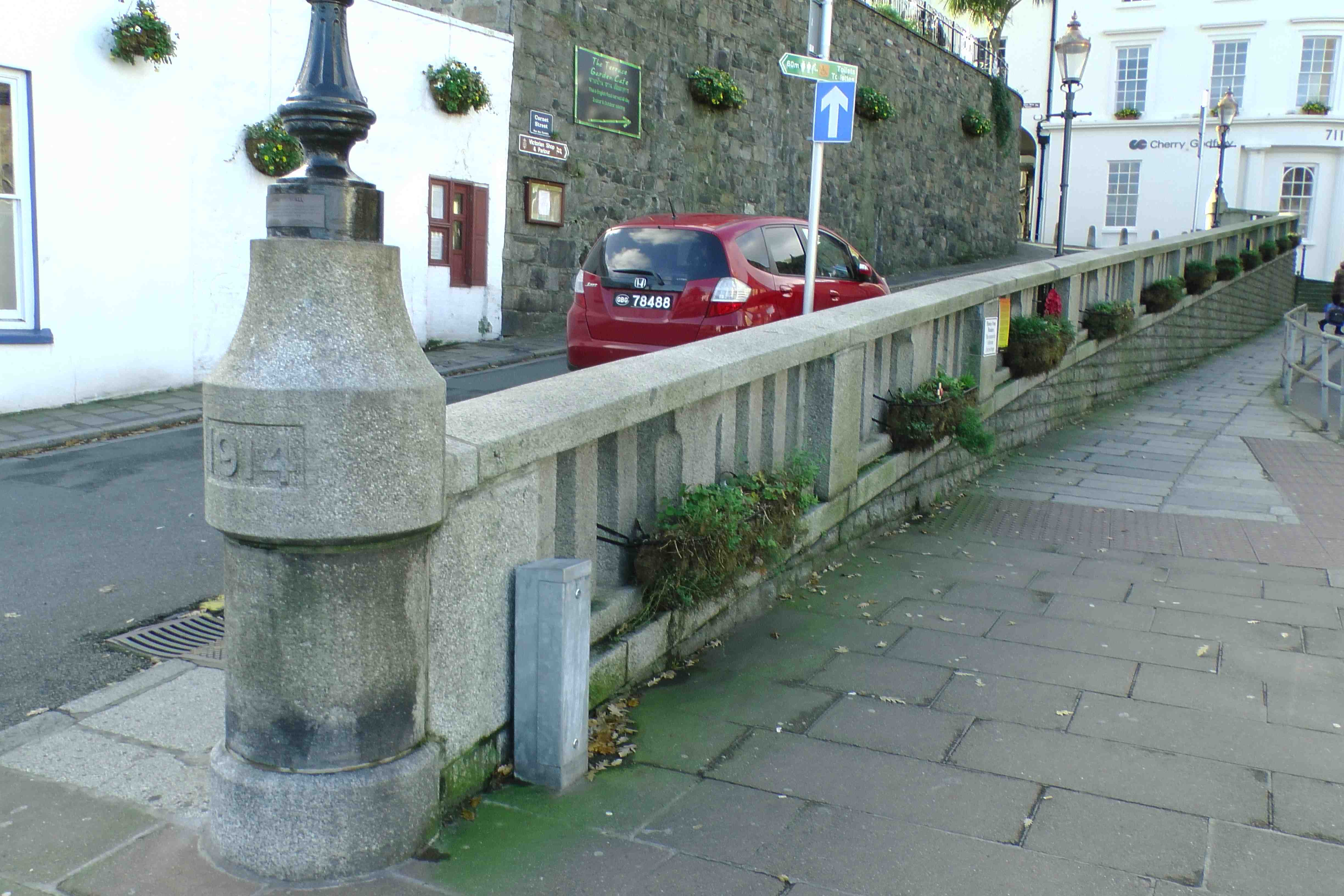
Loafers wall, in remembrance of Guernseymen who died in WW1

Following the disbandment of the Royal Guernsey Light Infantry in 1919, the 1st Battalion Royal Guernsey Militia were granted the following Battle Honours:

- Ypres 1917
- Passchendaele
- Cambrai 1917
- Lys
- Estaires
- Hazebrouck
- France and Flanders 1917–1918.

== Museum ==
The Royal Guernsey Militia museum, opened in 2011, is located at Castle Cornet and holds weapons, uniforms, standards, medals and trophies of the militia as well as the parade blanket of the militia mascot, a Guernsey donkey.

The old regimental colours of the North Regiment are held in St Sampson's Church. The Town Church holds the colours of the Town Regiment.

Royal Guernsey Militia uniforms have been commemorated in a series of postage stamps issued by Guernsey Post in 1974.

== See also ==
- Royal Guernsey Light Infantry
- Royal Militia of the Island of Jersey
- History of Guernsey
