= William Le Lacheur =

Guernsey sailor and entrepreneur (1802–1863)

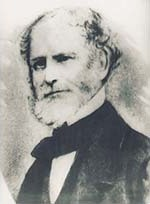
- Le Lacheur c. 1850–1863
- Born: 15 October 1802; Guernsey, Channel Islands
- Died: 27 June 1863 (aged 60); London, England
- Occupations: Merchant and ship-owner
- Spouse: Rachel de Jersey
- Parent(s): Jean Le Lacheur and Marie Suzanne (née Allez)
- Website: William Le Lacheur

William Le Lacheur or Guillaume Le Lacheur (15 October 1802 – 27 June 1863), was a Guernsey sea captain who played an important role in the economic and spiritual development of Costa Rica.

Le Lacheur is widely credited in Costa Rica with having transformed the economy of the country by establishing a direct regular trade route for Costa Rican coffee growers to the European market, thereby helping to establish the Costa Rican coffee trade.

== Biography ==
=== Early life ===
William Le Lacheur was born on 15 October 1802 and was baptised Guillaume Le Lacheur (using the French version of the forename) in the parish church of the Forest, Guernsey, on 31 October by his parents Jean Le Lacheur and Marie Suzanne (née Allez). He was named after his grandfather, Guillaume Allez, who was also one of his godparents.

Little is known of his education and upbringing. At a young age, he went to sea, working his way up to become the captain of his first ship, St George, in 1827.

Le Lacheur married Rachel de Jersey (1798–1882) in the parish church of Forest on 19 May 1828. They had five children:-

- Rachel de Jersey Le Lacheur (1832–1867)
- Emma Le Lacheur (1842–?)
- Amelia Le Lacheur (1834–1891) married Thomas Bull Allen
- John Allez Le Lacheur (1838–?) married Lydia Judith Domaille
- Louisa Maria Le Lacheur (1840–?) married Benjamin Abbot Lyon (1837, Poplar, Middlesex, England - 1904, Hampstead, London, England) founder of Casa Lyon, Costa Rica (known as Banco Lyon from 1947 to 1993)

=== Costa Rica coffee trade ===
In 1830, he entered the Azores fruit trade with the ship Minerva. By 1836, he had formed a company Le Lacheur & Co, which owned two ships: Minerva and Dart. Over the following years, he continued to add to his fleet, and to seek out new markets. In 1841, Le Lacheur took delivery of the barque Monarch. The Monarch was a much larger vessel and capable of journeys further afield. During a stop at the port of Mazatlán, on the Pacific coast of Mexico, he learnt from the British Consul of the difficulty that the Costa Rican coffee growers were having in finding a market for their produce.

Since its independence in 1821, Costa Rica had found no regular trade routes for its coffee in European markets. This was compounded by transportation problems. The coffee-growing areas were located in the central part of the country and it was impossible, because of the mountains and the rainy forest, to send the coffee to the Caribbean Sea and therefore to the Atlantic. It was much easier to ship the coffee to a Pacific port, Puntarenas, and to sail around Cape Horn to the Atlantic. The Caribbean railway from San José to the Caribbean port called Puerto Limón were not built until 1888.

William saw a business opportunity, and agreed with Costa Rican coffee growers to establish a regular service to carry their coffee to London. In 1843, the Monarch arrived in Puntarenas and loaded the first cargo of nearly 5,000 bags of coffee.

The venture was a success, and he began increasing the size of his fleet to accommodate the increasing demand for coffee in London. During the rest of the 1840s, he diverted his other ships from the fruit trade to the coffee trade. Then, starting in 1850, he commissioned the construction of five ships designed especially for the coffee trade. During the 1860s, a further seven ships were added to the fleet.

=== Contribution to Costa Rica ===
In addition to his contribution to the Costa Rican economy through establishing trade routes, Le Lacheur made a significant impact on the development of a number of other aspects of Costa Rica.

==== Religious life ====
Le Lacheur, a devout Christian, was appalled by what he described "the lowest form of the Roman faith" being practised, where superstition took precedence over true religion. Through the British and Foreign Bible Society, he obtained and distributed Spanish language Bibles, thereby introducing the Protestant faith into Costa Rica. He distributed 3,500 bibles in Costa Rica, and was presented with an inscribed Imperial Quarto Bible by the Bible Society in recognition of his achievements.

In 1864, the year after Le Lacheur's death, it was resolved to build the first Protestant church in Costa Rica. It was made of pre-fabricated iron, was carried to Costa Rica by Le Lacheur's son John and was assembled in San José as the Church of the Good Shepherd, see of the Episcopal Church of Costa Rica (Anglican faith). It became unofficially known as the 'Iron Church'. When it was rebuilt in 1937 with more traditional materials, a memorial plaque was erected to Le Lacheur with an inscription which includes the phrase "by whose exertions public Protestant worship was established in this Republic".

==== Education ====
Once Le Lacheur had established a fleet of ships that were regularly making journeys between Costa Rica and London, he arranged with several Costa Rican families to take their sons to England for their education. This has been cited as a contributing factor to Costa Rica's economic success.

In 1822, James Gerard (a Scottish mining prospector) and Richard Trevithick took two Costa Rican schoolboys José María Montealegre (a future president of Costa Rica 1859–1863) and his younger brother Mariano to a boarding school the UK; the elder studied medicine and became a surgeon at Aberdeen University.

Le Lacheur "took young Costa Ricans to England and installed them in professional schools, fretting over them like a parent and taking them back to Costa Rica, prepared to fill important roles as professionals" (Wilton Nelson, 1985; cited by Julio Murray and John L. Kater Jr.

This arrangement was also responsible for the introduction of the game of football to Costa Rica.

==== Defence ====
When William Walker, an American filibuster, attempted to invade Costa Rica in 1856, the Costa Rican government declared war. However, the march from the Costa Rican military base in San José to the northern border was an arduous one. Le Lacheur put his ships at the disposal of the Costa Rican military commanders to transport the army up the coast to the border so that they would arrive fit and ready to fight. As a result, they successfully repelled the filibusters.

== Memorials ==
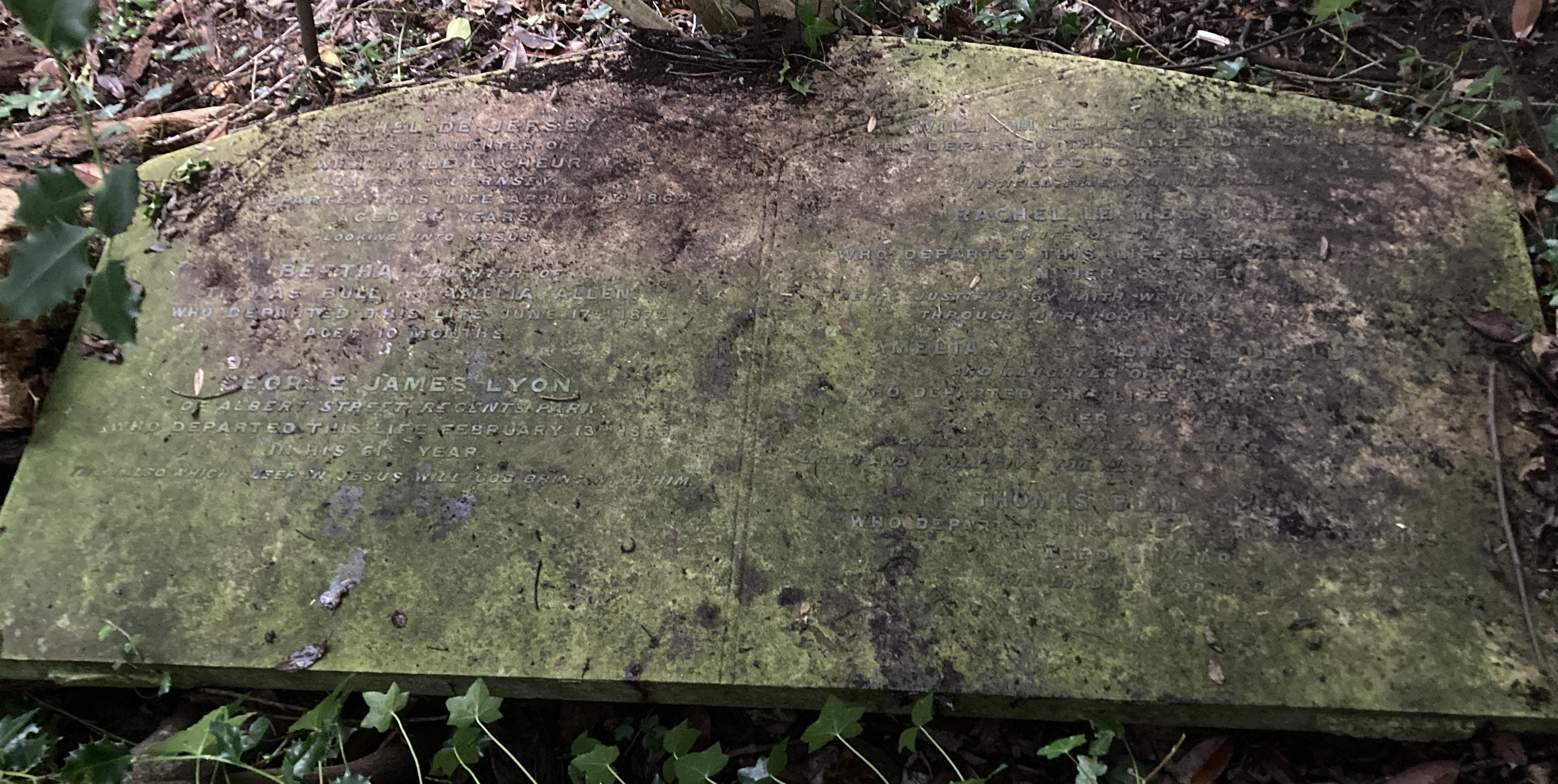
Family grave of William Le Lacheur in Highgate Cemetery

He is buried in a family grave on the western side of Highgate Cemetery in London.

There is a memorial to Captain William Le Lacheur of Guernsey in the Church of the Good Shepherd in San José, Costa Rica.

Postage stamps have been issued commemorating his achievements by both his native Guernsey (1997) and Costa Rica (1963).

On 6 September 2022, a Blue Plaque was unveiled to William Le Lacheur at L'Epinel Farm, Rue de L'Epinel, Forest in Guernsey by the Bailiff of Guernsey, Sir Richard McMahon and the Costa Rican Ambassador to the United Kingdom, His Excellency Mr Rafael Ortiz Fábrega.

== See also ==
- History of Guernsey
- History of Costa Rica

== Sources ==
- Sharp, EW, A Very Distinguished Guernseyman – Captain William Le Lacheur, Transactions of La Société Guernesiaise , 1976
- Marr, LJ, More Guernsey People, Guernsey Society , 1981
