= Vavasour (surname) =

Vavasour is a surname. Notable people with the surname include:

- Vavasour (family), an English Catholic family dating back to Norman times
  - Anne Vavasour (c. 1560–c. 1650), Maid of Honour to Queen Elizabeth I, and mistress of Edward de Vere, 17th Earl of Oxford
  - Thomas Vavasour (about 1536/7–1585), physician and recusant of the reign of Queen Elizabeth I
  - Thomas Vavasour (knight marshal) (1560–1620), Knight Marshal to King James I
- John Vavasour (c. 1440–1506), English judge
- Sir Henry Vavasour, benefactor of All Saints' Church, Barwick-in-Elmet, Leeds
- Mervin Vavasour (1821–1866), officer of the British Army Royal Engineers
- William Vavasour (1514–1566), English Member of Parliament and High Sheriff of Yorkshire

== See also ==
- Vavasseur
