= Braye du Valle, Guernsey =

Coordinates: 49.487°N 2.535°W

The Braye du Valle is the area between the main Island of Guernsey and Le Clos du Valle, which was a tidal island to the north.

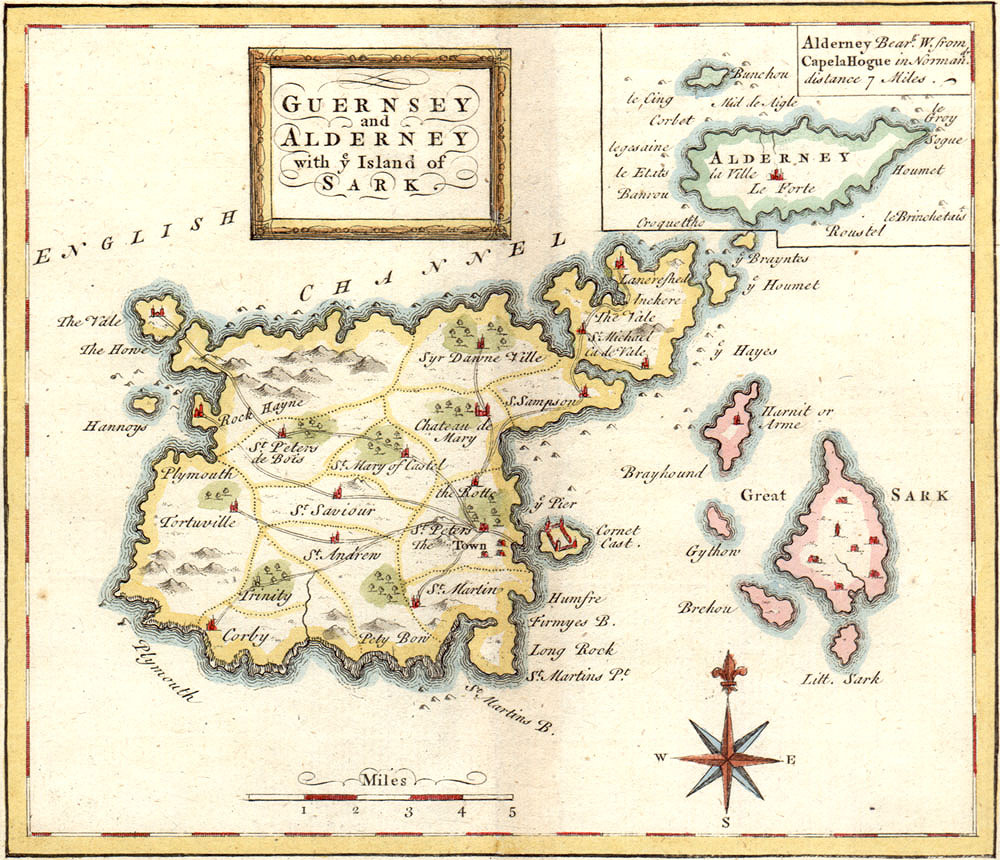
Guernsey and Alderney with Island of Sark 1748

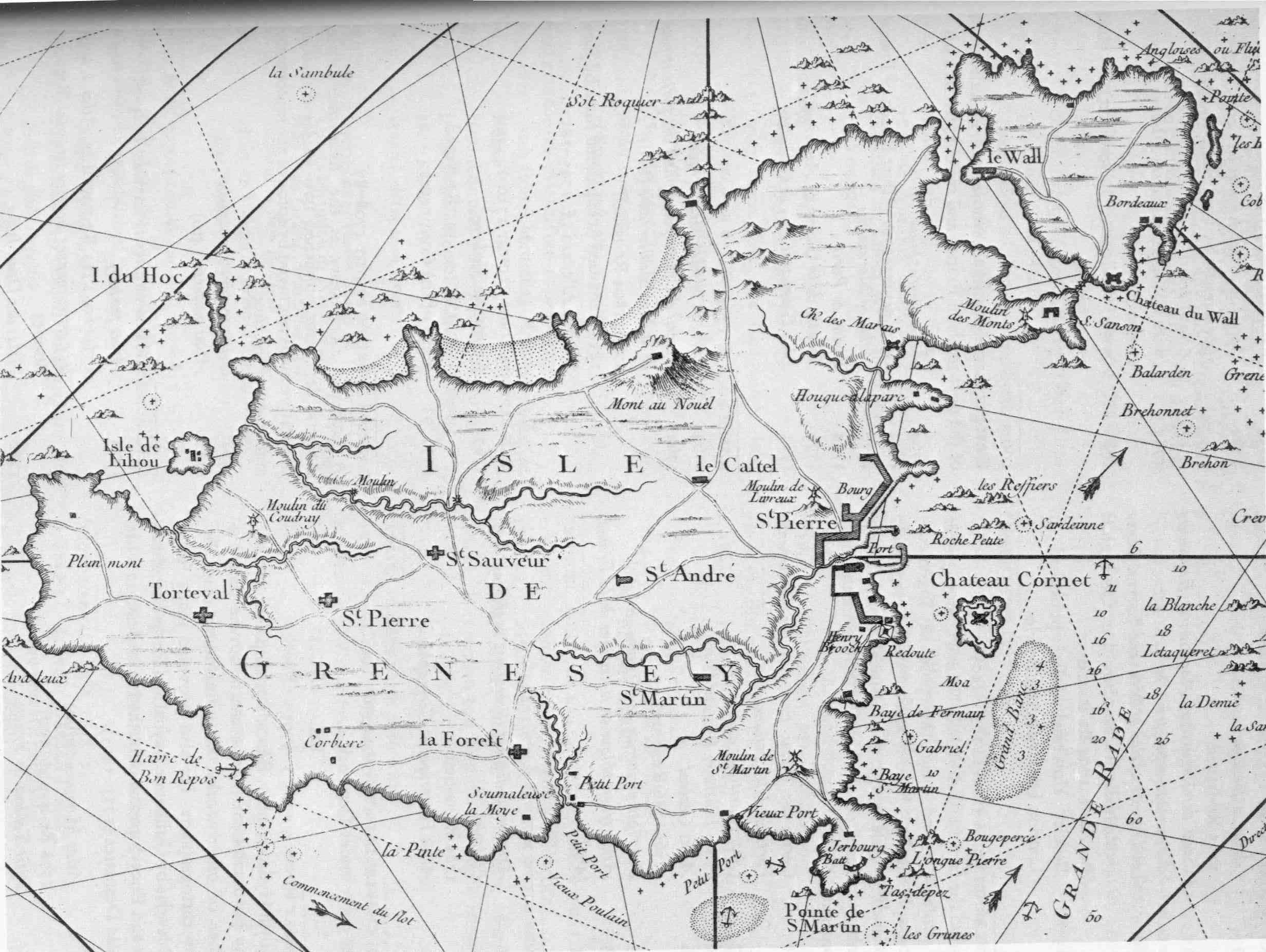
Guernsey 1757

== Origins ==
The original reason for the separation of the north of the Island of Guernsey may relate to seismic disturbances or changes in the sea level. The rise and fall of the tide in Guernsey is over 10 metres (33 ft) which creates energy to move loose materials.

The Braye was open to the sea and the shoreline moves with the waves and the tides. Gravel and sand are deposited onshore, only to be swept back offshore. Storms batter the coast, and tides flood areas on a daily basis. The premier forces that shape the coastal landscape, however, are waves. Beaches are not fixed features, they are dynamic environments.

At the eastern end an iron age fort, later to become the castle of Saint Michael where in 1117 there was a large ceremony to celebrate the finalisation of major works. Granite walls and gate were added in the 15th century, barracks in the 18th century, and the name "Vale Castle" is now the common name.

It is likely that at one time a land bridge connected the two sections next to the Vale church, before the sea broke through. In 1204 it is reported that the Royal Court of Guernsey visited the Braye du Valle to replace boundary markers that had been washed away.

The Braye covered around 350 acres of sand, gravel, clay and bog. Water channels one or two feet deep ran its entire length. Salterns and marshy meadows that flooded at high tide formed the sides. Saltpans operated on the southern side. 1,600 metres (5,200 ft) long, up to 750 metres (2,460 ft) wide and 3 metres (9.8 ft) to 9 metres (30 ft) deep at high water.

A leper hospice founded to care for returning crusaders in the 12th century, who had contracted the disease was located at Maladerie Road in St Sampsons, with the cemetery on the edge of Braye du Valle, now covered by L'Islet road. It closed when the disease faded away in the 16th century.

== Crossings ==
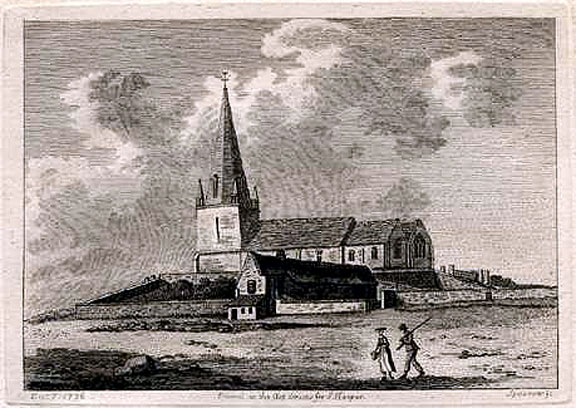
Vale Church from Braye du Valle, at low water

- The Great bridge also known as the Pont du Valle

1204 is the date mentioned for a bridge. It had to be maintained in good condition. The bridge was requested in a petition by parish residents dated 4 October 1204 following the loss of a causeway to sea damage. There is mention of the bridge being destroyed in 1299, with the perpetrators being charged and fined.

The “great bridge” is mentioned in a response from Charles II in 1666. The bridge has, for as long as records exist, been wide enough for pedestrians and wagons, constructed of stone with a nearby sluice or “nocq”.

F.C. Lucas, mentions a stone bridge called “Le Pont du Valle” built of heavy rock with an open bridge to allow the water to pass underneath, at the “Bouche du Valle” near the Vale church.

- Low water bridges

There were two small connected bridges at the Vale Church, the Pont St Michel and the Pont Allaire crossing two streams. These bridges were made of large stones with stone slabs resting on top. The structures were underwater at high tide, and the stones would have been covered with seaweed. They are reputed to have been built by monks from Mont Saint-Michel who had settled in Guernsey around 968 A.D. The bridges still existed in 1715.

- Ferry

A ferry existed near the Vale Church, which must have assisted worshippers attending the Vale Church.

- Fords

Three causeways were identified, one being destroyed in 1708. The 1787 map records a low water crossing point west of the great bridge.

== Ownership ==
Originally owned by the Crown, on 27 July 1640 Charles I gave the Braye du Valle, together with other flooded lands, to Sir Henry de Vic in consideration of long service to the Crown. The registration of the title was delayed 25 years because of the English Civil War. This also resulted in the boundaries being formally defined and recorded.

By 1708 the Braye was owned by Henry de Sausmarez who reclaimed some of the land to construct the salt-pans, the export of salt from Guernsey to England being duty free. In 1730 the Braye was sold to a syndicate of five men for £125. And it was this syndicate that sold the Braye to the British Government in 1805 to enable it to be reclaimed.

== 17th and 18th centuries ==
Sir Henry de Vic considered reclaiming the Braye and petitioned Charles II for leave to do so. The King gave “all those our lands overflowed by sea in our Island of Guernsey situated and lying from the church of the Valle there as far as the great bridge along that side which is the north east side: from the said bridge all along Saint Sampson, which is the south west side, as far as that part which is right against the said church of the Valle…” to Sir Vic. The area was surveyed, but no work was undertaken.

In 1758 a law was passed fining militia soldiers 14 sols tournois if they refused to stand guard north of the Braye du Valle, some soldiers complaining that they were afraid of drowning when crossing the Braye.

The Duke of Richmond as Master-General of the Ordnance, commissioned a military survey map of Guernsey, the Braye is well marked as a channel. It was undertaken by William Gardner before 1787.

== Reclamation ==
In 1803, the newly appointed Lieutenant Governor of Guernsey, Major-General John Doyle, was tasked with improving the Island defences. He became concerned with the possibility of French troops landing in the north of the Island and British troops, the militia and artillery being unable to cross the Braye to contest the landing. Not knowing whether he would fight the French as an Admiral or General, as it would depend on the state of the tide.

The concern about an invasion was because of the successful Privateer business undertaken by Guernsey. During the eight years of the American Revolutionary War Guernsey ships carrying letter of marque had captured French and American vessels to the value of £900,000 and continued to operate during the Napoleonic Wars

The proposal was opposed by the States of Guernsey who would have preferred the Braye to be dredged and straightened to enable larger ships to sail along the channel with quarried stone. This opposition was defeated by the eloquence of Doyle.

Major-General Doyle’s proposal was to dam the extremities of the Braye at the bridge and near the Vale Church, so enclosing around 300 acres. Approval was granted and work began in 1806, being paid for by the British Government. The Government having to pay people with rights to the foreshore and business that would be damaged for loss of earnings. Along the southern shores of the Braye du Valle had been salt pans, their owners receiving compensation for their loss. The saltpan businesses receiving £1,750, with the other owners being paid £1,500. In total £3,250 was paid out.

An advert appeared in the Gazette de Guernsey on 1 March 1806 inviting tenders for the construction of two dams,. The work should be done in a solid and permanent manner with the contractor responsible for repairs for the first seven years following completion. The contract would be paid in installments and in the event of failure to meet the terms of the contract, the builder would forfeit the amount paid. The contract was awarded to Thomas Henry, from Les Mielles in Clos du Valle, and work began on 12 July 1806. Soldiers were provided to assist with the labour at a cost of 10d a day for a private and a shilling for a sergeant. The embankments being sufficient by late 1806 to stop the tides entering the Braye.

== Construction method ==
An embankment or dyke was built at Grande Havre, to the west of the Vale Church out of large stones with a brick wall to retain the sand and gravel that was piled up on the landward side.

At the St Sampson’s end a different approach was undertaken. A stone wall was built parallel to the bridge, it was reinforced with clay to provide waterproofing. This created a wide roadway connecting the two Islands above high water level.

Sluices were created at both ends to allow surface water to drain at low tide. The whole of the work being undertaken using men, with horse and carts to transport the materials. The work was completed in 1808 and on completion, Mr Henry was presented with a sword by Lieutenant-General Sir John Doyle.

In 1812 damage was found to have been caused to the Vale church embankment from storms. Quarries in the area were given permission to dump ship ballast and stone waste against the embankment to improve the defences.

By 1835 a great deal of sand had accumulated against the Vale church embankment.

== 19th and 20th centuries ==
In 1811, once the land had had time to drain, the majority of the recovered land was sold to six buyers, Pierre Yves Bardel, Henry Giffard, Daniel Mollet, Isaac Carre and Jean Allez. Part of the land being retained to provide a military drill ground.

The £5,375 raised from the sale, less the cost, was put towards the £8,773 cost of improving two roads from St Peter Port to Rocquaine and to Vazon and the construction of a new road across the Braye, which became known as “Route Militaire”, running from Les Banques to L'Ancresse. The rest of the cost being met from a grant of £5,000 from the British Government.

Fishermen petitioned Doyle on the basis that they had lost their mooring facilities. They were successful and a pier was built at Les Amarreurs at a cost of £60 for their use.

The owners of the reclaimed land were given an obligation to keep the Great Bridge, sluices and douits (ditches) maintained, although this obligation ended in 1872. The area of land in Guernsey materially increased with the tidal channel being turned into profitable meadows. In 1872 the States of Guernsey agreed to take over the cost of maintaining the roads and embankments from the Braye land owners upon payment of £114. Following the creation of the tomato industry in Guernsey in 1841, the growing industry expanded and areas of the Braye had greenhouses built on them.

To maintain the new roads, an annual charge of 2d (two pence) per perch (21 feet) of road frontage was levied. Carved granite mile stones, 60 in total in the whole Island, were installed on the main roads in 1823. The distances being measured from the Town Church.

== Current ==
Certain modern day reminders of the Braye still exist.

- The Vale pond, next to the Vale church, is the only remnant of the original waterway. Now a nature reserve.
- There is an area still called the “Saltpans” in the Braye.
- On the northern side of the Braye, a length of sea wall made of boulders with rings to tie boats up to can still be found. It is now a listed monument and a path has been made along it to link Braye Road with Folie Lane, a green lane. A plaque was unveiled on 15 July 2006, on the 200th anniversary, to commemorate the vision of Sir John Doyle as well as the engineering skills.
- Nocq Road is the location of the nocq or sluice at St Sampson’s

== See also ==
- Guernsey
- Vale, Guernsey
- Saint Sampson, Guernsey
