= Town Church, Guernsey =

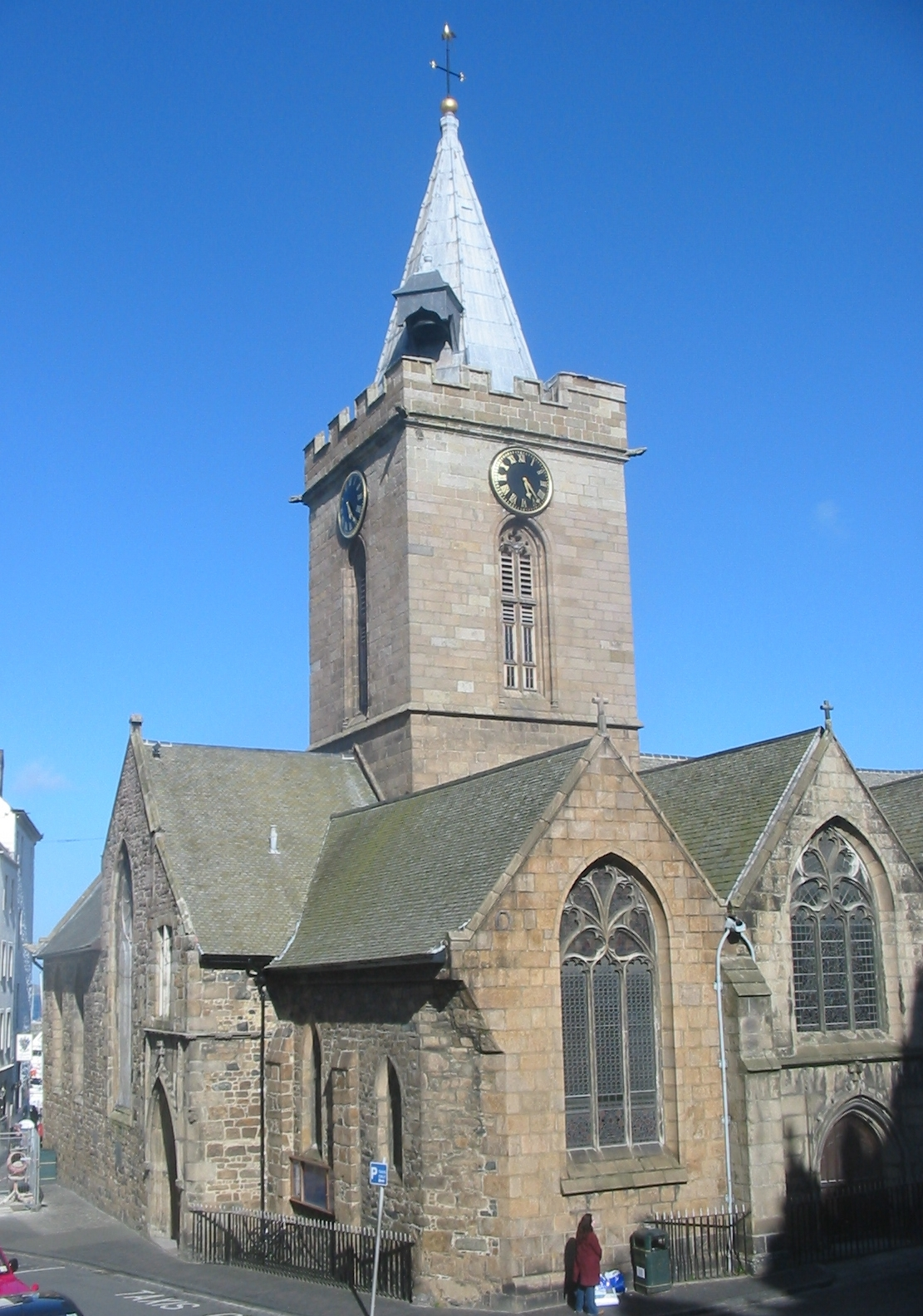
- Town Church, Guernsey

- Location in the Channel Islands
- 49°27′16.92″N 2°32′11.04″W
- Country: Channel Islands
- Denomination: Church of England, previously, Roman Catholic
- Website: www.townchurch.net

History
- Dedication: St. Peter

Architecture
- Heritage designation

Administration
- Province: Canterbury
- Diocese: Salisbury
- Archdeaconry: Channel Islands
- Deanery: Guernsey
- Benefice: Guernsey

Clergy
- Rector: Revd. Penny Graysmith
- Priest: Revd. Peter Graysmith

The Town Church is also known as the "Parish Church of St Peter Port", "Sancti Petri du Portu" and "Town Church of St Peter, Apostle & Martyr".

The earliest known religious building on the site was in 1020 with a reference to a small rectangular chapel; however, a building probably existed in the 8th century. The current building, probably started in the 13th century was completed in its current format by 1466.

The Town Church is considered the main island church so serves both the States of Deliberation and the Lieutenant Governor of Guernsey as well as the parishioners of Saint Peter Port.

Reverend Penny Graysmith was installed as Rector of the Town Church on 5th 2023. Reverend Penny made history by becoming the first woman to be appointed Vice-Dean in Guernsey, she was admitted during the evensong service on Sunday, 12 July 2020. Prior to becoming the rector at town Church, she was a chaplain at the Guernsey Prison.

Reverend Peter Graysmith is an Associate Priest.

The Churchwardens are Sarah Bamford (Rector's Warden) and Martin Priest (People's Warden).

The organist, Director of Music and Choirmaster is Stephen le Prevost who was, amongst other positions throughout his career, assistant organist at Westminster Abbey from 1991 to 2001.

== History ==
A church referred to as "Sancti Petri du Portu Mari" in 1048, may be a reference to the chapel on the site first recorded in 1020, was given to the Benedictine Abbey of Marmoutier by the Duke of Normandy. The Island was divided into parishes in the 11th century and the Town Church became the parish church for Saint Peter Port.

There is a granite carving of a spaniel's head – probably a mason's mark, and of the same design as one at the Vale Church.

In 1135, the church was described as standing next to a mill which was in the churchyard. By 1250, the current church building had replaced the earlier chapel, it had two transepts that were used as chapels.

The earliest record of a rector of the parish is Pierre Le Valleys in 1282. The church's roof was destroyed in 1305 and the rebuilt church was consecrated on 1 August 1312 at which time two chapels were in use dedicated to St. Julien and St. Jacques. The Bishop of Coutances, Robert de Harcourt, officiated, guests included the Abbot of Mont St Michel and the governors of Caen, Cherbourg and Southampton.

Between 1466 and 1473 the church, including the spire, and the stair turret was completed in the main format that we see today.

The break from the Catholic faith by Henry VIII of England resulted in the control of the church moving from the Diocese of Coutances to Winchester, this was followed by a return to Catholicism with Mary I of England in 1553 and the occurrence of a notorious event, the Guernsey Martyrs where the three women were tried by the Ecclesiastical Court in the Town Church in 1556. Elizabeth I of England became the Protestant Queen in 1558.

The change to Presbyterian rule in 1563 saw changes to the practices in church as well as the removal of frescos and ornamentation. There were also 100 people on the Island during this period who were burned at the stake, hanged, branded or flogged after being accused of witchcraft. Noisy behaviour inside or outside the church was punished with a spell in the stocks set up in Town Church Square.

The church has been Anglican since 1662 when the book of Common Prayer was translated into French on the orders of King Charles II of England for use in the Channel Islands.

Services over the centuries were originally conducted in Latin, then French, then a mixture of French and English and only in the last century, mainly in English. It is now a tradition to hold worship services in the Town Church at Easter and Christmas in both Latvian and English.

== Building ==
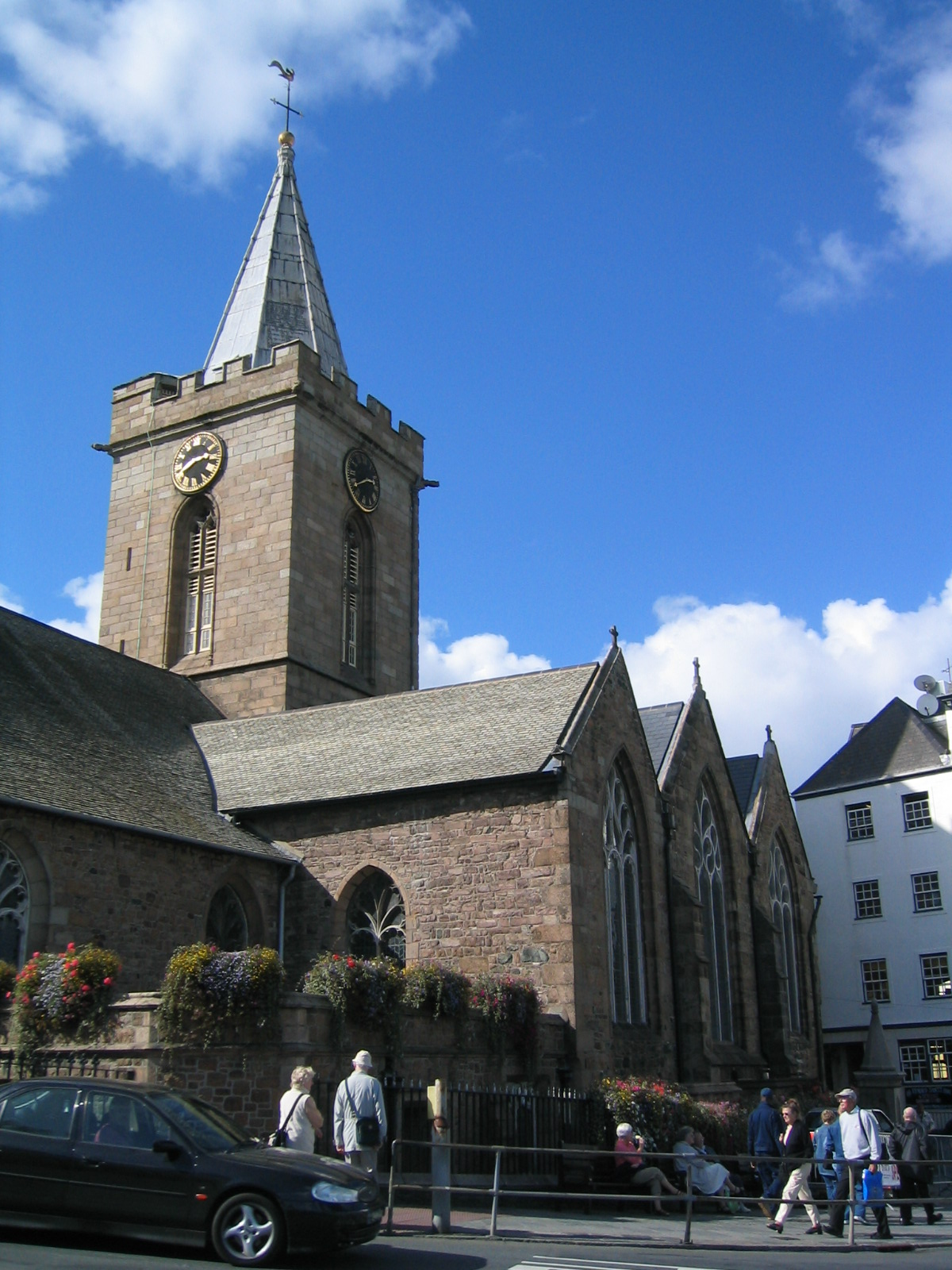
St Peter Port Church

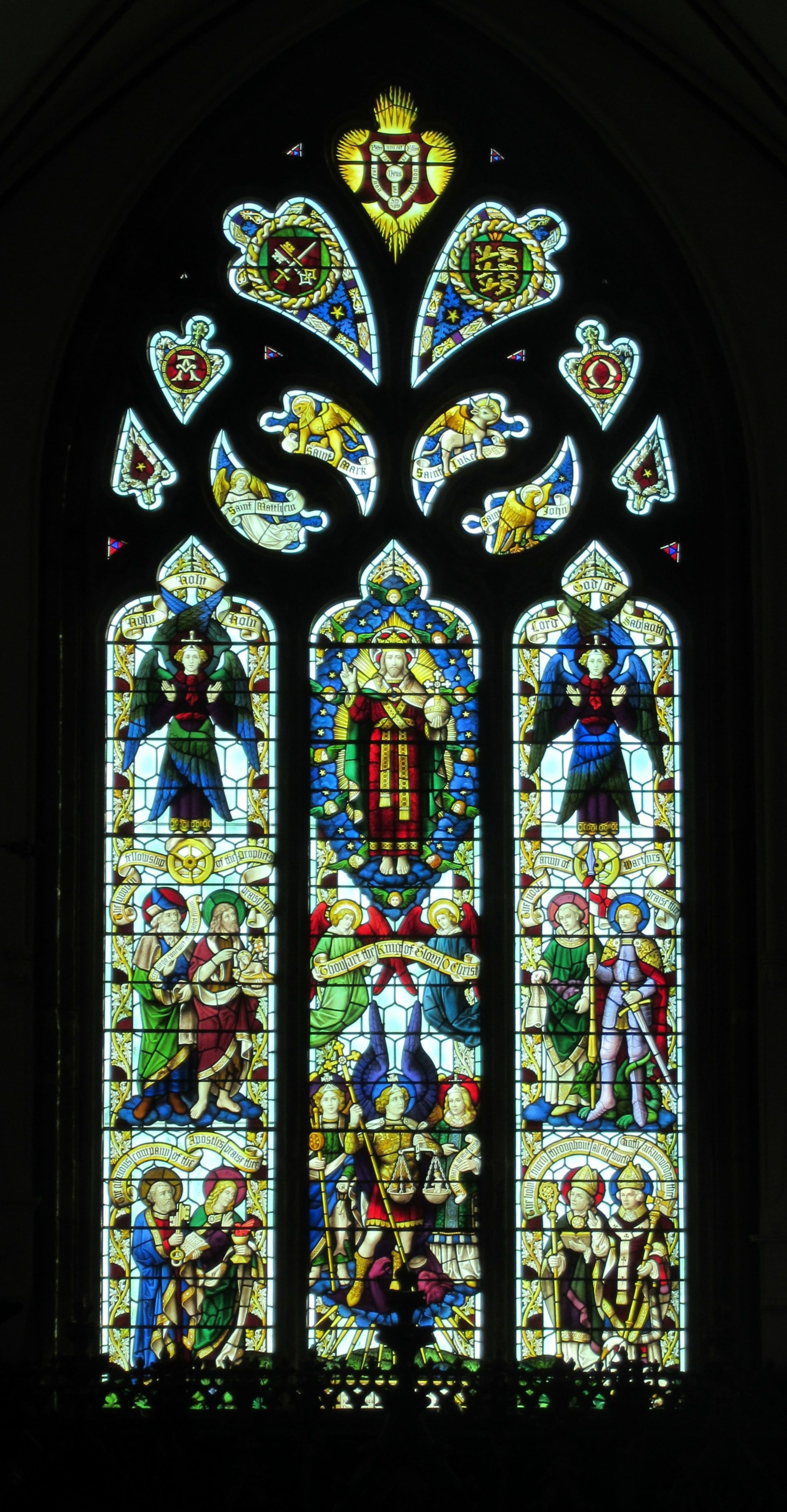
Stained-glass window in the church

Located at the end of a valley on the seafront, on the original southern edge of the town, the building was close to, or on top of earlier Roman buildings that would have used the spring in Fountain Street.

The church, which had been damaged by fire started by invaders, had to be rebuilt in the early 14th century. Around 1420 the present chancel and tower crossing with chapels and aisles to the north and south were completed.

The south transept was begun around 1450 and completed in 1466, having been built around the churchyard, the only space available. Additional works were completed by 1473, with the porch added around 1500. The nave, tower and chancel are out of alignment, possible due to the cramped site on which the church is built.

A stone, one of ‘’Les Barrieres de la Ville’’ were erected in 1700 against the church cemetery to the east of the church, to mark the boundary of the town which extended north. The quay to the east was built in the 18th century, necessitating the demolition of some old houses and opening up the view of the church from the sea.

A major renovation in 1822-6 saw the opening up of previously blocked windows and the Lady Chapel with the removal of the upper floor Ecclesiastical Court room, the relocation of the organ and the installation of a suspended plaster and lath ceiling. The rectory, located in what is now Market Street, was sold and demolished.

There were medieval houses and a mill close to the west of the church that were demolished between 1830 and 1870 to extend the market, create a square and let Fountain Street reach the quay. Queen Victoria and Prince Albert landing from the Royal Yacht on the quay in front of the church in August 1846.

In 1882 further renovation works were undertaken providing the current pews, Caen stone pulpit and Italian marble font as well as moving the organ to its present location.

The roof was renovated and restored in 2006–7 with the electrics and a new sound system being installed in 2009.

An entry in the Guinness World Records records the building as being the closest church to a pub in Great Britain, the distance being just 18 inches.

=== Tower and bells ===
The tower was completed around 1466 with the octagonal tower, topped with a ball and weathercock, dating from 1721. The hexagonal staircase turret has the oldest door in the Channel Islands inside it.

1736 saw a new set of 8 recast bells installed in the recently completed steeple. The clock bell, fastened in an external belfry dates from 1736. In 1782 a mechanical clock was installed with its four faces on the tower.

Eight new bells were cast in Villedieu-les-Poêles, France, in 1913 and mounted on the existing 1736 oak frames. Unfortunately, the French bell foundry did not appreciate the hanging requirements for English change-ringing and the bells proved so difficult to ring that they fell into disuse. In 1994, the bells were re-cast and re-hung by Taylor's of Loughborough. The new ring of 8 bells was dated 1995 to celebrate the 50th anniversary of the liberation of Guernsey from German occupation, hence the name The Liberation Bells. They are the heaviest ring of bells in the Channel Islands, the tenor being 21- 1 – 12 cwt.

=== Organ ===
An organ, possibly by John Lincoln, was installed in 1811. In 1874 the organ was under repair by Joseph Robson of London. Despite this the organ was reconstructed by Maley, Young and Oldknow and reopened in 1877 and comprised 3 manuals and pedals with 21 speaking stops and a spare slide on the Swell. During this reconstruction it was moved to the north side of the choir from the old organ loft which was then demolished. The trumpet stop was replaced with another by Mr Oldknow in 1887. Three stops were added to the swell in 1888 and he also added a 16 ft pedal reed in 1895

A later expansion increased the number of speaking stops to 27 and by 1952 this was 29 speaking stops. A specification of the organ from 1952 can be found on the National Pipe Organ Register.

=== Damage ===
The church has received damage from wars over the years. In 1294 and again in 1305 attacks by French forces badly damaged the church.

The English Civil War saw the church in the firing line in 1643 between the Royalist held Castle Cornet and the Parliamentarian held town. Cannonballs fired from the castle caused some damage to the church.

The Second World War saw the town bombed, first by German bombers in June 1940 and later by Allied bombers which caused damage to the glass in the town, in particular 8 Hawker Typhoon aircraft flown by No. 263 Squadron RAF attack on German submarine U-275, in the harbour on 14 June 1944 shattered most of stained glass windows in the church.

== Military connections ==
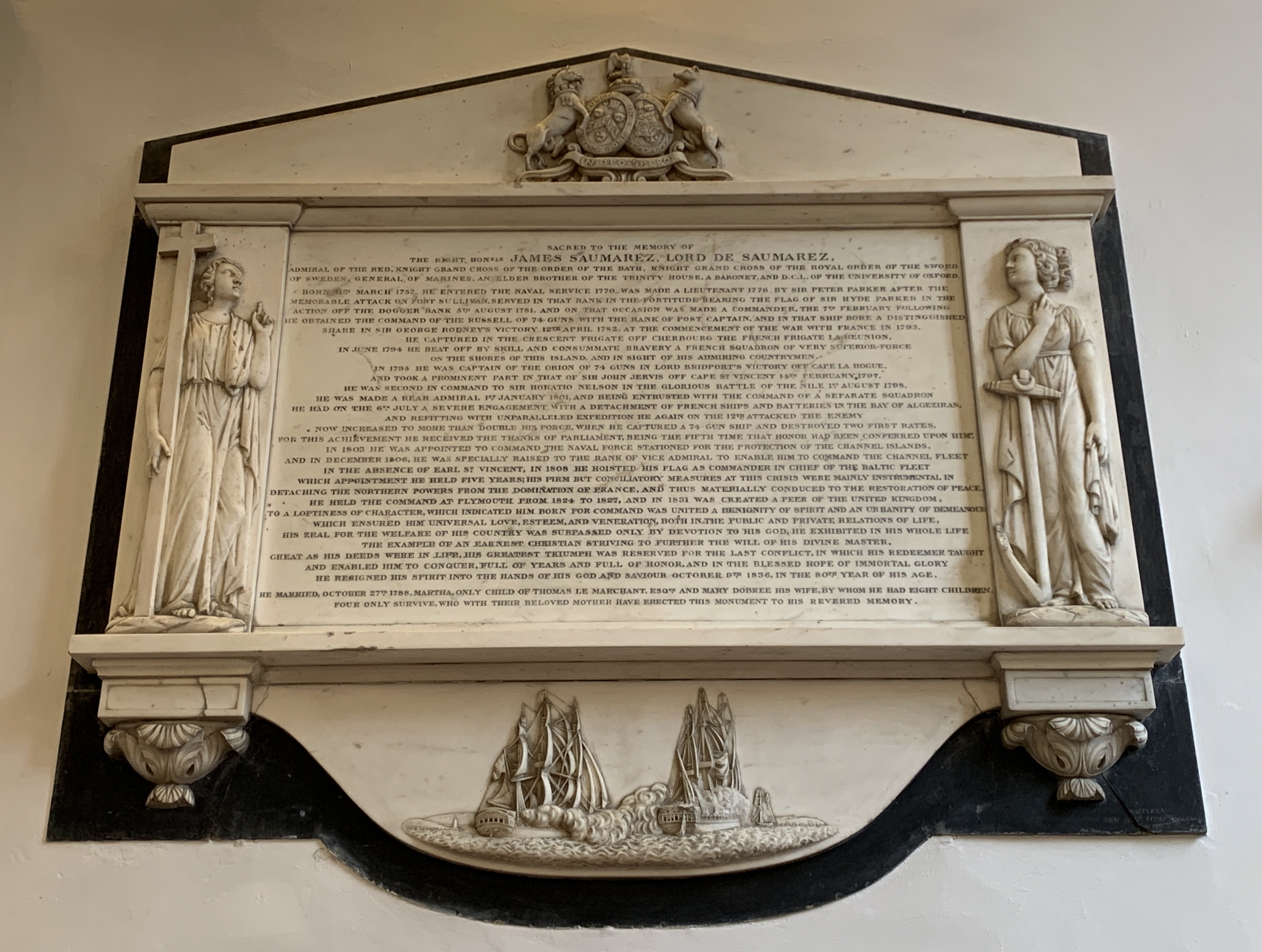
Memorial to James Saumarez, 1st Baron de Saumarez by William Whitelaw

The church was the Island garrison church, for both militia and British garrison regiments for many centuries. It was used to store the artillery for the town militia from 1768, and also for the town fire engine until both were evicted in 1822.

The regimental colours of the Town Regiment of the Royal Guernsey Militia are hung in the Church, the militia was formed in 1337 and disbanded over 600 years later, in 1946.

The colours of the Royal Guernsey Light Infantry which was formed to serve during the first world war, displaying their battle honours, are also hung in the church.

The island has a strong connection with the sea and there are a number of memorials to naval officers, such as Admiral de Sausmarez. A plaque to Major General Sir Isaac Brock, "The Hero of Upper Canada", is fitted to the outside of the church.

During the 1940–1945 occupation, German soldiers attended services, the German Commandant agreeing that "assemblies in churches for the purpose of Divine Worship are permitted. Prayers for the Royal Family and the British Empire may be said".

Commemoration services are regularly held at the Church, especially on 9 May, Guernsey's liberation day and on the Sunday closest to 11 November.

== Births, marriages and deaths ==
The church records were held within the church until 1799 and show baptisms from 1563; marriages from 1565 and burials from 1566.

There was almost no space for burials near the church, the Cimitière des Soeurs, or Sisters' Cemetery was located on rising ground to the south of the Church, a Cimetière des Frères or Brothers' Cemetery being located north of town and burials in the church vaults causing unpleasant odors within the church. It was necessary to recycle graves regularly.

In 1780 a Cimitière des Étrangers, or Strangers' Cemetery, was created, near Elizabeth College. This was superseded in 1830 by the Candie Cemetery, although paupers of the Parish continued to be buried at the Strangers Cemetery until 1880.

== Annual events ==
The church hosts a number of charity and music events throughout the year, including youth music, organ and choral recitals.

The annual church-to-church competition, where competitors have to touch each Guernsey parish church in a 19.4 mile race is a special Guernsey event attracting world class competitors starts and finishes at the Town Church.

== Protected Building ==
The Parish Church of St. Peter Port, the island site upon which it stands and the walls, railings and gates which encompass it, and the Town Barriere, steps, railings together with the associated paved area extending into Church Square situated at the Quay and bordered to the north by Albion House and to the south-west by the Town Church were listed as a Protected Building by the States of Guernsey on 23 November 1970, reference PB712.

== See also ==
- List of churches, chapels and meeting halls in the Channel Islands
