= Vavasseur =

Vavasseur, a surname of French origin, once characterised a "vassal of a vassal", i.e., a sub-vassal - someone holding land not from the Crown directly but from a vassal of the Crown (cf. fr:Vavasseur). Notable people with the surname include:

- Didier Vavasseur (born 1961), French sprint canoer
- François Vavasseur (1605–1681), French Jesuit humanist and controversialist
- Henry Vavasseur, British entrepreneur who discovered how to make desiccated coconut in 1888
- Josiah Vavasseur (1834–1908), English industrialist
- Sophie Vavasseur (born 1992), Irish actress

== See also ==
- Vavasseur mounting, for artillery and machine guns
- Vavasour (disambiguation)
  - Vavasour (surname)
