= The Vale Church, Guernsey =

Coordinates: 49.493°N 2.539°W

St. Michel du Valle is the parish church of Vale, Guernsey.

== Early history of the Church ==
In January 1949 an Early Christian monument was unearthed outside the West door of the church. This stone dates from the 7th or 8th century. It is now situated outside the Baptistry, resting against the wall. This stone points to the presence of a Christian community on this site, somewhere about A.D.600. It is possible that there was a Christian community in the Vale at an even earlier date. A chapel, dedicated to St Magloire, stood in the Vale. St Magloire was a nephew of St Samson of Dol, and was born about the year 535. The chapel in his name was mentioned in a bull of Pope Adrian IV as being in the patronage of Mont Saint-Michel, in Normandy; all traces of the chapel have gone. While the chapel would probably be of a much later date, St Magloire, the British missionary, may well have set up a centre of Christian worship before A.D. 600.

== The Priory ==
Somewhere around A.D. 968, monks, from the Benedictine monastery of Mont Saint-Michel, came to Guernsey to establish a community in the North of the Island. It is likely that at one time a land bridge connected the two sections next to the Vale church, before the sea broke through. In 1204 it is reported that the Royal Court of Guernsey visited the Braye du Valle to replace boundary markers that had been washed away. This area of Guernsey would form a separate island at high tide, and continued to do so until 1806. The Priory of Mont Saint-Michel was a dependency of the famous Abbey of Mont Saint-Michel. The last remaining stonework is a piece of buttressed wall to the South of the church, by the roadside.

According to tradition, Robert II, Duke of Normandy (the father of William the Conqueror) was journeying to England in 1032, to help Edward the Confessor. He was obliged to take shelter in Guernsey and gave land, now known as the Clos du Valle, to the monks. Furthermore, in 1061, when pirates attacked and pillaged the Island, a complaint was made to Duke William. He sent over Sampson D'Anneville, who succeeded, with the aid of the monks, in driving the pirates out. For this service, Sampson D' Anneville and the monks were rewarded with a grant of half the Island between them. The portion going to the monastery being known as Le Fief St Michel, and included the parishes of St Saviour, St Pierre du Bois, Ste. Marie du Catel, and the Vale. The castle of Saint Michael or as it is now called "Vale Castle" was constructed to protect the population against pirates by providing a safe refuge. In 1117 there was a large ceremony to celebrate the finalisation of major works.

The Priory had the largest feudal court of all the Seigneuries, consisting of a Seneschal, eleven Vavasseurs, a Greffier (registrar), six Bordiers, and a Batonnier (wand-bearer).

The official Seal of the Fief represented the Archangel Michael trampling Satan underfoot.

The Court of the Priory was only second to the Royal Court of Guernsey in importance, and retained its jurisdiction until 1862.

Although the Priors lived alongside the church there is nothing to show whether they themselves ministered to the spiritual needs of the parishioners, or whether they appointed Vicars.

In 1249, Henry, Canon of Blanchelande, was collated to the Vale Church by special dispensation, as they could not find a secular priests to accept the charge. This would imply that secular priests usually fulfilled this duty.

After 1312, the then Prior of the Vale, Guillaume Le Fievre, became Abbot of Mont Saint-Michel, in Normandy. The Priory was still functioning in 1478, though no longer under the Benedictine Order, and a Franciscan friar was appointed by Edward IV.

== The parish church ==
The site of the church makes it a landmark for seafarers, and from many points in the North of the Island one can glimpse this building. Prior to 1806 the church was reached by boat at high tide, the Braye du Valle being navigable for small craft.

The present church, built alongside the Priory, was dedicated in 1117, and belongs to the parish. The Priory fell into disuse about 1414, some of its timbers being used to repair Castle Cornet.

The church bears traces of monastic work in its architecture, the mouldings and capitals. Another feature of the monastic influence is the irregularity of the layout. No angles are square, no walls are parallel, and the main axis of the Chancel is out of line with the main axis of the Nave. This deviation is well-known, being attributed to a desire to recall the tortured body of Jesus on the cross.

On the South wall, near the Chancel, is a piscina, one of four in the building.

On the granite arch above the pulpit is the carving of a spaniel's head - probably a mason's mark, and of the same design as one at the Town Church.

The masonry of the windows on the North side, like the doorways at the West, forms curious hood moulds, to be seen from the outside of the buildings.

In 1555, Thomas de Beaugy, previously Priest of Lihou, was in possession of the living of the Vale; he was the last Roman Catholic Curé on the Island and was present at the Court of Chief Pleas in 1572.

In 1585, a Protestant minister from France was appointed. In 1607, the Pastor of St Sampson took charge of both parishes, and from this time the parishes continued to be united under the care of the same Minister, whose official title was Rector of S. Sampson's and Vicar of the Vale.

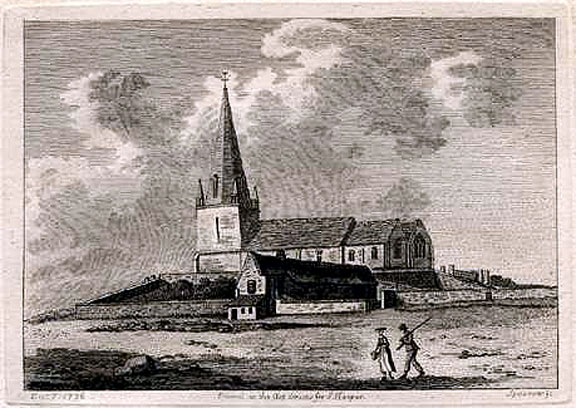
1776 Vale Church

In 1859, the Crown ordered that the two parishes be held separately. The Rev. Thomas Bell, M.A., who had been a Curate of the Vale, became Rector (1853–1914).

The mosaic reredos was erected in 1904 by the parishioners as a mark of esteem for Thomas Bell's 50th year in the parish;he added another 10 years.

Some of the services of the church were in the French language until the 1920s.

The parishes in Guernsey were part of the Diocese of Coutances, Normandy, until the latter part of the 15th century, and were then transferred to the Diocese of Salisbury, and then to the Diocese of Winchester soon afterwards, where they remain.

At the end of the last century, a Mission Church was provided for the parish, and in 1923a Church Hall.

=== Recent Additions ===
The window over the Altar at the Parish Church, dedicated by the Dean to the memory of the late Mr. J. H. Ingrouille (1920–1945), son of Mr. and Mrs. J. A. Ingrouille, of La Miellette, Vale.

During the Occupation, Mr. Ingrouille, Jr., was sentenced to imprisonment by the Nazis for five years of which he served four years in various prisons, the last being Brandenburg-Görden, Germany. He was found by a British Army officer and sent to hospital in Brussels where he died on 13 June 1945. In 1946 his body was brought to Guernsey and buried in the Domaille Cemetery at the Vale church.

A stained glass window in memory of Mr. and Mrs. A. J. Robin was placed on the south side in 1963. Blue carpets, curtains, and cushions have been provided by the members of the Mothers' Union, and carpeting in the North aisle.

In 1966 the heating system was completely replaced by a gas-fired boiler and radiators. Also in 1966 the old slates were removed from the roof, and rafters, felting and new slates supplied: The work continued into 1967. The Vestry roof needed all new timbers and slates.

=== The Bells ===
Whatever bells there were originally were replaced in the sixteenth century with three bells cast by the Exeter bell foundry, the tenor is said to have weighed about 14 cwt. These were hung in the base of the spire. They were rung from the ground floor or perhaps the former gallery at the back of the church. Their inscriptions are given in Latin on the brass plate on the tower pillar and explain, in French, the reason for their gift by the Rector, The Rev'd. Thomas A. Bell who became Rector of the Vale in 1859, and continued in that post until his death in 1914, by which time he was the oldest active clergyman in the Anglican Church. His son Arthur was born in 1852 and became a surgeon, but died at Digby's, near Exeter in 1889, and the present bells were given in his memory by his parents.

The inscription reads:

Eglise de S. Michel-du-Valle ~ Paques 1891 Cette Eglise possedait autrefois trois cloches d'une date tres ancienne, mais inconnue, elles portaient les inscriptions suivantes:

1. Me melior vere non est compana sub ere. 2. Est mihi collatum Jesu istud nomen amatum. 3. Plebs omnis plaudit ut me tam sepius audit.

En 1891 elles on ete refondues, et avec addition de nouveau metal, six cloches ont ete placees dans Ie clocher de cette eglise + une chambre pour les sonneurs a ete aussi construite, et d'autres travaux ont ete faits, pour faciliter l'entree au clocher. Les frais pour les nouvelles cloches et pour les susdits travaux ont ete fournis par Le Reverend Thomas Bell, M.A., Recteur de cette paroisse et Chanoine honoraire de la Cathedrale de Winchester, et par Blanche Henrietta Lihou sa femme, qui ont fait cette offrande, a la gloire de Dieu, et qui desirent que ces cloches gardent la memoire de leur fils bienaime, Thomas Arthur Bell, qui est mort a Digbys, pres de la Ville d'Exeter Ie7Avril 1889, age de 36 ans.

Note Date cwts. qtrs. Ibs Tenor B flat 1891 6 2 23 5th C 1891 5 1 19 4thD 1891 4 2 17 3rd E flat 1891 3 3 12 2ndF 1891 3 2 12 Treble G 1891 3 2 13

The six new bells, the largest weighing 63,4cwt in B flat, all have the inscription "RECAST BY JOHN WARNER & SONS LONDON 1891". They are hung for ringing in the base of the spire in a frame of iron castings bolted to timber foundation beams, probably the same beams which supported the old bells. In 1970 the bells were sent to the Whitechapel Bell Foundry to be retuned and rehung with new bearings and pulleys. In the year 2000 the bells were again removed from the frame so that it and the bell fittings could be refurbished. Two rolled steel joists were installed to provide additional support to the bellframe.

In 1891 Dean Bell had provided a ringing chamber below the bells, reached by the iron ladder up the outside of the church -not a pleasant approach on wet or windy days. However, in 1976 the ringers were moved to the ground floor, the bells are now rung in the presence of the congregation from around the font. Several peals have been rung on the bells, the first in 1959 by a band from England. The first by local band was rung in 1980 as an 80th birthday compliment to Queen Elizabeth the Queen Mother.

=== The church clock ===
The clock with four faces was installed in the spire above the bells, in 1898 to commemorate Queen Victoria's Diamond Jubilee the previous year. Originally driven by weights, it was electrified in 1970. It has Westminster chimes and strikes the hours.

Installation photograph of the Vale Church clock 1898. Coll. Christian Corbet, Canada.

== Church records ==
The Church possesses records going back to 1580, though the earliest are in poor condition. The entries are in French up to 1939.

All the Registers that were needing preservation or repair were sent to an Archivist in England for careful attention. The work was completed in 1970.

== Miscellaneous ==
A complete set of Vestments were presented to the Church in 1967. A Cope, known as 'the Agnus Dei' Cope, was presented to the Church in 1970.

Two chalices, dated 1794, "Pour le service de L'Eglise du Valle." One chalice, late 19th century. Two patens and two salvers, 1794. Two flagons, 1860 and 1936. One ciborium, 1966. The parish is very poor as regards ancient vessels, this is accounted for by the fact that S. Sampson's and the Vale were united for two centuries. When the division took place, the old plate remained with S. Sampson's.

Since 1967, a Chalice a Ciborium, and a Wafer Box, all in solid silver, have been presented to the Church; also a Ciborium for use at the Mission Church.

The lectern was presented to the Church by the Dean, The Rev'd Thomas Bell on the occasion of his golden wedding anniversary.

In 2007 the first ever fine art exhibition of paintings and sculptures was held in the Church. The exhibition was of the work of noted Canadian artist Christian Corbet a descendant of the Vale. Corbet donated 100% of all sales to the Church which exceeded over £5,000. The exhibition was officially opened by the Bailiff of Guernsey Geoffrey Rowland and the Vice Dean of Guernsey Rev. Kevin Charles Northover.

In 2007 Christian Corbet also donated the first ever bronze art medallion into the Church coll. entitled "St. Michael and His Sword".

== The Occupation ==
Owing to evacuation and deportation during the German Occupation of the Channel Islands, the number of Anglican clergy in the Island became reduced. The Rector of S. Michel du Valle was deported in 1942; his duties being taken over by the then Rector of St. Sampson's, giving him four churches in his care.

To cope with the situation, members of the laity officiated at services throughout the Island. One of those to be enlisted was Mr Harold Brache, our Licensed Reader.

Because of shortages of fuel for light and heat, and owing to the curfew, Evensong was held between the hours of 2.30-4.00 p.m. No Confirmations could take place during 1941-1944.

Vice Dean of Guernsey, Kevin Charles Northover b.1957

== Priors of the Vale, Vicars of the Vale and Rectors of St Sampson ==
1156 Robert, pretre et Doyen du Valle
1179 Richard, de Vyville (Huivilla), Prior
1249 Henry, Canon of Blanchelande
1306 Jean de la Port (Duport), afterwards Abbot of Mont Saint-Michel
1323 Jean Le Caretier
1324 Renant Pastey
1325 William Fabri (Guillaume Le Febre)
1327 Jourdain Poingdestre
1335 Andre de la Porte (Duport)
1352 Richard Tyffanye
1364 Geoffrey de Carteret
1368 Jean de Guerin
1372 Brefard (time of descente des Saragousais)
1479 Guillaume Paul

=== Rectors of the Vale ===
1473 Jean Le Carpentier
1480 Jean Bequerel
1490 Jean Corneille
1497 Pierre Houssaye, died 1503
1503 George Elys, Doyen 1509, Resigned 1513
1513 Jean de Quetteville
1550 Jean Hurt
1555 Thomas de Beaugy
1585 Jean de Cherpont, d. 1587
1587 Noel Perruquet
1590 Jacques Guyneau, d. 1592
1592 Jean Marchand
1598 Jeremy Valpy, d. 1606
1606 Pierre Painsec
1607 Nicholas Efart
1607 Thomas Miletjun
16-Jean Boulon
1652 Thomas Piquot, d. 1604
1655 Thomas Le Marchant, resigned 1662
1662 Philip Brashmart, d. 1663

=== Vicars of the Vale and Rectors of St Sampson ===
1663 Elie des Hayes, d.1710
1665 Nicholas Noe
1687 Pierre Bely, d. 1710
1711 Nicholas Le Mesurier, d. 1721
1722 François Duplessis, d. 1729
1730 Thomas Williams
1743 Joseph du Queray, d. 1743
1743 François de Baupin, d. 1751
1752 François Guillaume Durand, d. 1789
1763 Jean Charles Bernel
1767 Daniel François Durand
1774 Rene Martineau
1780 Gabriel François Guyneau
1789 Rene Martineau, d. 1816
1816 William John Chepmell

=== Rectors of the Vale ===
1859 Thomas Bell, Dean of Guernsey 1892, d.1917
1915 Frederick William Stamp Le Lievre, d.1939
1939 Grotius Alexander James, d.1961
1959 Kenneth Claude Cadman
1965 John Raymond Hancock, d.2000
1979 Peter Simpson
1992 Edward John Widdows
2000 Kevin Northover
2018 On 11 February 2018 it was announced that the Revd Stuart Tanswell, Vicar of St John the Evangelist, North Holmwood, was to be the next Rector of the Vale Church. He will be licensed as Priest in Charge on Wednesday 11 April before being inducted as Rector on Thursday 14 June 2018.
