= Maritime history of the Channel Islands =

The Channel Islands are a group of islands off the coast of France. The largest island is Jersey, followed by Guernsey, Alderney, Sark, and a number of smaller islands, islets and rocky outcrops. The islands were separated from mainland Europe with rising sea levels in the Neolithic period; thereafter maritime activity commenced.

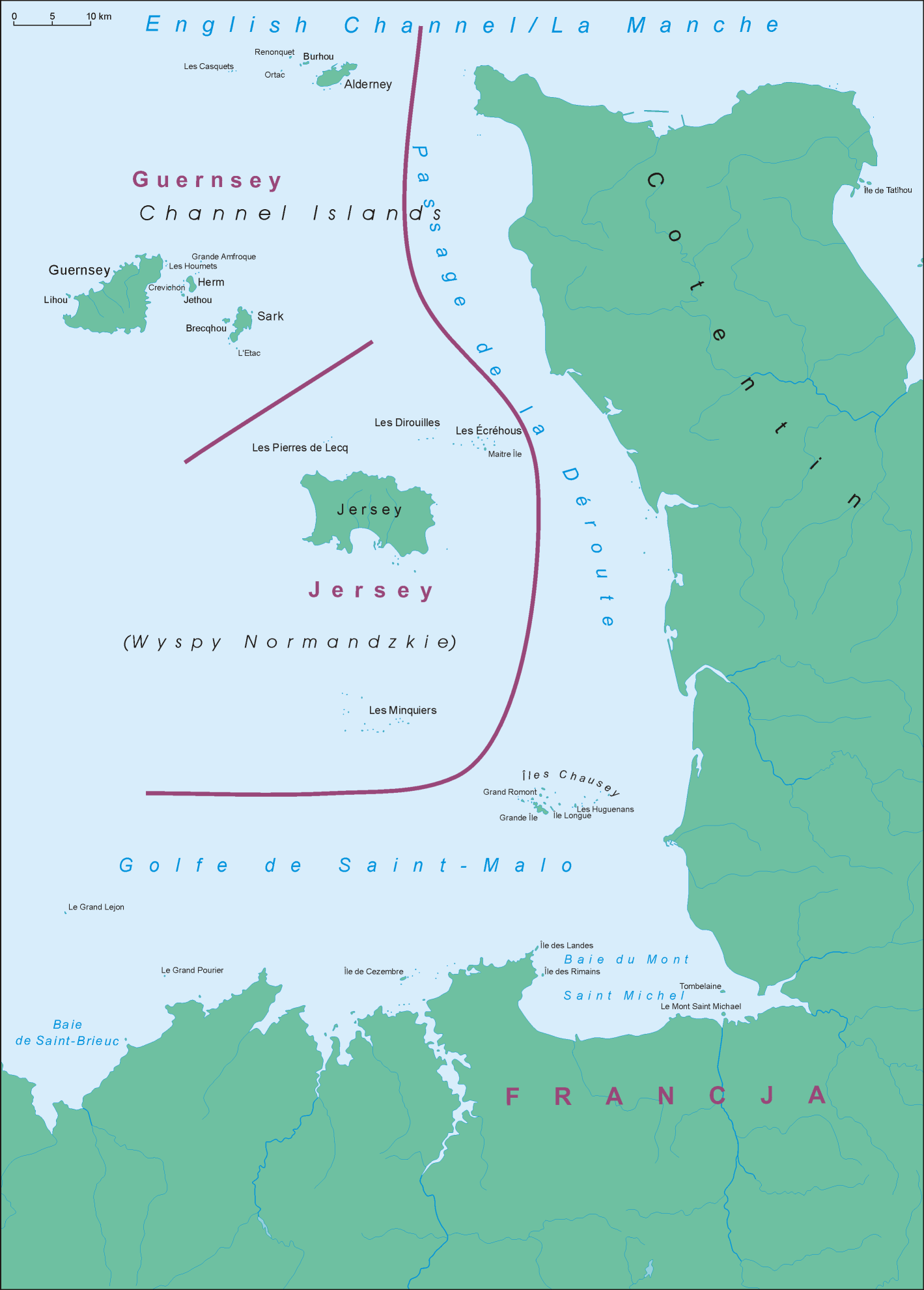
The Channel Islands

Needing to trade, the islanders were innovative. Over time they built up skills, earning money and investing capital in maritime businesses.

== Timeline ==
=== Stone Age and Bronze Age ===
The presence of Statue menhirs on the islands, such as at St Martin's church on Guernsey and the burial mound at La Hougue Bie, Jersey, give evidence of populations either living on or visiting the islands. Guernsey and Alderney were separated from mainland Europe around 7000 BC with Jersey sometime after, but even at 4000 BC the islands were close enough to the mainland coast for primitive boats to move between the islands.

=== Iron Age ===
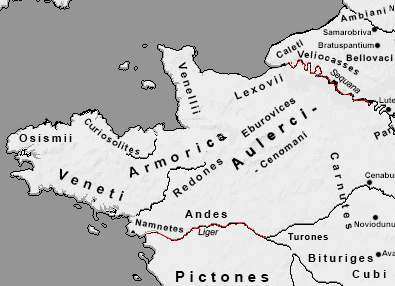
The Roman geographical area of Armorica. The Seine and Loire are marked in red.

Archaeological evidence of trade from the Iron Age period is in evidence in the Islands, with goods manufactured on the western coast such as armlets, Breton pottery and amphorae from the Mediterranean indicating trade along the Atlantic coast from Iberia to Ireland. Armorica was the nearest trade zone.

=== Roman ===
Hoards such as the 70,000 coins found in the Grouville Hoard have been discovered, although their reason for being in Jersey is open to speculation.

Roman settlements on the islands show evidence of an intricate trading network with regional and long-distance trade from 120 BC after the Romans occupied southern Gaul, especially using Guernsey where amphorae from the Herculaneum area and Spain have been found. Buildings found in La Plaiderie, St Peter Port, dating from 100 to 400 AD appear to be warehouses.

The earliest evidence of shipping was the discovery of a wreck in Saint Peter Port Harbour of a ship, which has been named "Asterix". It is thought to be a 3rd-century Roman cargo vessel, and was probably at anchor or grounded when the fire broke out.

The presence of a Roman fort/signal station at the Nunnery in Alderney adds to the evidence of trade.

=== Early Middle Ages ===
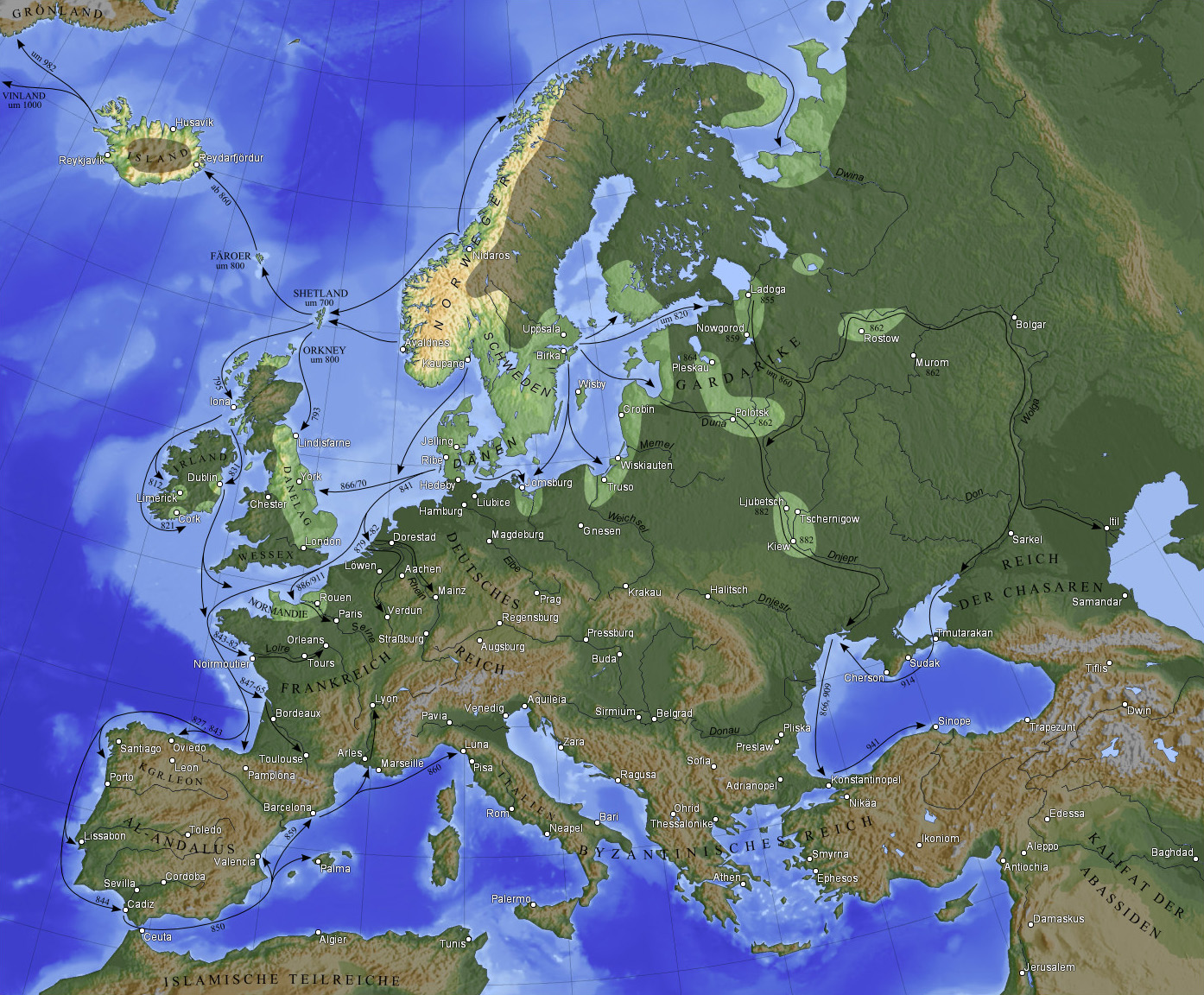
Travels of the Vikings

The arrival of Christianity including Samson of Dol, Helier, Marcouf and Magloire shows the rise in regular shipping to and from the islands in the 6th century.

Piracy/raiding especially by Vikings took place throughout this era. The Viking leader Rollo besieged Paris in 911, resulting in the islands, formerly under the control the Duchy of Brittany, being annexed by the Duchy of Normandy in 933.

=== High Middle Ages ===
The islands now became part of the trade routes of the Vikings. From 1066, trade with England expanded.

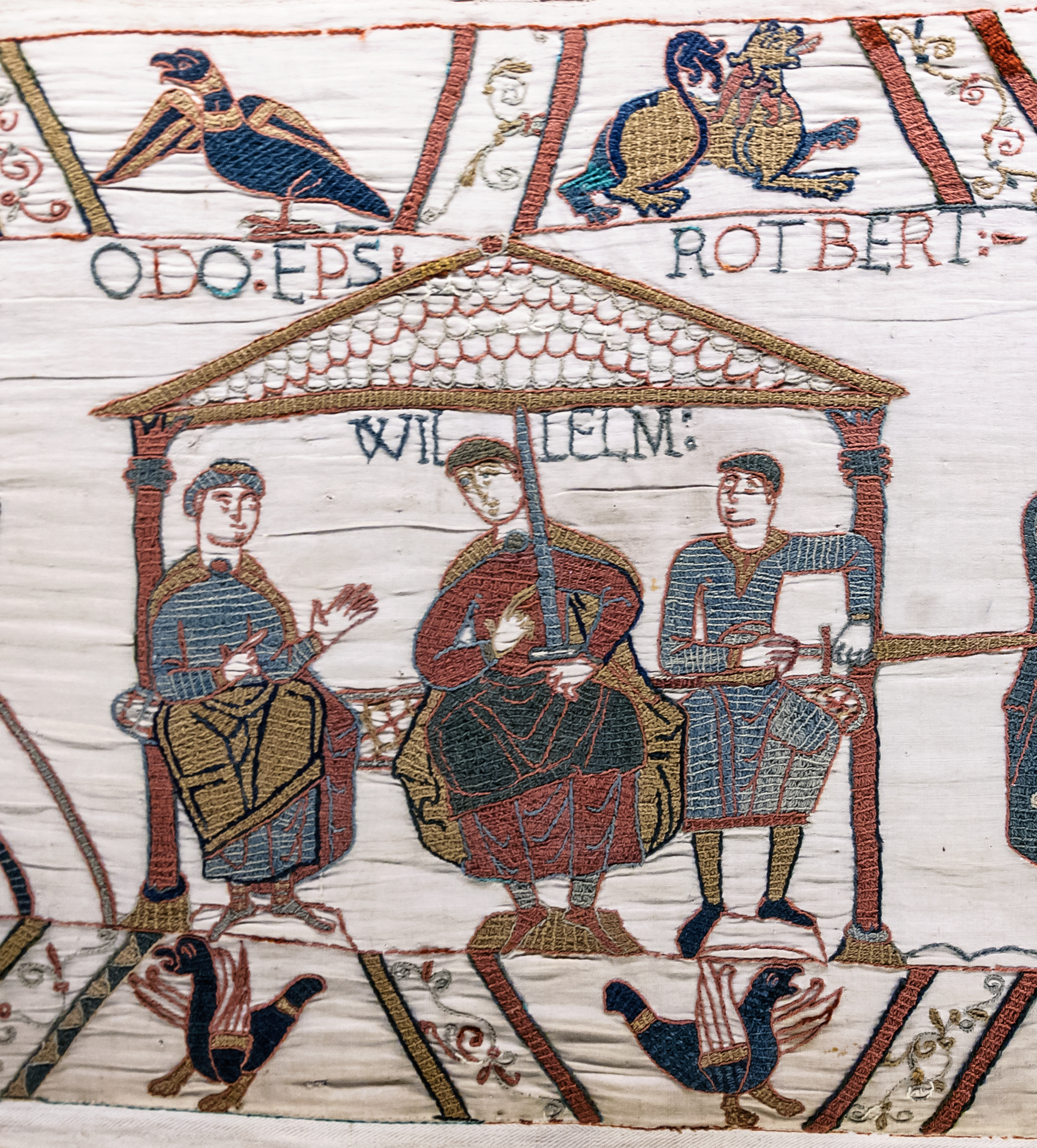
The Bayeux Tapestry (detail) showing William the Conqueror (centre), his half-brothers Robert, Count of Mortain (right) and Odo, Bishop of Bayeux in the Duchy of Normandy (left)

The era ended with the loss by King John in 1204 of French territories of Normandy, putting the islands in the front line of the wars between England and France that would last for 700 years. They elected to stay with the English inheritor of the Duke of Normandy title, so severing, in times of war, the trade route to France, except for religious trade, as churches were linked to Coutances until 1568.

Needing to survive by trade and not forming part of England, they were allowed, which was confirmed by subsequent monarchs, to have self-determination and trade concessions as a means of ensuring loyalty to the English crown and providing trained militia forces to defend the islands. A 13th-century list of Guernsey ships shows ten, varying between 13 and 80 tons. In 1329–30, 487 ships paid tax in Guernsey on landed cargo, a number of them were engaged in the Bordeaux wine trade.

The exiled David II of Scotland raided Guernsey in 1336 and 1337. In 1338, Jersey was captured; Guernsey was occupied in 1339 by the French Capetians, holding the island for two years and Castle Cornet for seven. In 1372 Guernsey was again attacked, this time by Owain Lawgoch, followed by Jersey in the 1380s. These invasions were all repulsed, but resulted in improvements to defences against seaborne attack as well as strengthening the island militias in Guernsey, Jersey and Alderney.

Occasionally Channel Island ships were required to transport men and material across the channel when English kings wished to attack France. This era was an age of piracy during times of peace, with French ships during times of war attacking all maritime trade.

=== Early Modern ===
Covering the period from the 15th to the late 18th centuries, the era saw trade increase with the technical improvement in ships and navigation, and the ability to sail out of sight of land for days on end, until the end of the Napoleonic Wars.

In 1461 France invaded Jersey, capturing Mont Orgueil Castle. In 1468 it was recaptured, using the local militia. In gratitude, Edward IV issued Letters Patent exempting Jerseymen from all tolls, customs and subsidies payable to the Crown in England and granting commercial privileges to the Guernsey and Jersey men who had funded the fight.

As part of the peace between England and France, Pope Sixtus IV issued in 1483 a Papal bull granting the Privilege of Neutrality, by which the islands, their harbours and seas, as far as the eye can see, were considered neutral territory. Anyone molesting islanders would be excommunicated. A Royal Charter in 1548 confirmed the neutrality. The French attempted to invade Jersey a year later in 1549 but were defeated by the Jersey militia. The neutrality lasted another century, until William III of England abolished the privilege due to privateering activity against Dutch ships.

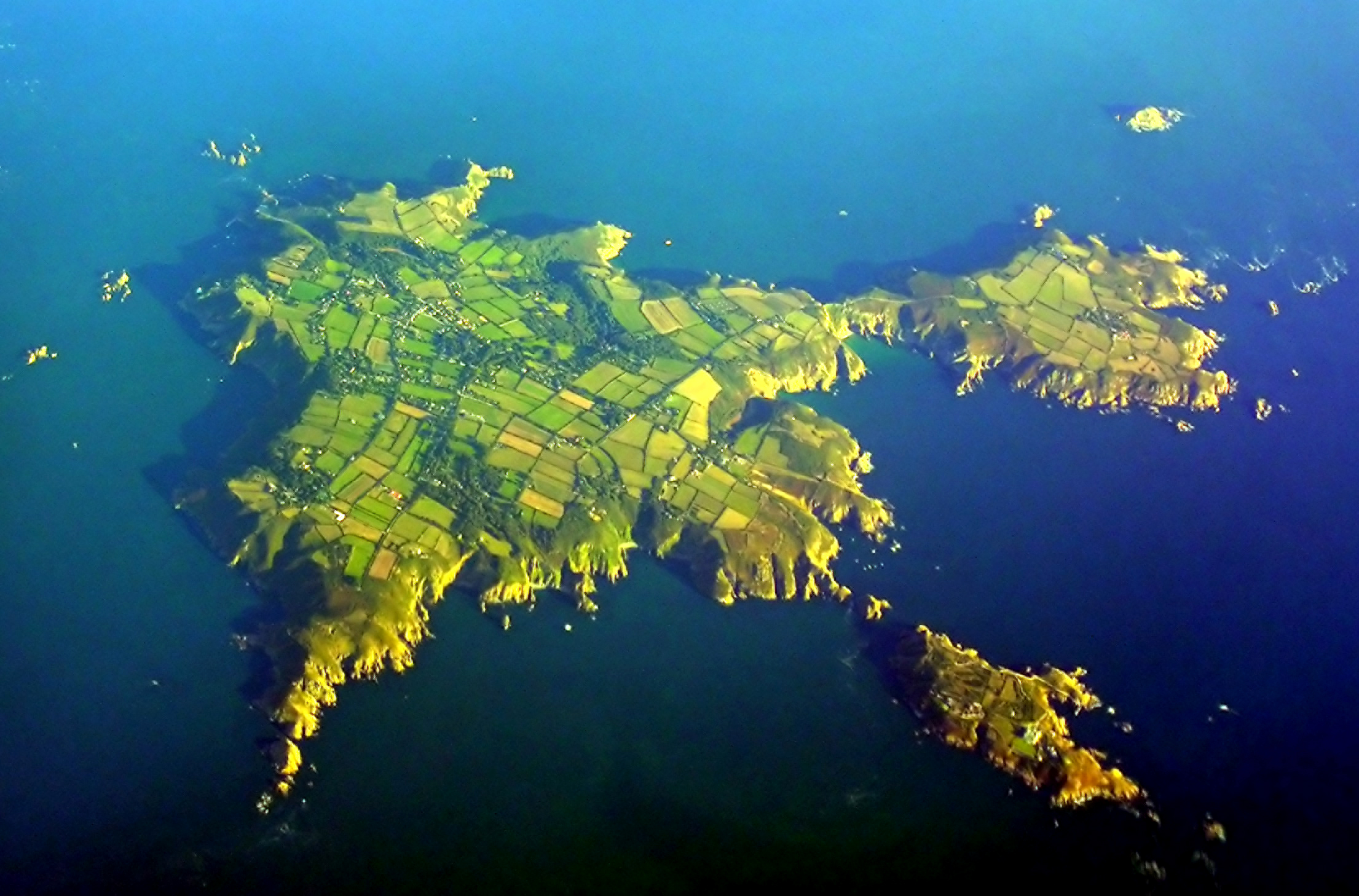
Sark-aerial

Piracy in the islands mainly died when Sark was colonised by Hellier de Carteret in 1563 and they lost their last refuge. Some pirates still hid out in isolated English and French bays, while others sailed up from the Barbary Coast or even Turkey, ransoming valuable captives or keeping them as slaves. It was replaced by legal piracy in the form of privateering. Ships issued with a letter of marque giving the ship the right to capture ships and goods of a specific enemy and to keep the profits.

During the War of the Three Kingdoms, Jersey became a base for Royalist privateers between 1643 and 1651, most notably George Carteret who in late 1643 became Lieutenant Governor of the island. Jersey privateers sailed as far as the Netherlands in their efforts to disrupt Parliamentary shipping; however much of their activity was focused around the Channel Islands and the defence of Jersey.

The main trade continued cross channel, where the islands were given concessions, France, such as St Malo with 60-100 ships a year in the 1680s, expanding to Spain and Ireland, with agents being appointed to source local goods for export and to find buyers for imported goods. These included dried cod from Newfoundland, cloth, wine, wool, leather and household goods.

The ships provided an opportunity for emigration: a number of families moved to America; a number from Jersey settled in Salem, Massachusetts and were among the accused in the 1693 Salem witch trials. A number of emigrants founded what became prosperous and leading families in America. It was not unknown at this time for poor island families to hand over their seven-year-old children to be shipped overseas to America to be sold or hired out, or to work as indentured apprentices, on the promise that they would be fed and clothed.

Jean Martell from Jersey established in 1715 the Cognac manufacturer Martell and established trading links with Guernsey.

The islands were involved in the slave trade. Guernsey has identified 11 sailings, mainly from the Gambia, between 1741 and 1761, with 2,118 slaves taken and 1,800 delivered.

The wine trade was very important: in 1771 Guernsey merchant Le Marchant recorded 8,000 tons of claret shipped from Bordeaux to Ireland, noting it was usual to mix with one-quarter of Spanish wines to make it suitable for the Irish market. By controlling the brandy trade from 1790, Guernsey merchants shipped low quality brandy to Madeira, where it was added to their wine to fortify it. Madeira wine became famous at this time.

Both islands established Chambers of Commerce as the merchant families expanded and grew in wealth. These families included Tupper, Priaulx, Le Marchant and De Jersey from Guernsey and Ste Croix, Robin, Janvrin and Hemery from Jersey, often intermarrying to avoid rivalry. Part ownership of ships show there were 1,238 people were owners of shares in the 19th century, including 280 mariners and 97 in ship related trades, but these also included 55 farmers, 34 widows, 29 "spinsters" and 25 "gentlemen". It was safer to invest in an 1/8th share of each of eight ships than to own one whole ship.

Ship building only became a serious business in the islands in the late 18th century with the requirement to build ships larger than fishing boats. The first lighthouse appeared in 1724 on the Casquets, with ships passing it paying a fee of 1/2d a ton.

Between 1760 and 1815 Great Britain was at war for 36 years, affecting the maritime trade by causing dangers and opening possibilities of profit.

=== Late Modern ===
This period covers the rise of the British Empire into the Victorian era, through the First World War and then the Second World War. This saw the introduction of iron ships, steam, then oil powered ships.

Guernsey merchant William Le Lacheur formed a company in the 1830s and operated ships, and set up a new trade with Costa Rica to bring their coffee to Europe.

Island-built wooden sailing ships were going further, opening up more ports in South America and even going to Hong Kong and Australia. By the 1850s Jersey had 300-400 ships with a tonnage of over 40,000. Guernsey was smaller, with 120 ships of 20,000 tons. Some ships would be away trading for a year or two before returning.

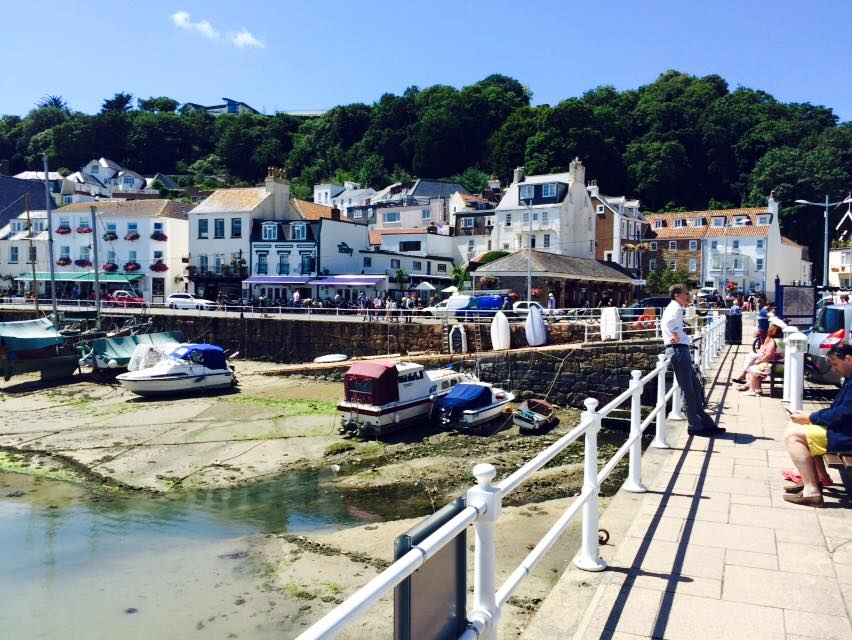
Saint Aubin, Jersey

Both St Peter Port and St Helier harbours were proving too small for the larger ships and increasing tonnages, with both drying out at low tide. Jersey added a few piers to its harbour. St Peter Port was extended by 1864 to allow ships to berth at any state of the tide. Secondary harbours at Saint Sampson, Guernsey and Saint Aubin, Jersey provided limited facilities.

Alderney, which was lacking in harbour facilities, found in the 1840s that it would be given a harbour large enough for the whole of the Royal Navy. It was partly constructed by the 1860s before being abandoned. It was rarely used by commercial ships as it was exposed to wind from the north east.

The change from sail saw a major decline in the maritime activities of the islands: commercial shipbuilding had boomed in the 1850s with 20,000 tons a year before collapsing to 3,000 tons built per year in the 1880s, as iron and steel were not available in the islands. The advantages of trans-shipment of goods through a free port fell away. Freight rates fell, and three Jersey banks had failed by 1886. By the end of the century, island fleets had just 150 ships with a total tonnage of just 11,000.

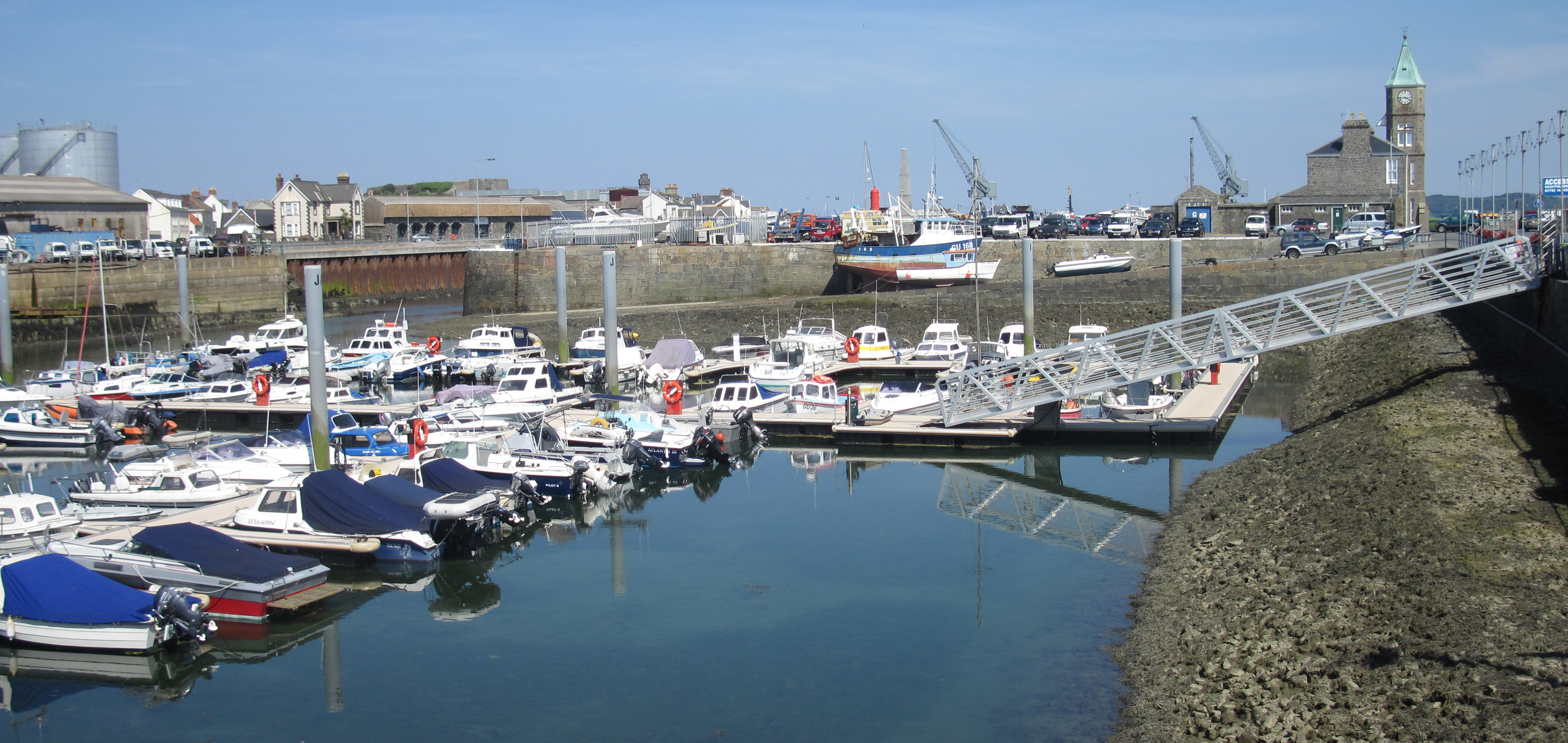
Saint Sampson harbour, Guernsey

The First World War saw island shipping used for the war effort. The peace then saw a demand from visitors for transport, for the first time in competition with aircraft.

The islands were occupied by the Germans during the Second World War, and most island-based ships went to England in June 1940. Initially a number of fishing and private boats, then later smaller craft, made the perilous journey with over 200 escaping islanders. Not all survived: some were captured or shot, others drowned. German shipping, supported by island-based artillery, controlled the seas around the Channel Islands until May 1945.

Since the war, fishing has been reduced, with lobsters and crabs becoming the main catch in the islands with an annual value of around £10m in 1995. Private boating has increased with the construction of marinas. Freighting changing from loose and pallets to containers with Ro-Ro for vehicles. Hydrofoils and then catamarans and wave piercers appeared as fast passenger ships.

== Advantages enjoyed by the islands ==
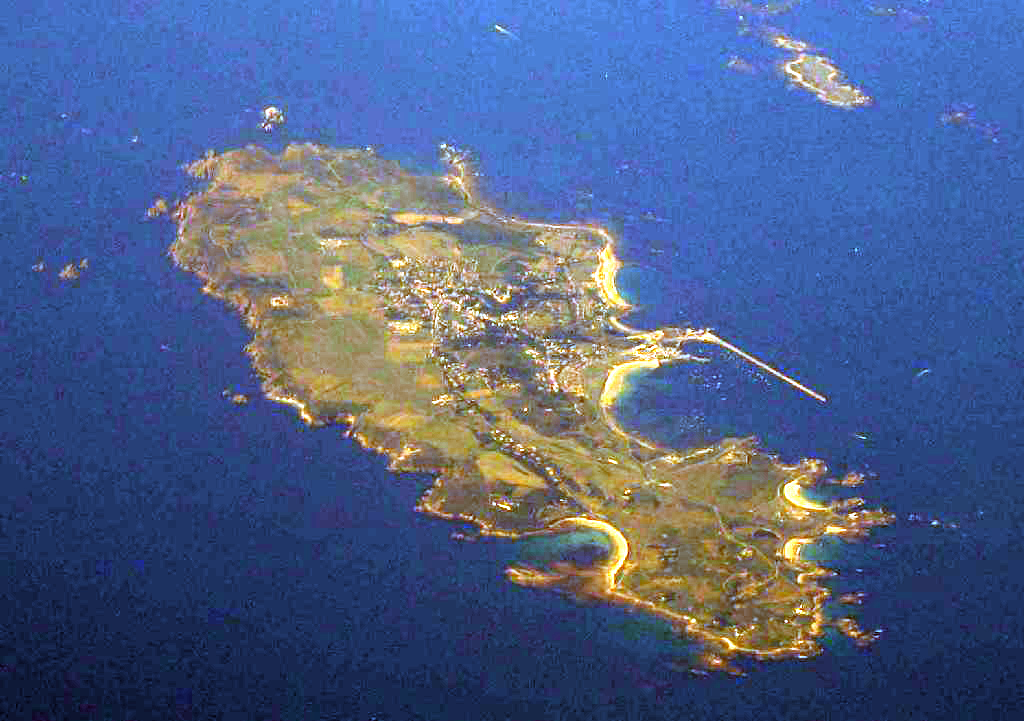
Alderney aerial view

The islands' maritime trade enjoyed a number of advantages:

- The geographical location of the Channel Islands, where trade from the west of Europe and the Americas passed close by.
- The requirement for locals, whose only opportunities were agriculture and maritime related, led to many becoming skilled mariners, firstly as fishermen then as traders.
- Trading concessions with England.
- The two languages, French and English, spoken by the better educated islanders.
- The skills needed to navigate the dangerous local waters kept many foreign sailors from competing.
- The neutrality of the islands from 1480 to 1700 and their free ports.
- The presence of the Royal Navy to protect trade.
- A fierce determination to remain independent from England and to establish and then maintain the right of self-government, leading to the opportunities for entreprise.
- The law, such as, for a period of time, the right not to be impressed into the Royal Navy, if a man served in the local island militias; and as every man had to be in the militia, local sailors might avoid the forced service that afflicted so many English ports.
- St Peter Port harbour, with its outer anchorage, protected from the prevailing Westerlies and the ability to sail north or south attracted most of the trade. St Helier harbour, exposed to the South, could see ships trapped in port.
- Local shipping merchants opened offices in London, along the south coast of England and in overseas countries to boost trade.
- Banking from 1721 and insurance offices were opened in the islands to serve the shipping merchants.

== Types of trade ==
=== Fishing ===
The first mention of fishing in the islands appears in the Norman Exchequer Roll of 1195. The King having the right to require conger to be landed at specific ports and sold to merchants to whom the King had granted a right of pre-emption.

Locally caught fish and shellfish were a mainstay of Island business and exported over the centuries to the best market. Alderney fishermen shipping to Poole being paid 6d for an 11 inches (28 cm) lobster, 3d for smaller ones. In the 1860s 4,000 lobsters were being caught around Guernsey every week.

An unofficial regard for local fishermen everywhere gave them immunity from attack by naval ships and privateers.

Oyster dredging became important and started in 1828 centring around the Chausey oyster beds, where the French also wished to fish. News of these beds brought 300 fishing boats from the south of England, Gorey pier was rebuilt to assist them and after ten years, the beds were shown to be over fished. The Royal Navy and French Navy arrived. At its peak in 1857, 179,690 tubs of oysters were dredged. The capture of a Jersey boat resulted in an invasion of Granville by fishermen who destroyed equipment on the French fishing fleet. To avoid this act of war, the two governments enacted fishing limits. The fishing beds were dying and a ban was introduced. The fishermen ignored the ban resulting in the Jersey Militia firing cannonballs at the fishing boats before arresting 100 men who were fined in court. So ended the “oyster riot”, the English fishermen sailing back to England in 1861. This dramatic event would be followed by many future disputes over fishing rights especially around Minquiers which took until 1953 before the International Court of Justice confirmed that Jersey owned them.

In 1883 1,600 men and boys were engaged in fishing in the Channel Islands from around 800 boats. The numbers would decline with 500 men by 1913. The EU fishing quotas do not automatically apply to island waters. Guernsey fishing boats were banned from EU waters in 2015 to try to get Guernsey to accept the EU quota system.

=== Manufactured goods ===
Knitting in the Islands as a trade had early origins, the quality was so good that Queen Elizabeth I wore Guernsey stockings. Large quantities of wool being imported to the Islands from Southampton by special licence, where a major cottage industry turned the product into desirable high value goods. Stocking were in high demand in France, 240,000 pairs a year being exported there in the 1660s.

The name “Guernsey” as a knitted jumper, used by the RNLI, the Royal Navy and the British Army and “Jersey” as an alternative name for a jumper demonstrating the influence the Islands have had in the knitting industry.

The low tax on sugar compared to Britain saw James Keiller create a marmalade factory in Guernsey in the 1860s. Tobacco processing has been an industry in both Guernsey and Jersey. Exporting its produce all over the world.

=== Entrepôt ===
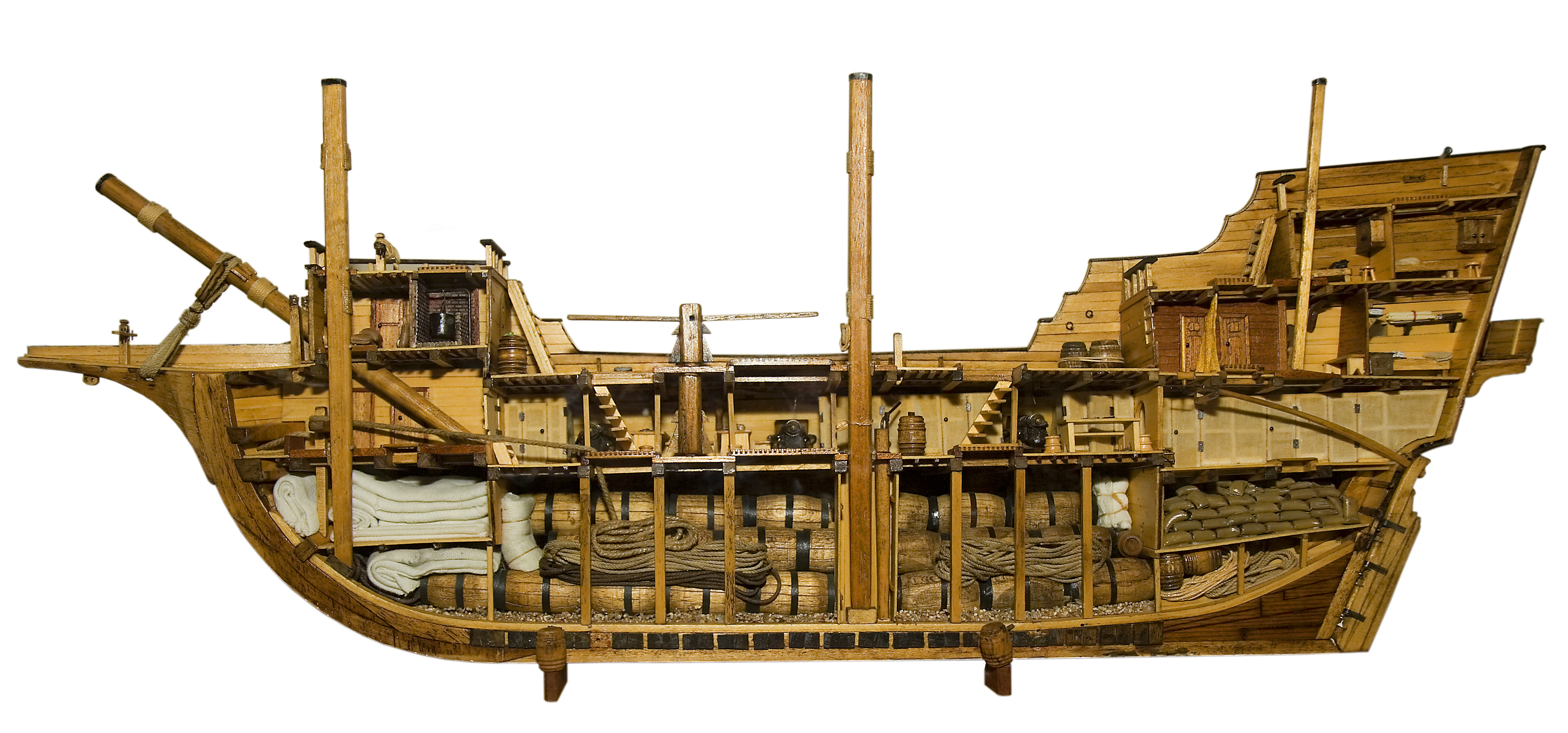
17th-century-merchantman

Being free ports, as the British Parliament had no right to levy taxes in the Islands and the Islands themselves not wishing to levy taxes on goods brought to and then exported again from the Islands, The Channel Islands could import goods from anyone who was not an enemy of Britain, free of British taxes. The local merchants would buy up and supply goods at favourable prices, especially goods taken by privateers. There were no restrictions on whom the goods were sold to, and no liability on the Islanders if the ship subsequently landed those goods without declaring them and paying taxes at their destination.

There were no bonded warehouses in England in the 18th century, so warehouses were built in Guernsey to store and mature wine and spirits until they were needed in England.

=== Cod and North America ===
The Channel Island fishing industry took to the opportunities offered with the opening up of the Grand Banks fisheries. Cod was valuable and from 1763 when Quebec was ceded to the British, colonies were founded by both Jersey and Guernsey in Newfoundland. The people in each colony undertook the fishing and drying, waiting for the company ship to arrive with trade goods they could exchange for the fish. Barrels of dried cod, 1,000-2,000 quintals a year, each weighing roughly 50 kg, being exported by ship to the Caribbean or western Europe. Sometimes there was a three-way trade with ships returning to the Channel Islands where the ship chandlers and merchants benefited.

The American war of independence saw the Guernsey fishing colony fade away as more profitable opportunities opened up, privateering. Jersey continued with the cod trade, in 1840 the Chamber of Commerce estimated the Island had 4,000 people and 8,000 tons of shipping employed in the industry.

The industry continued often using a triangle of fish to Spain, goods from Spain to the Islands and more goods to Newfoundland or cod to Brazil, coffee to Amsterdam and goods back to Canada. The cod monopoly ceased and died as a trade by 1886.

=== Horticulture and agriculture ===
In Guernsey the introduction of glasshouses resulted in a growth on eating grapes and then tomato production from Victorian days, when in the 1880s 10,000 tons were exported annually until the 1970s, with 60 million tomatoes exported each year in the 1960s to England.

Jersey, where the island slopes southwards, has concentrated on growing potatoes for centuries, Jersey Royals proving a great success since the 1880s with 70,000 tons exported in 1891 to England.

The local breeds of Guernsey and Jersey cattle were in demand all over the world and were exported as far as the Americas and the Antipodes.

=== Quarrying ===
During the 19th century quarrying of granite for use in England became a valuable trade good from Guernsey, adding value by creating cobblestones for London streets, although after 1847 gravel was exported for macadamizing roads. In 1861 St Sampson's harbour saw 142,866 tons of stone loaded in 737 ships, it became very crowded and required piers to be rebuilt and repaired, by 1913, annual tonnage had risen to 453,947.

== Other activities ==
=== Privateering ===
Privateering was a continuation of a very old trade. During the English Civil War 1642-1651 Jersey sided with the Royalists, the Lieutenant Governor, George Carteret authorised, in the name of the King, privateering to fund the cost of guarding the Island. Ships captains having to provide a large bond which was forfeit if the ship operated outside its terms of licence. His entrepreneurial views in capturing about 120 prizes for the loss of 12 privateers were rewarded when Charles II granted him land in the Americas, part of which he renamed New Jersey.

In 1689 privateering against French shipping was authorised however only 55 licences were issued by 1697. In the late 1690s privateering annoyed the Dutch who complained to William III, who was also Prince of Orange, and he suspended some of the Islanders rights, however in 1702, the monarch died and business resumed. 759 ships were captured and then ransomed by Guernsey and Jersey privateers by 1711 during the War of the Spanish Succession.

The 32 years of wars with France, during the War of the Austrian Succession, Seven Years' War, American Revolutionary War, French Revolutionary Wars and the Napoleonic Wars saw the resurgence of Privateers being licensed with a Letter of marque to capture enemy shipping and to confiscate cargoes going to enemies of the Crown. Between 1793 and 1801, the Admiralty issued 454 letters of Marque to Channel Island ships, during which time ships and cargoes worth an estimated £900,000 were taken.

Investors, mainly from the Islands and the South West of England, would form a syndicate and put money up to buy a ship, equip it and run it, in exchange for a proportion of the proceeds the privateer acquired. The captain and crew also receiving pay based on performance. It was a risky business, but by spreading the risk many investors made good profits.

Blue water privateering where the ship would “hunt” the open seas, such as off the Azores, or even be sent to Manila occurred. privateers needed large crews to fight and then provide prize crews. The number of skilled men in the Islands enabled the high number of privateers, but there was a limit. In 1798 Guernsey needed 884 men for 78 vessels, Jersey 649 for 59.

=== Smuggling ===
The late 17th century saw smuggling take place on a large scale after the Privilege of Neutrality the islands had enjoyed for over 200 years was abolished by the British government who in August 1689 prohibited the importation of any goods from France. Sometimes with goods transhipped through small and secluded islets such as the Chausey Islands where a French and Jersey boat could meet to exchange goods that each had, with those they wanted. It was recorded that the main smuggled goods in the 1690s through the Écréhous was lead and gunpowder destined for Saint-Malo.

Smuggling tobacco to France was very profitable, £1m of tobacco was imported to Guernsey each year in the 1750s from England, somewhat more than the Islanders needed. In 1802 it was estimated at 5,000 hogsheads, each barrel weighing 1,200 lbs. It was not the only goods bought from England for “resale”, possibly smuggling back into England.

The advantage of the free port was added to with the smuggling of goods, mainly from France during the wars with France, were in high demand in England. Goods such as brandy, perfume, lace and wine. Even goods such as salt were smuggled, as it was impossible to tell the origin of that commodity, landing salt in England and claiming its manufacture in the Islands and tax free as against French salt, which was taxed. France also had a tax until 1790, the gabelle of 140 times the cost of production, so producers wanted to export. In 1795 England arrested 10,000 people for salt smuggling.

Guernsey warehouses were filled with brandy, wine, tea, rum and tobacco, all in high demand and taxed in England, to which fishermen came before returning to a quiet cove in somewhere like Devon or Cornwall to unload, if they could avoid the Revenue Officers. Alderney undertook a speciality of Dutch gin.

Channel Island smuggling boats were not averse to operating between say Ostend and Sussex coasts or even taking goods to Scotland after the Isle of Man was sold to the British Government for £70,000 in 1765, putting an end to their smuggling business.

Anti smuggling laws and more vigilance by the HM Revenue and Customs officers resulted in a higher risk and a fall in business by 1810.

In 1833 Guernsey was refused permission to participate in the British Treasury sponsored business of tobacco smuggling into France. Smuggling still continued, in April 1869 200 lbs of tobacco were discovered secreted on Jethou by Customs officers.

=== Royal Navy ===
There was never a base for the Royal Navy in the Islands although they deployed ships into the area in times of war to defend the Islands, normally based in the anchorage off Guernsey. In the 1840s a decision was made to build two very large harbours, one in Alderney and one at St Catherines in Jersey, both were abandoned, partly constructed.

The Islands have provided a number of volunteer officers and men, a number of whom have risen to high levels within the Royal Navy. Among the more famous are George Carteret (d1680), Thomas Le Hardy (d1732), Charles Hardy (d1744), Philip Durell (d1766), Philip de Sausmarez (d1747) and James Saumarez (d1836). Charles Bertram (d1854) who rose from able seaman to Vice-Admiral. Cecil Burney (d1929). George Ingouville Captain of the Mast was awarded a Victoria Cross during the Crimean War.

=== Passenger transport ===
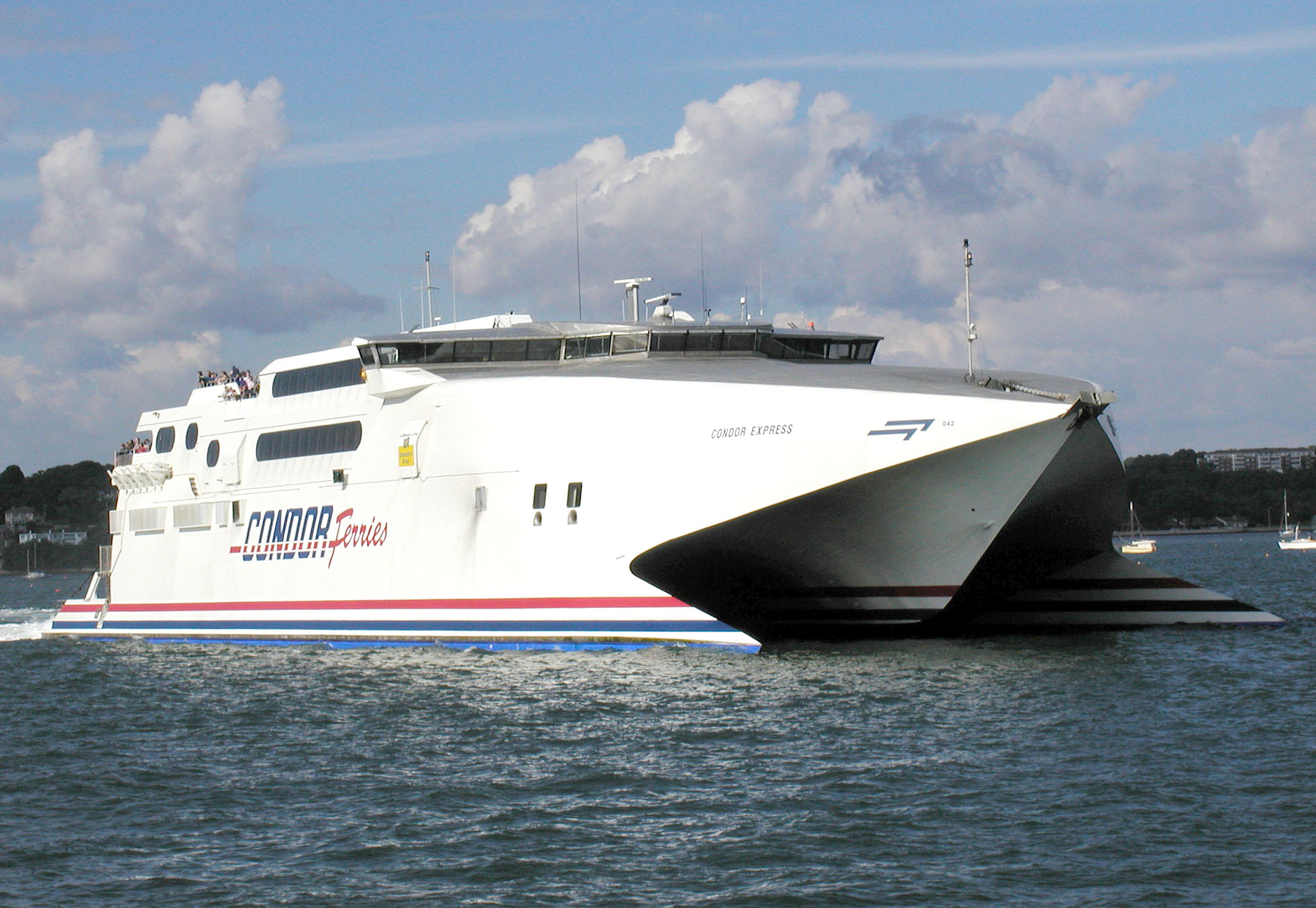
Condor Express passing through Poole Harbour in 2002

Anyone travelling to or from the Islands would originally have travelled on a trading vessel, faster sailing ships designed to carry the post and passengers were introduced before paddle steamers began to arrive in the 1820s, forcing the post to change to paddle steamer, even so it went bankrupt in 1836 This was followed in 1850 with iron screw steamers, with the first SS Sarnia and SS Caesarea operating, but only for a few months.

Railway companies in England, the London and South Western operating from 1843 from Southampton, then the Great Western in 1889 introduced ships from Weymouth to transport their passengers and freight from their trains to the Islands. The competition was high and was a contributing factor in the Stella (LSWR) going too fast in fog and hitting the Casquets, with the Ibex (GWR) hitting Corbiere. Rivalry stopped as customers wanted safety over excessive speed.

Historically, both Guernsey and Jersey have been connected by at least one shipping company. Both islands have also commonly shared services with each other to the United Kingdom and France. Operations were run under British Railways and later as Sealink following a rebrand in 1970.

In 1984, British Channel Island Ferries (BCIF) was founded to compete with Sealink British Ferries, which itself was formed after the UK Government sold Sealink to Sea Containers for £66m.

One of the most prominent players in the market was Condor Ferries. Founded in 1964, the company has evolved from using a mix of hydrofoil ferries to high-speed vehicle ferries and ro-ro vessels. Over the years, the company became the primary operator in Guernsey and Jersey, influenced by the closure of both BCIF in 1994 and Emeraude Ferries in 2006.

In its final years, the company was plagued by financial issues. From May 2024, a ferry tender process was run between Guernsey and Jersey whilst the company was acquired by Brittany Ferries in August 2024. Both islands did not end up choosing the same operator. On 30 October 2024, Guernsey chose to appoint Brittany Ferries as its preferred company to operate a 15-year service contract. Jersey announced on 3 December 2024 that it had selected DFDS Seaways as its preferred operator for the next 15 years from spring 2025, ending Condor's 60 years of lifeline operations in Jersey.

== Shipwrecks ==
The waters around the Channel Islands are very dangerous. Tidal movements of up to twelve knots during equinoctial tides with a rise/fall of 12 metres, a multitude of rocks and reefs have resulted in over 1,000 shipwrecks over the centuries.

Revenues from the Receiver of Wrecks used to go to the Crown, but now rest with the governments of Guernsey and Jersey.

Lighthouses were built on Les Casquets 1724, Les Hanois, 1862, La Corbière 1874, leading lights and other lighthouses were then built where necessary. Cartography was undertaken by French Navy, the British Admiralty and Channel Island merchants.

Guernsey first had a lifeboat in 1803, Jersey in 1830 and Alderney in 1869. Over the years a number of RNLI medals for bravery have been won by lifeboat crews, the first in 1825 to a crew from Jersey.

Rescue services are assisted by Jersey Coastguard, there is the Guernsey Ambulance and Rescue Service with their Flying Christine III, a Channel Islands Air Search plane and the use of a private helicopter. French and British military and rescue services work together with Island-based facilities in saving lives at sea.

== Famous Channel Island mariners ==
- Cecil Burney - Admiral
- George Carteret – Lord of the Admiralty and Jersey Governor
- Philip Durell - Admiral
- George Ingouville VC – Captain of the Mast
- William Le Lacheur – Merchant in coffee
- Peter Perchard – Privateer and Lord Mayor of London
- Charles Robin – Fisheries in Newfoundland
- James Saumarez, 1st Baron de Saumarez - Admiral

== See also ==
- History of Guernsey
- History of Jersey
