= Saint Peter Port Harbour =

Port Harbour located in Guernsey

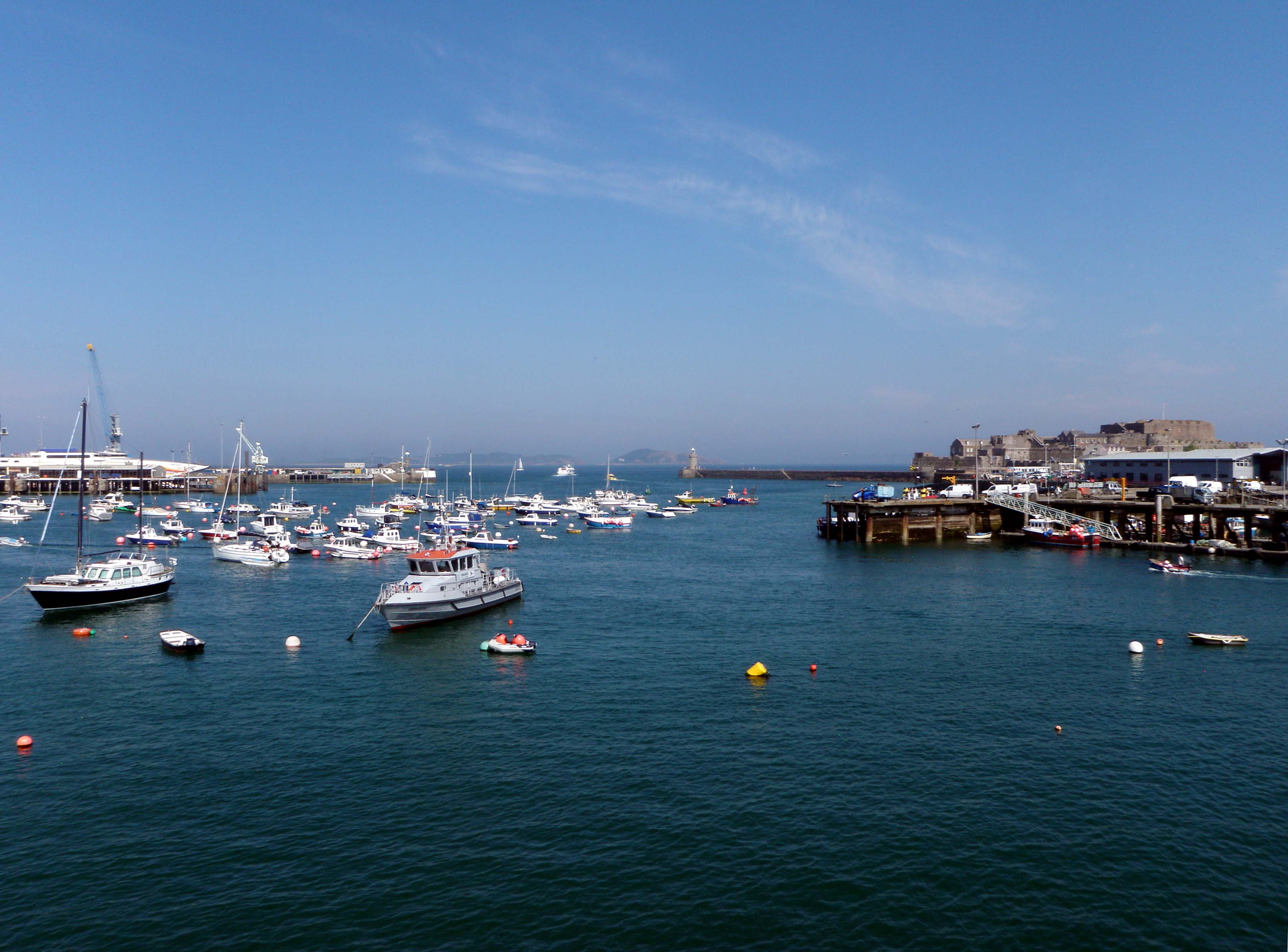
- View of the harbour from the shore, with New Jetty on the left and Castle Cornet to right
- Interactive map of Saint Peter Port Harbour
- Location in Europe

Location
- Country: Guernsey
- Location: Channel Islands
- Coordinates: 49°27′20″N 2°31′52″W
- UN/LOCODE: GBPPO; GGSPT

Details
- No. of berths: 12
- Draft depth: 5.3 metres (17 ft)

Statistics
- Website; Official website

Saint Peter Port Harbour is located in Saint Peter Port, Guernsey. It was a natural anchorage used by the Romans which has been changed into an artificial harbour that is now the island's main port for passengers. Loose cargo, liquids and gas are shipped to and from St Sampson's harbour.

Castle Cornet has formed the harbour main defence for centuries. The castle was formerly a tidal island, but since 1859 a breakwater has connected it to the enlarged harbour.

== History ==
The earliest evidence of shipping was the discover of a wreck in 1982 in the entrance of the harbour, which has been named "Asterix". It is thought to be a 3rd-century Roman cargo vessel and was probably at anchor or grounded when the fire broke out.

The first breakwater, from before the 13th century was a mole, made of loose stones, where the Albert Pier now stands. In 1605, a Royal Charter authorised a pettie Custume tax on imports to Guernsey to pay for harbour development.

The English Civil War saw the harbour in the firing line in 1643 between the Royalist held Castle Cornet and the Parliamentarian held town. Cannonballs fired from the castle caused some damage to the town.

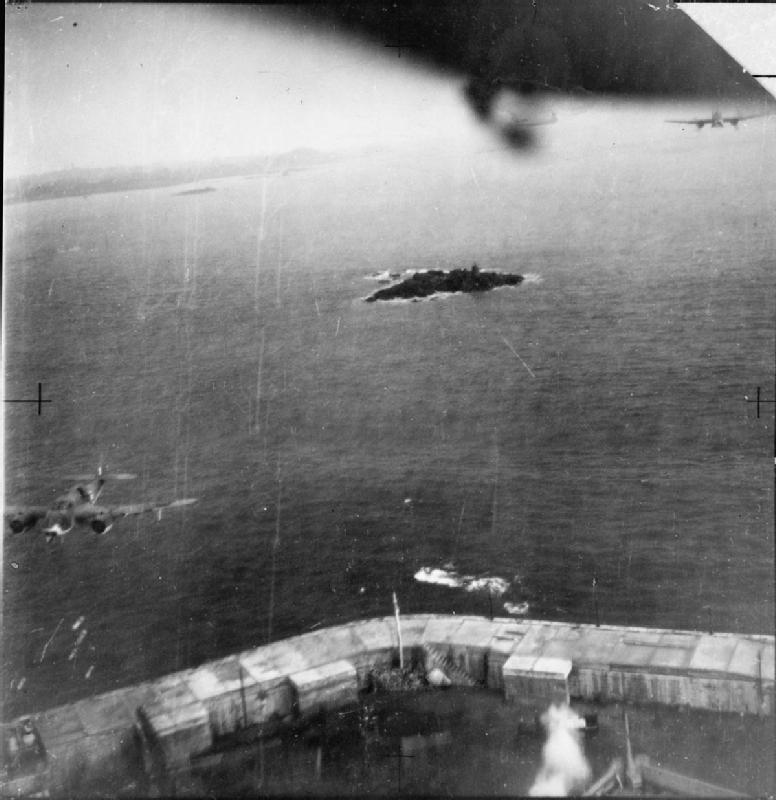
A low-level oblique photograph taken from one of 3 Bristol Beauforts of No. 86 Squadron RAF, attacking shipping in St Peter Port, Guernsey. The aircraft are passing over St Julian's Pier at its junction with White Rock Pier: bombs can be seen falling from the aircraft in the left-hand corner, which was itself nearly hit by bombs dropped from the photographing aircraft (seen exploding at the bottom).

In 1831 gas lamps replaced oil lamps on quays, in 1857 electric lights were demonstrated. The harbour piers were extended by 1864 to allow ships to berth at any state of the tide. Problems were experienced with many piers, quicksand, subsidence and bulges were often solved with piles and by reducing the weight through making problem piers hollow. Dredging in 1899 and removal of some rock from the harbour bed, improved services.

Since 1881 the harbour has housed the Saint Peter Port Lifeboat Station, originally in a building on the Castle Pier.

The First World War saw the establishment of a French seaplane base, on the pier close to Castle Cornet. The pilots flew on constant watch for German submarines.

On 28 June 1940, German commanders sent a squadron of bombers over the islands and bombed the harbours of Guernsey and Jersey. In St Peter Port some lorries lined up to unload tomatoes for export to England were mistaken by the reconnaissance for troop carriers. Forty-four islanders were killed in the raids. The BBC then broadcast the message that the islands had been declared "open towns", after Prime Minister Winston Churchill refused to announce the demilitarisation through diplomatic channels, and later in the day reported the German bombing of the island.

The Second World War saw the town also bombed by Allied bombers which killed harbour workers and caused damage to the harbour, such as on 14 June 1944, having been identified by Cryptanalysis of the Enigma intercepts, which was confirmed with a solo photographic reconnaissance Spitfire from No. 541 Squadron RAF, German submarine U-275 was attacked by no less than 8 Hawker Typhoon strike attack aircraft of No. 263 Squadron RAF while tied up in harbour. No damage was caused to the submarine; escorting vessels were not so lucky, where the rockets hit a Dutch coaster M.V. Karel in the harbour. Many windows in town were shattered including most of those in the Town Church.

The Nazi German forces improved the defences of the harbour including building a number of steel and concrete bunkers and casemates, most of which are located on the Castle pier. One bunker was removed from the New Jetty after the war due to fears that weight may collapse the jetty. Considerable work has recently been undertaken strengthening the New Jetty. A workshop erected by the Germans on the Albert Pier was demolished in the 1970s.

During the mid 1980s the harbour was dredged to provide easier access for shipping, with the excavated aggregate pumped through pipes to reclaim the land currently used for the North Beach parking, between the harbour and the Queen Elizabeth II Marina.

== Harbour Facilities ==
=== Freight and Passengers ===
A passenger terminal and customs facilities are located on St Julian's Pier.

Facilities at the harbour include two ro-ro ramps for cars and lorries that travel on car/passenger ferries such as the 97m long catamaran Voyager or freight/car/passenger traditional ferries such as the Islander.

Preceding station	Ferry	Following station
Terminus	Brittany Ferries; High speed Catamaran	Saint Malo
Terminus	Brittany Ferries; High speed Catamaran	Jersey (Limited Service)
Terminus	Brittany Ferries; High speed Catamaran	Poole
Terminus	Brittany Ferries; Ferry	Saint Malo (Limited Service)
Terminus	Brittany Ferries; Ferry	Portsmouth
Terminus	Travel Trident; Herm Ferry	Herm
Terminus	Isle of Sark Shipping; Sark Ferry	Sark
Terminus	Islands Unlimited; High speed passenger Catamaran	Jersey
Terminus	Alderney Ferry Services; High speed passenger Catamaran	Alderney

Two large cranes and a number of smaller ones facilitate the loading/unloading of containers.

=== Piers ===
==== Albert Pier ====
The southern arm of the original harbour going east from near the Town Church was originally a mole, referred to in 1275 by Edward I of England when it was mentioned as needing reconstruction, given permission to raise a local tax to cover the cost, little was done until a dry stone pier, was constructed by 1580. The pier was well built, standing 35 ft high and 360 ft long, paved with a parapet and still being in good condition in 1815. Until 1806 a roundhouse tower at the end of the pier had been used as a holding cell for prisoners who needed to be shipped by sea to Castle Cornet, a lighthouse was built on the remains of the roundhouse in 1831 before being demolished in 1860. Improved in 1861-63 with north return arm now at right angles. It was renamed in honour of Prince Albert who had died in 1861. A statue of Prince Albert, a copy of an original by Joseph Durham, was erected in 1863.

==== North or Crown Pier ====
The northern arm of the original harbour heads east from the Quay, with a retaining pier for the Careening Hard going north. Originally built from 1703 as a breakwater, gradually improved and by 1750 was completed as a dry construction with an arm heading south east.

The harbour quay was completed by the late 1770s, prior to that everything was landed on the beach, cattle still being made to swim ashore.

In 1838 the entrance to the old harbour was widened to make it 40 ft at the top and 68 ft at the bottom. In 1893 the pier was rebuilt to 220 ft length.

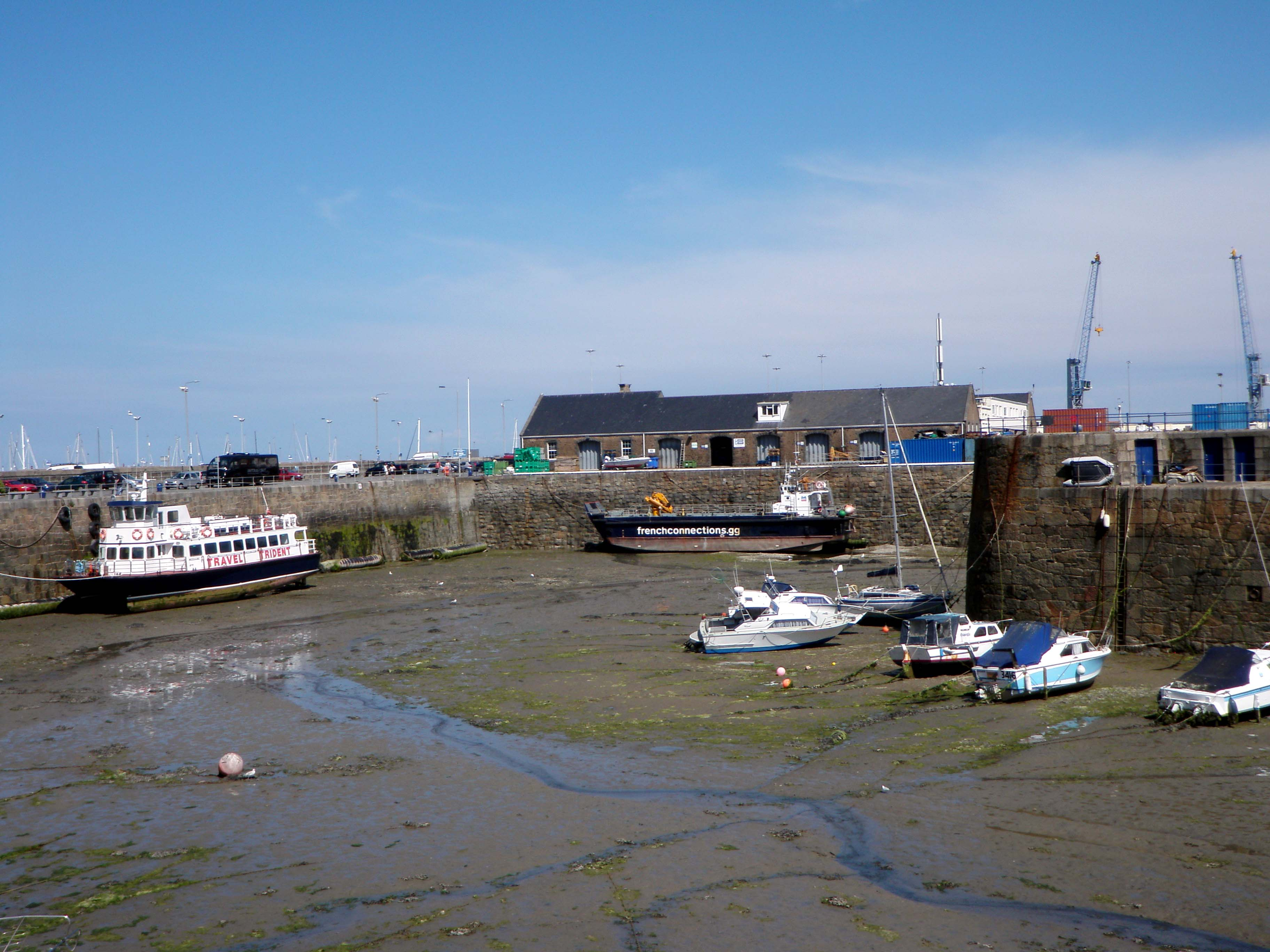
Low tide view of St Julian's Pier and Cambridge Berth

==== St Julians Pier ====
St Julian's Pier is the pier running east from St Julian's Avenue roundabout. The foundation stone for the pier being laid in 1853. The first weighbridge was built on the pier in 1861, later rebuilt in stone in 1892 and upgraded to 20-ton in 1923. Moving east along the pier you reach the Cambridge Berth (1909), the new Inter-Island Quay, the Ro-Ro ramps (1975), the New Jetty (1927) and finally the White Rock Pier with its Lo-Lo facilities.

The lighthouse at the end of the Castle Breakwater

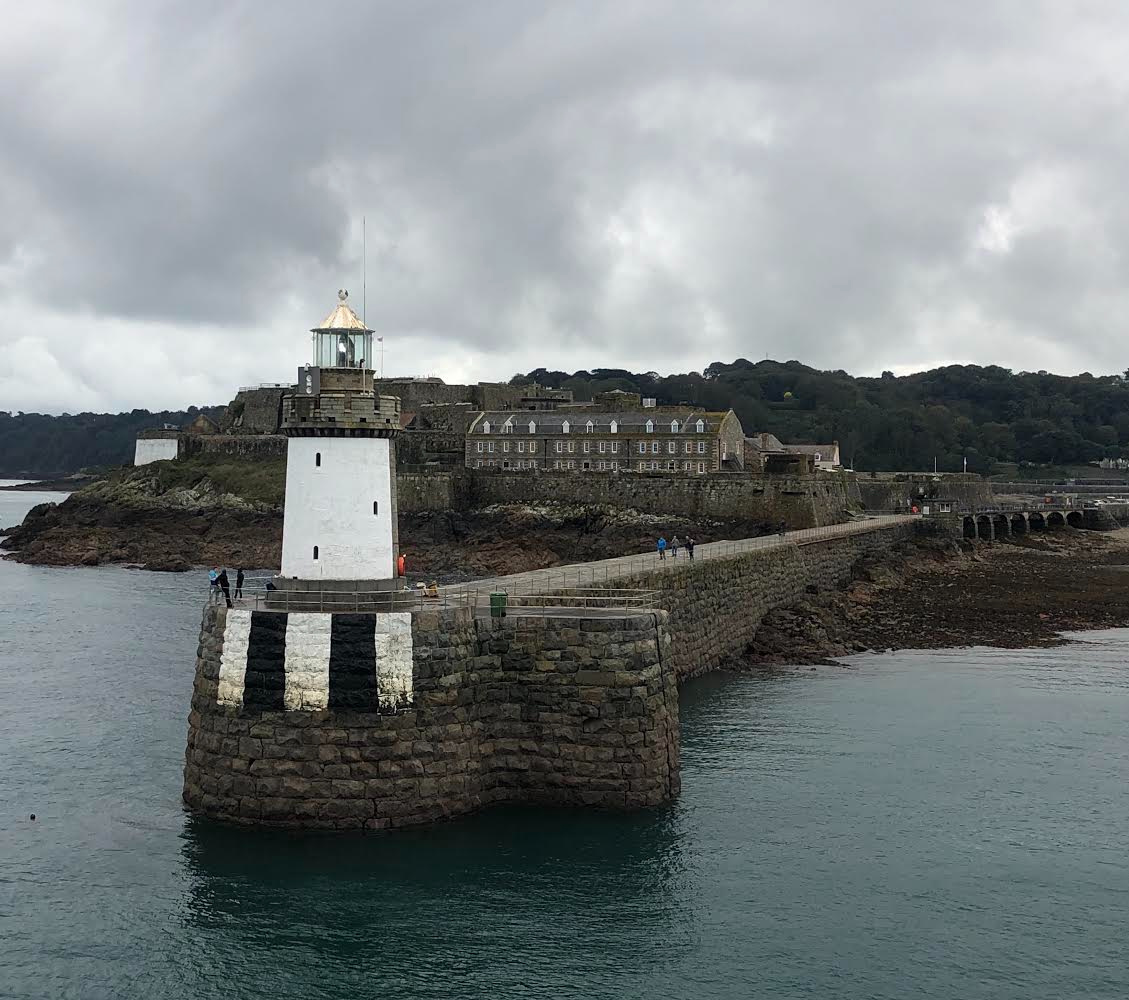
The lighthouse viewed from the ferry

==== Castle Pier ====
The Castle Pier was constructed in the 1850s to protect the southern side of the expanded harbour. Connecting the south esplanade with Castle Cornet to the east. There is a retaining wall for the Albert Marina, the Fish Quay built from the model yacht pond, a connecting bridge to Castle Cornet, and at the end the Castle Breakwater, authorised in 1854, completed in 1861, with its lighthouse completed 1868. The abattoir was completed and the Victoria Boat Pond, later called the Model Yacht Pond, was opened in 1887 for Queen Victoria’s Diamond Jubilee. In the First World War a French seaplane base was established on the pier, next to the pond.

From 1931 to 1951 oil was imported at the Albert dock, the Germans building tunnels in 1942 to house fuel containers at La Vallette, the tunnels now form a museum.

==== Fish Quay ====
A purpose built quay built in 1987 with a reinforced concrete deck supported on piles with pontoons, built out from the Castle Pier to provide facilities for the small number of local fishing boats.

=== Local yachts ===
Two marinas are dedicated to local yachts and motor boats. The smaller original 1975 Albert Marina, located between the Castle and Albert piers and the newer Queen Elizabeth II Marina located north of the St Julian's Pier which was opened by Queen Elizabeth II in 1989. Both marinas have retaining sills.

=== Visiting yachts ===
Visiting tourist yachts and motor vessels can tie up to pontoons inside the inner harbour, which has a fixed barrier to maintain water in the harbour at low tide, or may moor against outer harbour deep water pontoons. St Peter Port marina is the largest marina in the British Isles, it hosts over 10,500 visiting yachts every year.

=== Cruise ships ===
The island has become a regular destination for cruise ships with over 100 ships arriving between April and October and is the largest tender port for cruise liners in Europe.

The restricted size of the harbour will not allow cruise ships to enter resulting in the ships needing to anchor in the roads. The disembarkation of passengers, mainly using their own ships tenders was, until 2014 using a ro-ro ramp on the White Rock pier until an alternative pontoon and ramp were installed attached to the Albert Pier. Initially the ramp caused complaints as it was considered too steep to passengers to climb when tides were very low, in 2015 this was rectified with a longer ramp which reduced the gradient.

Businesses are developing for transporting and entertaining the 100,000+ annual visitors, with some queues being experienced on days when two large ships arrive on the same day.

== Memorials ==
A number of commemoration plaques and memorials are located at the harbour:

At start of St Julians Pier

- Plaque in memory of the local people lost when RMS Titanic sank

On St Julians Pier:

- Plaque to commemorate evacuation of children in 1940
- Plaque in memory of those killed in the harbour bombing in 1940
- Plaque in memory of the holocaust and Jewish residents deported in 1942
- Plaque to commemorate deportation of islanders in 1942-3
- Plaque in memory of foreign workers who died in 1940-5
- Guernsey Resistance plaque
- Liberation monument to commemorate the liberation in 1945 (winner of Civic Trust Award in 1997

At end of St Julians Pier

- Plaque in memory of loss of SS Stella (1890) and sacrifice of Mary Ann Rogers.

On slipway in inner harbour:

- Stone commemorating landing of Queen Victoria and Albert, Prince Consort in August 1846
- Stone commemorating landing of Task Force 135 troops on 9 May 1945

On Albert Pier:

- Statue of Prince Albert

== Gallery ==
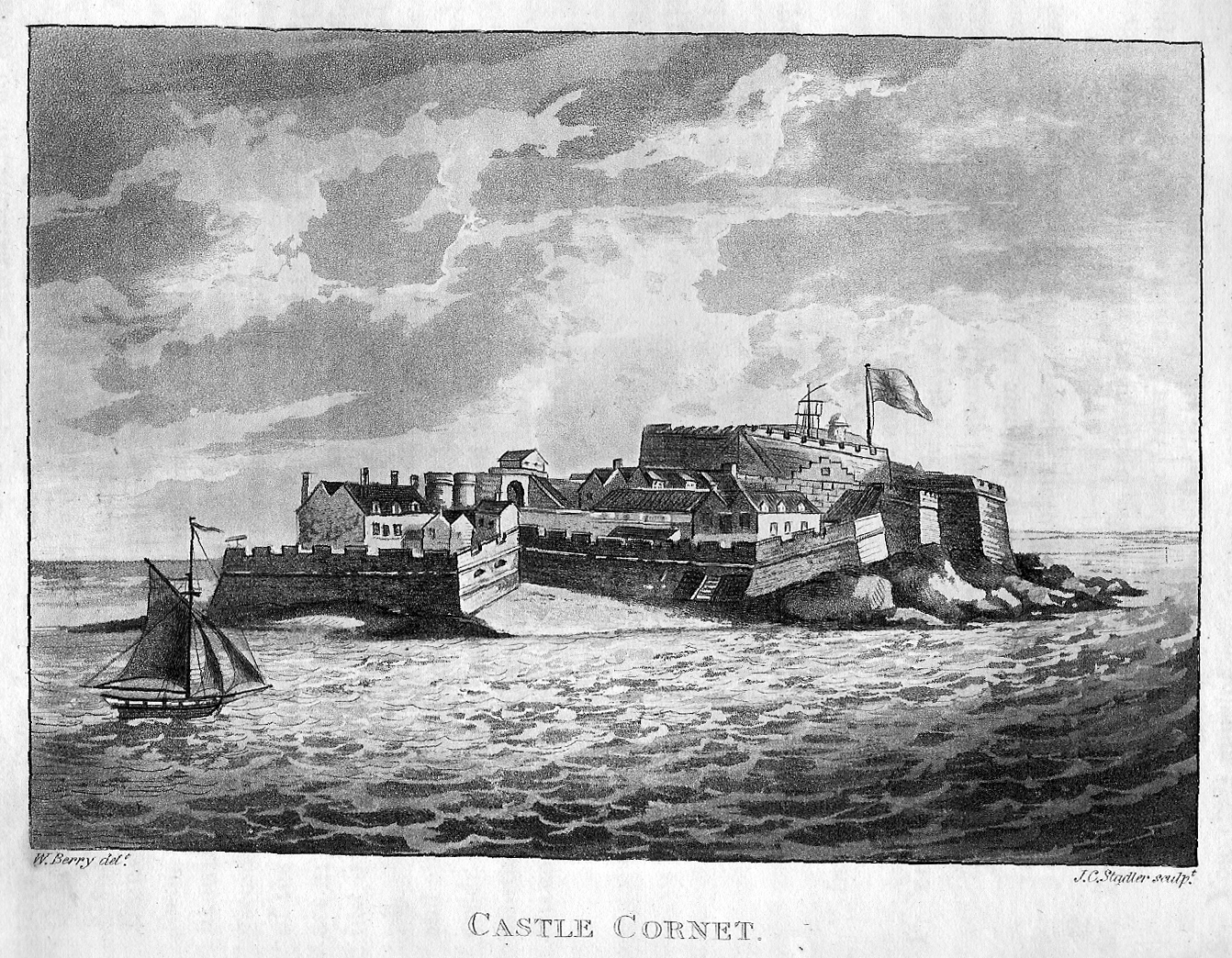
An old print of Castle Cornet c. 1814.

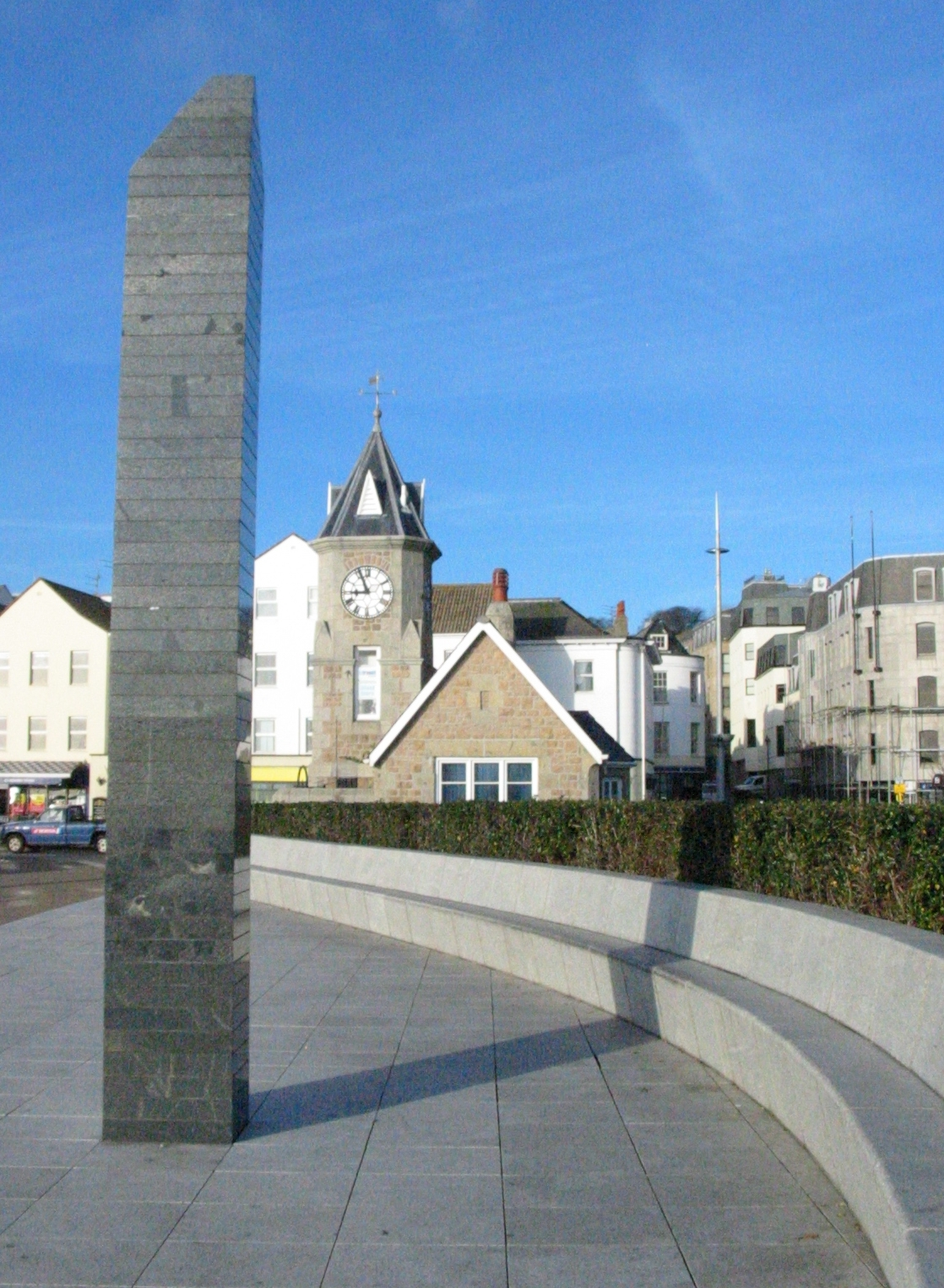
Liberation Monument

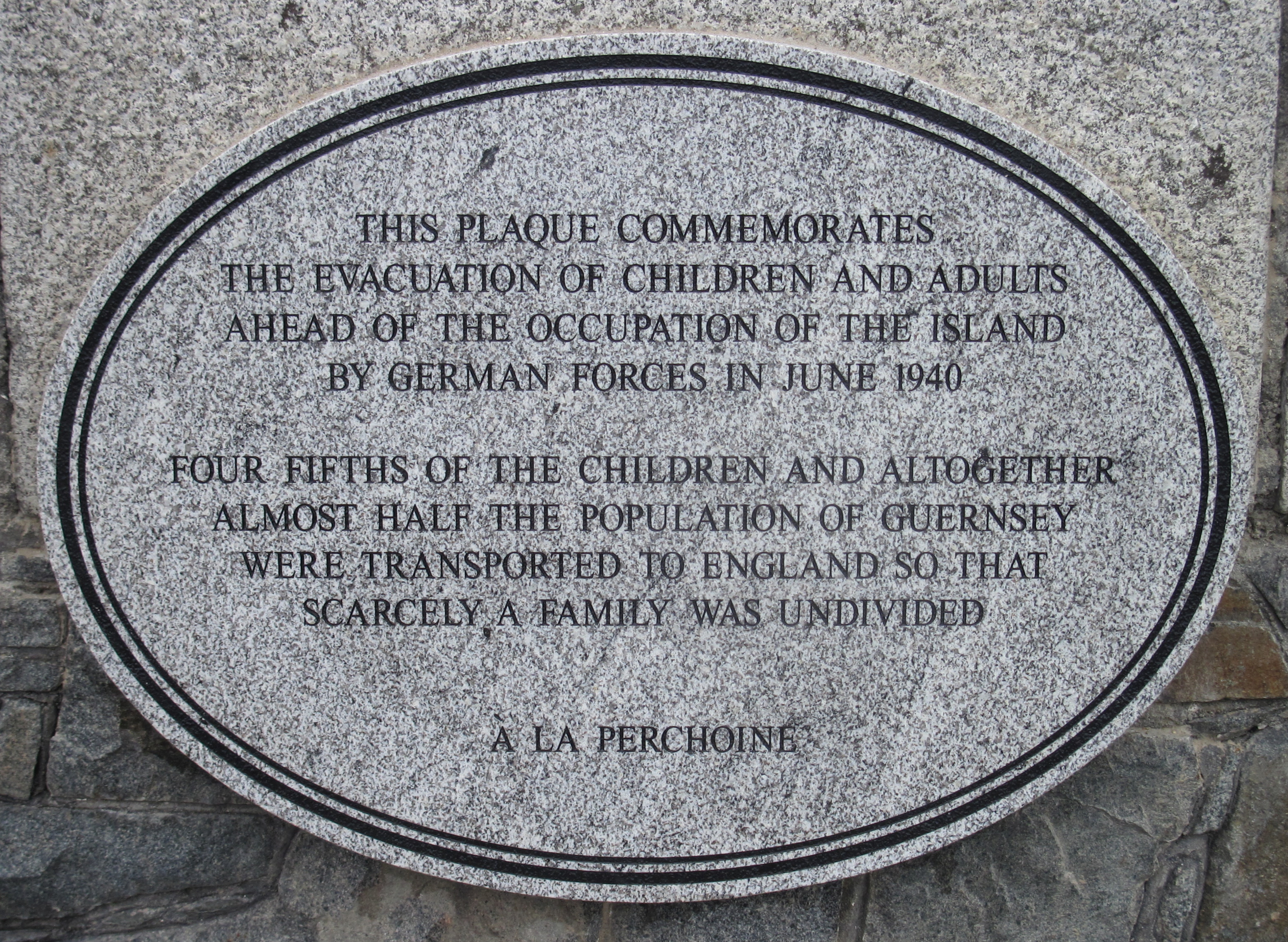
Evacuation of children

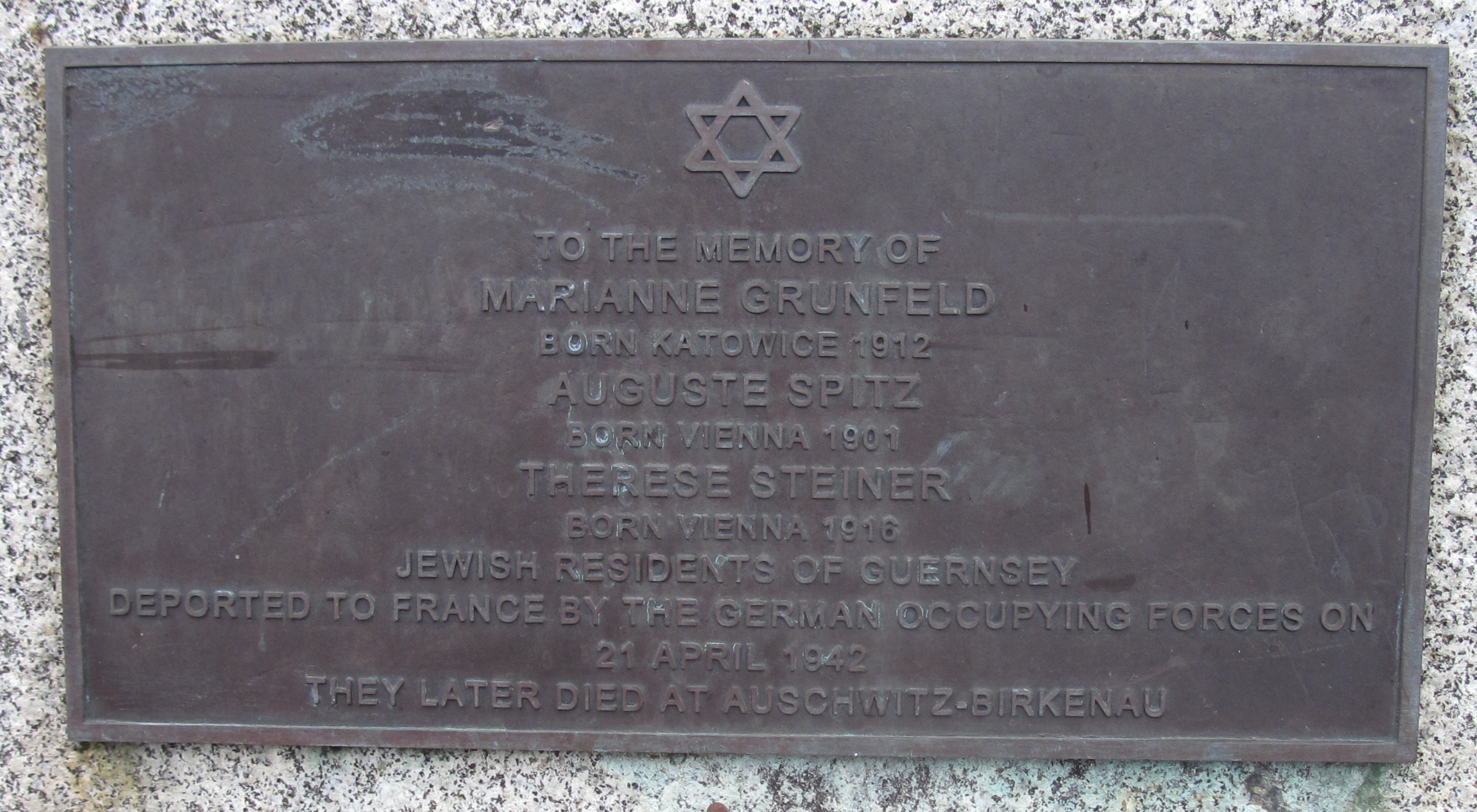
Deportation of three Jews

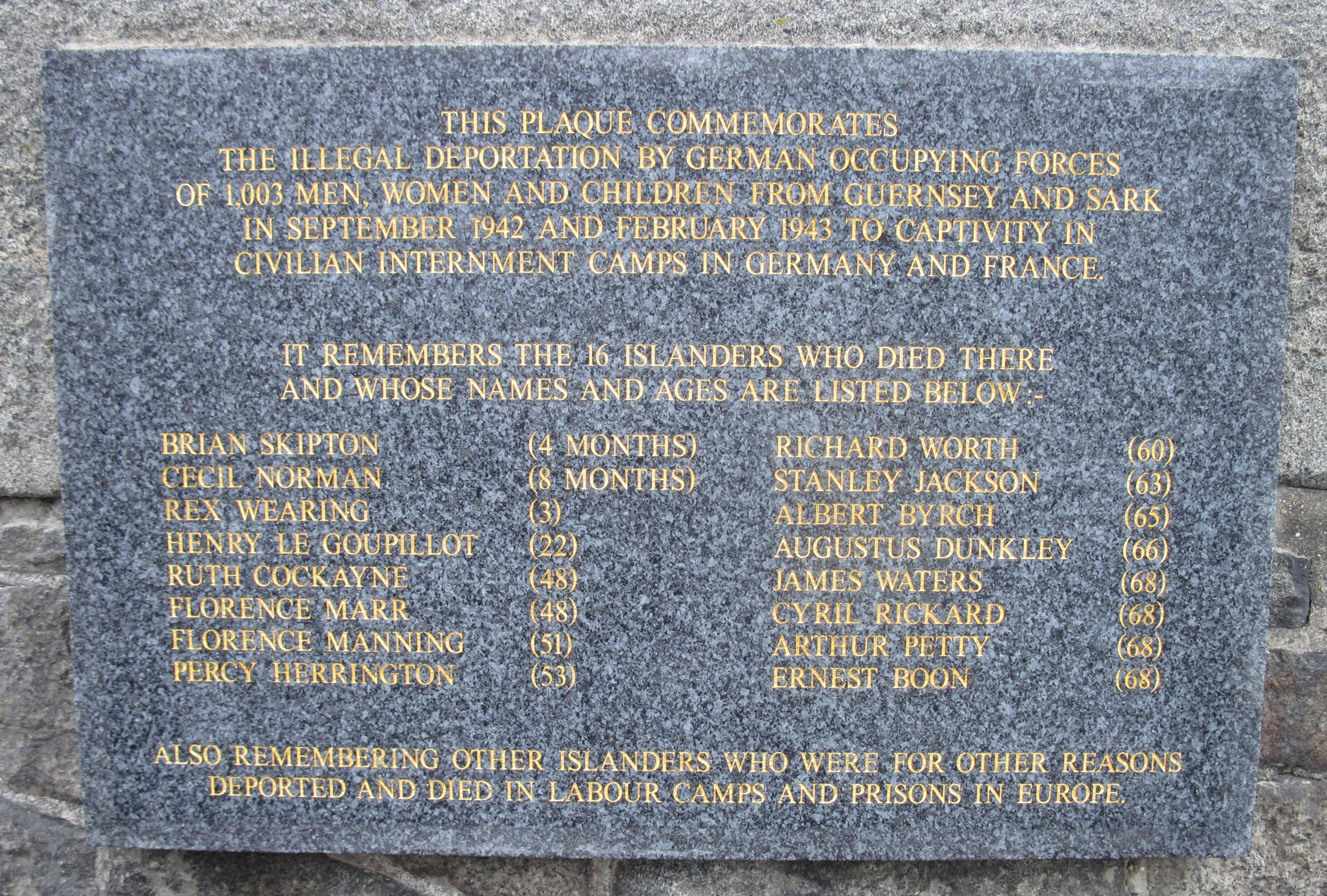
Deportation of islanders

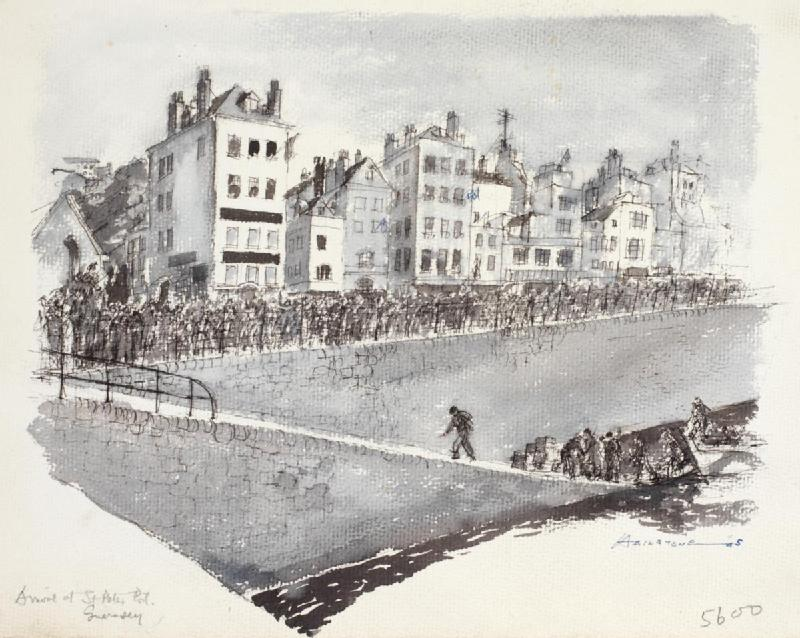
British troops landing during the liberation

== See also ==
- Maritime history of the Channel Islands
- Harbour master plan 2013
- Guernsey harbours web site
