= Channel Islands in the Wars of the Three Kingdoms =

Between 1642 and 1651 the Channel Islands were involved in an eleven-year-long, wide-scale armed conflict known as the English Civil War, between the Parliamentarians (nicknamed pejoratively as the Roundheads) and Royalists (nicknamed the Cavaliers) over, principally, the manner of England's government and the amount of power the monarch should be able to wield.

For the most part, Jersey remained loyal to the Crown (even sheltering the future Charles II of England on two separate occasions in 1646 and 1649), whereas Guernsey, with the exception of Castle Cornet, was under Parliamentarian control. By 1651, Parliament gained control of both the islands and held them during the Interregnum even imprisoning Leveller dissident John Lilburne in Mount Orgueil Castle on 16 March 1654, due to Jersey having no habeas corpus laws. After the restoration of monarchy in 1660, the Parliamentarian general John Lambert was imprisoned on Guernsey.

== History ==
From 1642 to 1651, England was torn apart by a series of internal conflicts known as the English Civil War between Charles I of England (and later Charles II of England) and those who supported Parliament. The nature of the engagement was primarily based on whether the monarchy wielded absolute power over its subjects or was a constitutional monarchy and had to rule alongside a legislative body (e.g. English Parliament). As the war became more protracted, hostilities eventually spread to other parts of the British Isles (notably Scotland and Ireland) yet the Channel Islands were gradually embroiled in the conflict as well. While there was some support for Parliament amongst the island's inhabitants, Jersey under the de Carterets (see Sir George Carteret and Sir Philippe de Carteret II) were able to secure the island for the King throughout much of the civil war period. Guernsey, on the other hand, sided with the Parliamentarian cause, though Castle Cornet was held by Royalist sympathiser, governor Sir Peter Osborne, until 1651.

=== Beginnings of the conflict on Jersey ===
On 26 March 1642 (Note: Dates are O.S. however the start of the year is taken to be 1 January rather than 25 March. Therefore 1 January 1641 becomes 1 January 1642.) a petition was presented to the Long Parliament calling for the arrest of the then Governor and Bailiff Sir Philippe de Carteret on charges of mis-government. The petition's authors were a committee of several jurats, notably Mr De La Hague, Mr Sammares, Mr Maufant, Mr Bisson, and Mr Hérault. They were joined by an unlikely ally, the Dean of Jersey, David Bandinel. The chief charges were those of mis-governance, nepotism, and cronyism displayed by Sir Philippe.

Noticeably absent from the petition was discussion of religious differences that came to dominate similar protests in England. This was due, in part, to Sir Philippe's own faith, which would have been seen as favourable to Parliament in England. However, the Dean had been an enemy of Parliament, having been arrested in 1641 for imposing episcopal governance on the island during the 1620s and then jumping bail to return to Jersey. Another key figure, Pierre d'Assigny, was a Huguenot, given shelter by de Carteret on the island and became minister of the Town Church. This was against the Dean's wishes, as he was opposed to d'Assigny and de Carteret's Calvinist views. In spite of this early friendship, d'Assigny would become an enemy of de Carteret.

Following the petition, Parliament issued an arrest warrant for Sir Philippe as a result of his notoriety and the privateering actions of his nephew, George Carteret:

By Vertue of an Order of the Lords and Commons in Parliament, Wee doe hereby authorise and require Mr La Hague, Mr Sammares, Mr Maphant, Mr Bisson, and Mr Herault, Justices of the Peace of the Isle of Jersey, them and every of them joinctly, and severally, by the Counsell and helpe of those of the said Island, who stand well affected to the King and Parliament; to the maintenance of the Protestant Religion, the lawes and liberties of the Kingdome, and priviledges of Parliament, to apprehend the person of Sir Philip Carteret, Knight, Lieftenant Governor of the Island.

However, he refused to be arrested in the name of Parliament, declaring in March 1643 that "This Island has nothing to doe with Parliament but only to the King in Council". From a constitutional perspective this was correct, but de Carteret had made many enemies and they had been pushed towards Parliament by the king's steadfast support for Sir Philippe. Much of the island rebelled, led by a committee of jurats who had formed a bloc in the States against de Carteret; the Dean of Jersey; and the firebrand Huguenot preacher, Pierre d'Assigny, then Minister of the Town Church. Faced with the militia marching on the town, Sir Phillipe fled to Elizabeth Castle while his wife and a son managed to successfully seize the fortress of Mont Orgueil located at the east of the island.

The Parliamentarian faction began the construction of works with which to bombard Elizabeth Castle, and the yard of the Town Church was converted into an artillery battery. Under the instructions of Pierre d'Assigny (Minister of the Town Church), further batteries were constructed on the Town Hill. However, the population was becoming increasingly reluctant to cooperate with the Parliamentarian leadership. Works were also constructed with which to bombard Mont Orgueil Castle. England provided modern cannons, however these were poorly deployed at the last minute and had little or no effect on breaking the deadlock. The Royalists mounted several skirmishes towards St. Helier and the batteries, most of which were gunnery exchanges at long range with only minimal effect.

=== Recapture of Jersey by the Royalists ===
With the capture of Jersey's only two fortresses, the island fell to the Royalist cause within the year, and following the death of Sir Philippe in 1643, his nephew George Carteret, took over operations for the Royalists. In order to fund the military presence in the island, Carteret took to privateering. Along with his privateering exploits, George Carteret also sought to imprison Parliamentarian supporters and confiscated their property to fund Royalist expenses. However, this alone was not enough, and by 1645 the Royalist cause was in urgent need of revenues—resulting in additional unpopular taxation. A new Court House in the Royal Square was constructed as a symbol of royal power, prominently displaying the arms of both Carteret and the king.

The Prince of Wales, the future Charles II, was given sanctuary on the island of Jersey in 1646 and again in October 1649. Charles II was publicly proclaimed king after his father's death (following the first public proclamation in Edinburgh on 5 February 1649) in the Royal Square in St. Helier on 17 February 1649. Charles' visits also led to unwelcome changes in the nature of the island's religion. After the initial rebellion, the Church had reverted to its Calvinist/Presbyterian state; however, this was reversed when the Royalists regained control. These changes were branded by contemporary critics as "papist", and the Jersey church was brought closer to that of the Caroline—one which "greatly scandalised the people". These changes, along with the presence of many Catholic soldiers on the island, the population was borrowing increasingly disgruntled as Carteret's regime became more autocratic and oppressive. Even Royalists who criticised Carteret's methods were not safe from persecution, as exemplifed by the Reverened le Cloche of St Ouen and his wife, who disagreed with piracy and accused Carteret of being Godless. Similar views were shared by a fellow, if moderate, Royalist, Jean Chevalier in his journal.

=== Fall of Jersey to Parliament ===
With Jersey being the last Royalist stronghold in the British Isles (as well as the effects of George Carteret's raids on shipping), a Parliamentarian force of 84 ships carrying c. 3,000 men including 700-800 cavalry, under Colonel James Heane and naval commander Robert Blake, was commissioned in 1651 to retake the island.

The Parliamentarians landed on 20 October 1651 to the west of the island at St Ouen's Bay and managed to defeat the royalist force assembled to meet them in a short confrontation. The Royalist forces were heavily demoralised, having been forced to march up and down the bay under fire from Parliamentary ships who were sailing around to disguise the point of their landing. Support for Royalism on the island was also far lower than it had been in 1643 when the Parliamentarian faction was ousted from power. Many were unwilling to fight and the majority of the island was apathetic to the Royalist cause. Contemporary chroniclers point to Carteret's dictatorship, changes to the religion and war weariness as a primary cause. Many of the Royalist forces routed before any heavy fighting could take place, the majority of casualties were sustained by the cavalry who stayed longer, though even these were light. The Royalist forces were forced to retreat to their strongholds on the island. Morale amongst the Royalist garrison at Mont Orgueil was low, and they surrendered on amiable terms to Col. Heane, faced with the prospect of modern artillery being deployed on Mont St. Nichols, and with no prospect for relief the Old Castle would not have held for long, and the struggle would have largely been futile.

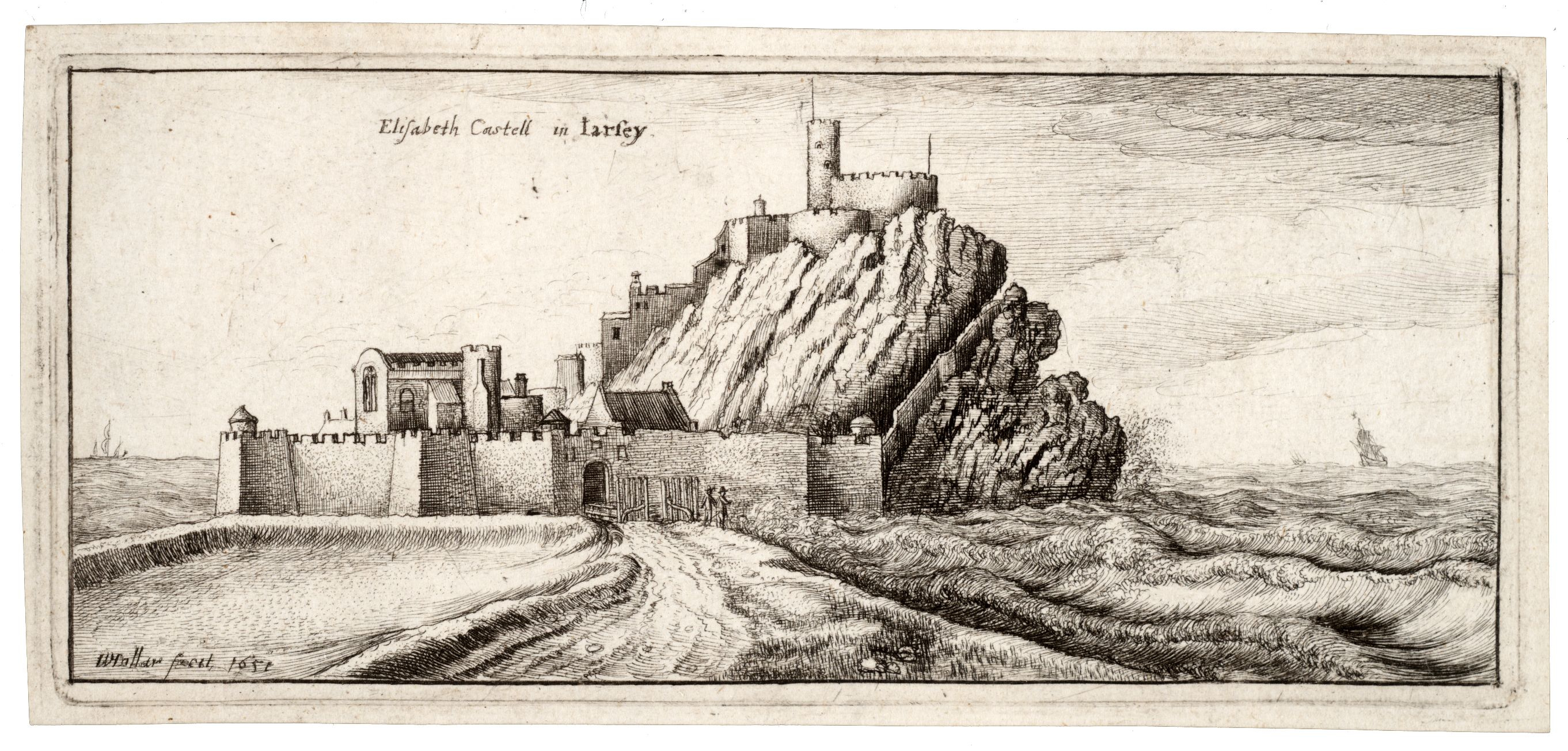
Elizabeth Castle as it appeared during 1651, before the destruction of the Abbey Church

Elizabeth Castle, a modern fortress, surrendered seven weeks later after a protracted siege on 15 December 1651. The Parliamentarian forces were forced to deploy heavy mortars in order to bomb the fortress into submission, several batteries were constructed, the Town Church was converted into a guardhouse. The Parliamentarian bombardment of the castle destroyed the medieval abbey church in the heart of the castle which was being used as a storehouse for ammunition and provisions. Having lost many of his supplies, and powder and with no hope of relief due to Parliamentarian naval presence there was no hope of repelling an enemy attack. Sir George Carteret surrendered to Col. Heane of the Parliamentarian forces on the similar terms to that of Mont Orgueil. He and the other Royalist defenders were granted permission to withdraw to the continent. It is said that Carteret and Heane departed amicably.

In recognition for all the help given to him during his exile, Charles II gave George Carteret, bailiff and governor, a large grant of land in the American colonies, which he promptly named New Jersey, now part of the United States of America. In 1663 The States of Jersey were awarded a gilded Royal Mace in recognition of the island's support during Charles II's time in exile.

=== Guernsey ===
Guernsey sided with the Parliamentarians. Guernsey's decision was mainly related to the higher proportion of Calvinists and other Reformed churches, as well as Charles I's refusal to take up the case of some Guernsey seamen who had been captured by the Barbary corsairs. The allegiance was not unanimous, however; there were a few Royalist uprisings in the south-west of the island and Castle Cornet was held by the royalist governor, Sir Peter Osborne. From Castle Cornet, Osbourne was able to bombard the town of St. Peter Port unopposed, making sections of the town inhabitable. Throughout the period Castle Cornet was kept supplied by George Carteret.

In 1651, Jersey, which had been under royalist control since 1643, was seized by parliamentarian forces under Colonel James Heane. The Parliamentarians then captured the Crown of England that had belonged to Charles I which had been resident in the Court House in Jersey and brought it back to Guernsey, delivering it to the Governor of Castle Cornet as proof of Jersey's surrender.

The castle surrendered on about 9 December 1651, with the garrison permitted to march out bearing arms and to leave the island, effectively ending all royalist resistance to The Protectorate in the British Isles.

After the restoration of monarchy in 1660 the Parliamentary general John Lambert was imprisoned in Guernsey.
