= St Julian's Pier =

Coordinates: 49°27′31″N 2°31′55″W

St Julian's Pier is a pier in Saint Peter Port Harbour, Guernsey.

The pier runs from the base of St Julian's Avenue, where a roundabout is now located, eastwards.

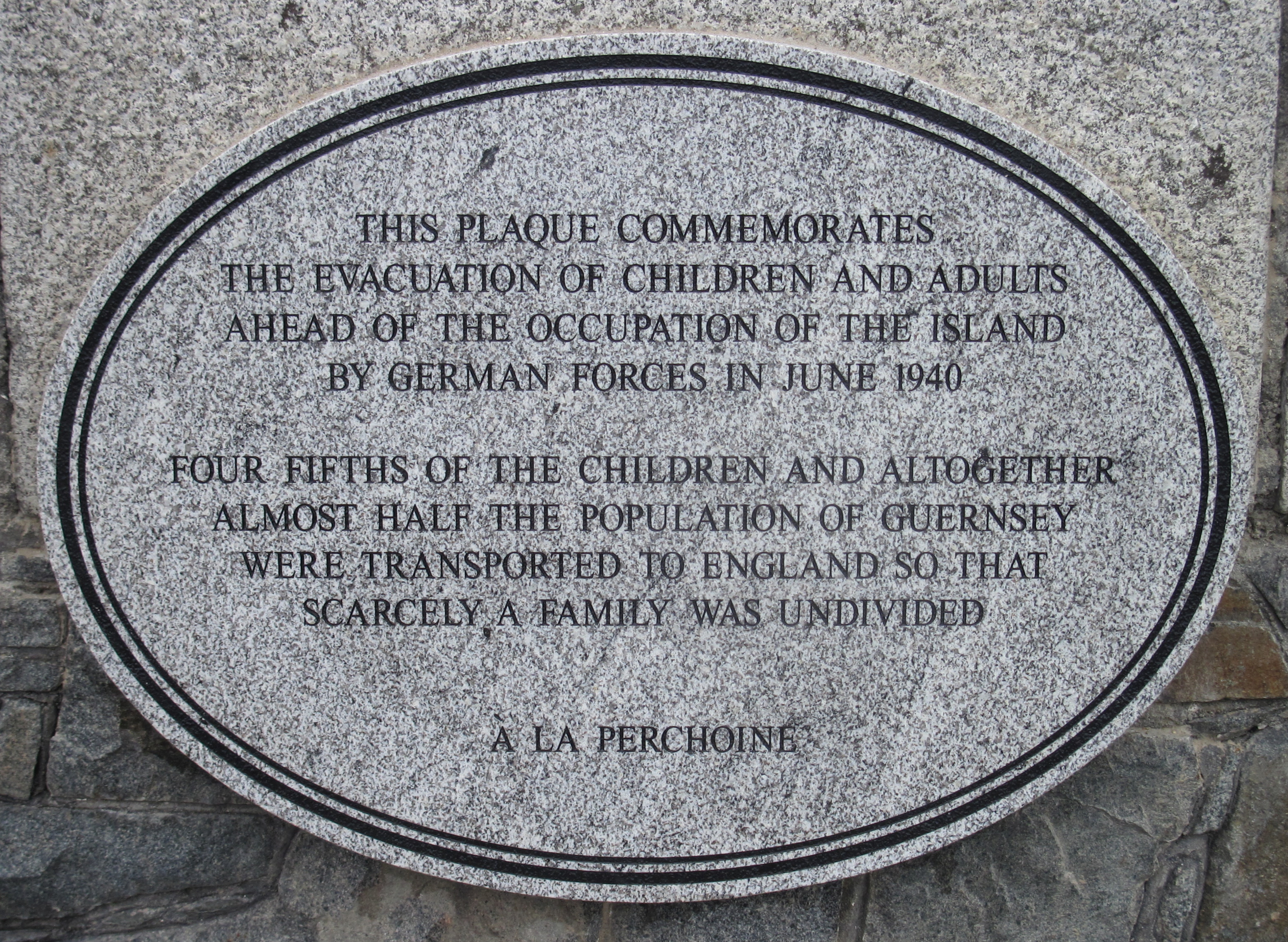
Memorial in Saint Peter Port: "This plaque commemorates the evacuation of children and adults ahead of the Occupation of the Island by German forces in June 1940. Four fifths of the children and altogether almost half the population of Guernsey were transported to England so scarcely a family was undivided. À la perchoine."

The cambridge berth is a later construction built at right angles to the pier, in a southerly direction as is the New Jetty and at the eastern extremity, the White Rock Pier.

To the north of the pier is the Queen Elizabeth II marina.

== Monuments and memorials ==
The pier has a number of monuments and memorials

- 50th Anniversary liberation monument in the form of a large obelisk and sundial.
- Liberation stone
- Plaque commemorating the evacuation of children and adults ahead of the Occupation of the Island by German forces in June 1940
- Plaque to victims of the Holocaust
- Plaque to remember the Deportees
- Harbour bombing memorial
- Plaque to remember the Foreign Workers
- Guernsey Resistance plaque
