= Royal charters applying to the Channel Islands =

This is a list of charters promulgated by monarchs of England that specifically relate to the islands of Jersey, Guernsey, Alderney or Sark which together form the Channel Islands, also known as the Bailiwick of Jersey and the Bailiwick of Guernsey.

Forming part of Brittany and then Normandy in the 10th and 11th centuries, the Duke of Normandy, in 1066, took the Crown of England.

The physical location of the Channel Islands became important when the English monarchs began to lose their French possessions and the islands became the front line in a series of wars with France that lasted for centuries. Loyalty to the English Crown was rewarded.

The charters are given in the form of letters patent being a form of open or public proclamation and generally conclude with: In cujus rei testimonium has literas nostras fieri fecimus patentes. (in witness whereof we have caused these our letters to be made patent.) The charters being confirmed by the Council in Parliament, or by the Parliament of England.

== List ==
The legal materials are as follows:

Year	Monarch	J	G	A	S	Subject	Notes
1279	Edward I	✓	✓	✓	✓	Charter granting Seal to the Bailiff.	
1341	Edward III	✓	✓	✓	✓	For continued faithfulness, grant continuation of privileges, liberties, immunities, exemptions and customs, including heirs and successors. Granted by us and our heirs.	
1378	Richard II	✓	✓	✓	✓	Confirm for continued faithfulness and because of the great dangers and costs, grant continuation of privileges, liberties, immunities, exemptions and customs as regards persons, goods and monies, including heirs and successors. Granted by us and our heirs.	
1394	Richard II	✓	✓	✓	✓	In consideration of good behavior and great loyalty, granted the peoples and communities to be free of all tolls, duties and customs in England, provided the loyalty continues, including heirs and successors. Granted by us and our heirs.	GG
1400	Henry IV	✓	✓	✓	✓	Confirm for continued faithfulness and because of the great dangers and costs, grant continuation of privileges, liberties, immunities, exemptions and customs as regards persons, goods and monies, including heirs and successors. Granted by us and our heirs.	
1414	Henry V	✓	✓	✓	✓	Confirm for continued faithfulness and because of the great dangers and costs, grant continuation of privileges, liberties, immunities, exemptions and customs as regards persons, goods and monies, including heirs and successors. Granted by us and our heirs.	
1442	Henry VI	✓	✓	✓	✓	Confirm for continued faithfulness and because of the great dangers and costs, grant continuation of privileges, liberties, immunities, exemptions and customs as regards persons, goods and monies, including heirs and successors. Granted by us and our heirs.	GG
1465	Edward IV	✓	✓	✓	✓	Confirm for continued faithfulness and because of the great dangers and costs, grant continuation of privileges, liberties, immunities, exemptions and customs as regards persons, goods and monies, and to be free of all tolls, duties and customs in Kingdom of England, provided the loyalty continues, including heirs and successors. Granted by us and our heirs.	GG
1469	Edward IV	✗	✓	✓	✓	Confirm for continued faithfulness and because of the great dangers and costs, and in addition, for the recapture of Mont Orgueil castle, grant its peoples and communities to be free of all tolls, duties, customs, subsidies, pontages, panages, murages, tallages, fossages and other dues in the Kingdom of England and all our lands and islands, provided the loyalty continues, and to have all their rights, liberties and franchises free without fine or fee, including heirs and successors. Granted by us and our heirs.	
1470	Edward IV	✓	✓	✗	✗	Edward IV accepts £2,833.6s.8d from Guernsey and Jersey as recompense for recapturing Jersey and Mont Orgueil.	
1483	Richard III	✓	✓	✓	✓	Confirm for continued faithfulness and because of the great dangers and costs, grant continuation of privileges, liberties, immunities, exemptions and customs as regards persons, goods and monies, and to be free of all tolls, duties and customs in Kingdom of England, provided the loyalty continues, including heirs and successors. Granted by us and our heirs.	GG
1485	Henry VII	✗	✓	✓	✓	Confirm for continued faithfulness and because of the great dangers and costs, and for the recapture of Mont Orgueil castle, grant its peoples and communities to be free of all tolls, duties, customs and expand to include subsidies, pontages, panages, murages, tallages, fossages and other dues in the Kingdom of England and all our lands and islands, provided the loyalty continues, and to have all their rights, liberties and franchises free without fine or fee, including heirs and successors. Granted by us and our heirs.	GG
1494	Henry VII	✓	✗	✗	✗	Charter to reconcile division between Governor and peoples of Jersey and suppress oppression of population, confirming only Jurats could confine a prisoner, except for treason and the governor had no jurisdiction in Jersey, secular or ecclesiastical.	
1510	Henry VIII	✗	✓	✓	✓	Confirm for continued faithfulness and because of the great dangers and costs, and for the recapture of Mont Orgueil castle, grant its peoples and communities to be free of all tolls, duties, customs, subsidies, pontages, panages, murages, tallages, fossages and other dues in the Kingdom of England and all our lands and islands, provided the loyalty continues, and to have all their rights, liberties and franchises free without fine or fee, including heirs and successors. Granted by us and our heirs.	GG
1548	Edward VI	✓	✓	✓	✓	Confirm for continued faithfulness and because of the great dangers and costs, and for the recapture of Mont Orgueil castle, grant its peoples and communities to be free of all tolls, duties, customs, subsidies, pontages, panages, murages, tallages, fossages and other dues in the Kingdom of England and all our lands and islands, provided the loyalty continues, and to have all their rights, liberties and franchises free without fine or fee, including heirs and successors. Additions: As regards exporting wheat a limit of 12d per quarter duty and for wool 3s 6d per 150 pounds. As regards use of Islands by foreign shipping during time of war, without condemnation or interference (making Islands neutral). Granted by us and our heirs.	
1553	Mary I	✗	✓	✓	✓	Confirm for continued faithfulness and because of the great dangers and costs, and for the recapture of Mont Orgueil castle, grant its peoples and communities to be free of all tolls, duties, customs, subsidies, pontages, panages, murages, tallages, fossages and other dues in the Kingdom of England and all our lands and islands, provided the loyalty continues, and to have all their rights, liberties and franchises free without fine or fee, including heirs and successors. Granted by us and our heirs.	GG
1559	Elizabeth I	✗	✓	✓	✓	Confirm for continued faithfulness and because of the great dangers and costs, and for the recapture of Mont Orgueil castle, grant its peoples and communities to be free of all theolonian taxes, customs, subsidies, pontages, panages, murages, tallages, fossages in the Kingdom of England and all our lands and islands, provided the loyalty continues, and to have all their rights, liberties and franchises free without fine or fee, including heirs and successors. Granted by us and our heirs.	GG
1560	Elizabeth I	✗	✓	✓	✓	In recognition of the faithfulness, obedience and service and regarding the various rights granted by previous Monarchs, grant the following rights: Its peoples and communities to be free of all tributes, tolls, customs, subsidies, hidage, taylage, pontage, panage, murage, fossage, works, and warlike expeditions (except in the event of the Monarch is held in prison) and of all other contributions whether given by charter, grant or other method in the Kingdom of England and all our provinces, dominions and territories. In time of war, merchant ships from all nations may shelter and trade in the Islands without danger in remaining or departing to their ships, persons or goods, within sight of the Islands. The bailiffs, jurats and magistrates rights to uphold the laws and hear pleadings, except for the ancient right of royal appeal. The bailiff, jurats and peoples of the Islands shall not be forced to appear before any court in the Kingdom of England for any reason other than by Royal determination. Confirmation of rights, jurisdictions, immunities, impunities, indemnities, exemptions, liberties, franchises and privileges given to bailiff, jurats, people and merchants, irrespective of place of birth. Saving the allegiance, subjection and obedience of all Islanders irrespective of length of time in the islands and the regalities, privileges, incomes, revenues, tributes and other rights due to the Monarch. The right to seek further letters patent without payment to the hanaper. Granted by us and our heirs.	GG
1562	Elizabeth I	✓	✗	✗	✗	Confirmation of previous charters and additions: Exemption of all taxes and duties unless the Sovereign is in prison. Confirmation of jurisdiction of Jersey Royal Court on civil and criminal matters. That the peoples of the Island shall not be forced to appear before any court in the Kingdom of England for any reason other than by Royal determination.	
1565	Elizabeth I	✗	✗	✗	✓	Charter granting Fief of Sark to Hellier de Carteret on payment of 50 shillings a year provided supplying at least 40 men armed with muskets to defend the island.	GG
1604 (Apr)	James I	✓	✗	✗	✗	Confirms previous rights including the rights to local justice, not allowing English writs to apply to islanders, non local inhabitants and merchants are also protected, levy of 12 pence on a quarter of grain and 3/6d per pound of wool. Free commerce in time of war and exemption from duties and tolls.	
1604 (Dec)	James I	✗	✓	✓	✓	Confirms Charter of 1560. Granted by us and our heirs.	GG
1605	James I	✗	✓	✓	✓	Adds to Charter of 1560: Free of any custom, subsidy, tonnage or poundage on goods growing, coming from, made or produced in islands and taken to realm of England. To continue to charge a pettie Custume on imports to Guernsey to pay for the harbour development and public works. The continuing right to weigh and measure merchandise and to charge fees, for an annual rent of twenty shillings.	GG
1627	Charles I	✗	✓	✓	✓	Adds to Charter of 1605: Inclusion of "incorporations" regarding customs. Giving all lands and incomes previously given to churches, schools and hospitals to the bailiff, jurats and people of Guernsey, to be used solely for the benefit of the churches, schools and hospitals. To continue providing Castle Cornet in Guernsey with victuals, including 100 tuns (1 tun holds 252 gallons) of beer, 600 flitches of bacon, 1,200 pounds of butter etc. in exchange for the rights to import 500 tuns of beer, 50 dickers (a dicker is 10 hides) of leather, 25 dozen calueskinnes (parchment) and 500 toddes of wool (a tod is 28lbs). To import items needed for Castle Cornet from England without taxes, but needing written requisition from the castle. To import other goods, except munitions up to a value of £150 of duty, duty free and limiting ports.	GG
1668	Charles II	✗	✓	✓	✓	Reconfirms Charter of 1627.	GG
1687	James II	✓	✗	✗	✗	Confirms privileges granted to Jersey by James I and granting further liberties.	

- GG – Charter held in Guernsey Greffe

== See also ==
- Law of Guernsey
- Law of Jersey
- Constitution of Jersey
