= Castle Cornet =

Island castle in Guernsey

Coordinates: 49°27′10.79″N 2°31′34.8″W

- Part of Guernsey, Channel Islands
- Saint Peter Port Harbour, Saint Peter Port
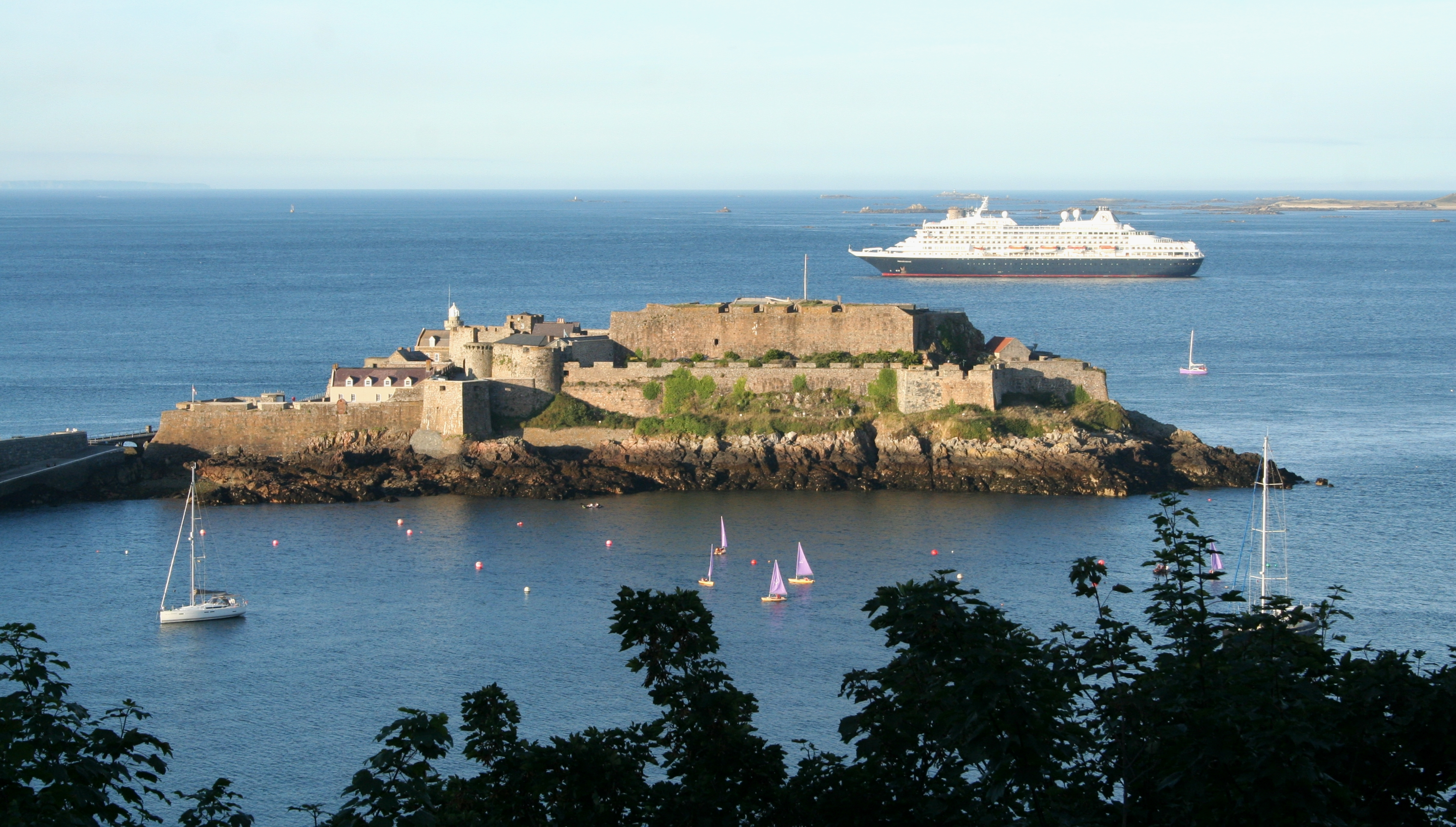
- Castle Cornet stands on the former tidal island of Little Roussel.

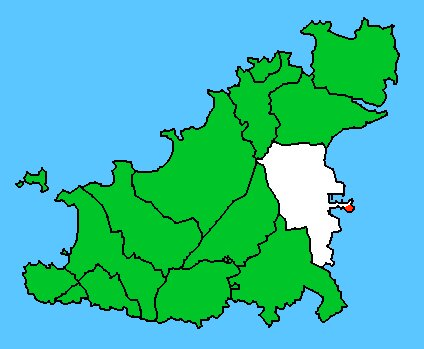
- Location of Cornet Rock (red) within Saint Peter Port (white)

Site information
- Type: Norman castle with keep
- Owner: Bailiwick of Guernsey
- Open to the public: Yes
- Condition: Partially restored

Location
- Height: Up to 13 metres (43 ft)

Site history
- Built: c. 1206–1256
- In use: Until mid 19th century
- Materials: Diorite Ashlar; Mortar; Timber
- Battles/wars: French Invasion of 1338; English Civil War
- Events: Hundred Years' War; Napoleonic Wars; German Occupation of Guernsey

Castle Cornet is a large island castle in Guernsey, and former tidal island, also known as Cornet Rock or Castle Rock. Its importance was as a defence not only of the island, but of the roadstead. In 1859, it became part of one of the breakwaters of Guernsey's main harbour, St Peter Port harbour.

== Geography ==
The island measures about 2 hectares (4.9 acres) in area, with a length of 175 metres (574 ft) and a width of 130 metres (430 ft). It lies not quite 600 metres (2,000 ft) east of the coast of Guernsey.

== History ==
Formerly a tidal island, like Lihou on the west coast of Guernsey, it was first fortified as a castle between 1206 and 1256, following the division of the Duchy of Normandy in 1204. The wardenship of Geoffrey de Lucy (1225–26), has been identified as a time of fortification in the Channel Islands: timber and lead was sent from England for castle building in Guernsey and Jersey. At that time the structure consisted of a keep, a chapel, two courtyards, and curtain walls. In 1338, when a French force captured the island, they besieged Cornet, capturing it on 8 September; the French then massacred the garrison of eleven men at arms and 50 archers. The island was retaken in 1340, and the castle was recaptured in August 1345, after a three-day attack by professional soldiers and the local militia. The French had spent their seven-year occupation improving the defences, including probably the barbican. In 1358, the French returned and again captured the castle, but they were evicted the following year and an island traitor was executed.

In 1372, Owain Lawgoch, a claimant to the Welsh throne, leading a free company on behalf of France, attacked Guernsey in an assault popularly called "La Descente des Aragousais". Owain Lawgoch withdrew after killing 400 of the island militia, but without capturing the besieged Castle Cornet, which he found strong and well supplied with artillery. In yet another assault the French again captured the castle in 1380, before island forces again evicted them a short time later. In the early fifteenth century improvements were made: the Carey tower was constructed around 1435. A French assault in 1461, was repulsed.

The construction costs for works, repairs, maintenance, and the garrison were met from revenues raised in the island by the Warden (sometimes called "Keeper of the Castle") under royal warrant.

The advent of cannon and gunpowder led to the castle being remodelled (1545 and 1548). In 1547, the French, having captured Sark, descended on Guernsey; they met with gunfire from off St Peter Port and bombardment from cannon at the Castle. Additional building works took place. Prof. John Le Patourel mentions in The Building of Castle Cornet that in 1566, iron and hammers were taken to "Creavissham" (Crevichon), and that the island was quarried for materials for the castle. Sand was brought from Herm. In 1594, the "Royal Battery" was completed, as was the Sutlers house, and bastions of improved, polygonal form were constructed.

Sir Walter St John drowned whilst staying at the castle in August 1597.

In 1627, King Charles I reduced the Crown's cost of running Castle Cornet by granting additional rights to Guernsey in a charter, in return for which the island became responsible for supplying victuals to the castle, including annual amounts of 100 tuns (1 tun holds 252 gallons) of beer, 600 flitches of bacon, 1,200 pounds of butter, 20 whey (around 4,600 pounds) of cheese, 3,000 stockfish, 300 pounds of tallow, twelve bulls, wood and coal.

=== English Civil War ===
During the first, second and third English Civil Wars (1642–1651), the Castle had four commanders. The castle supported the Royalist cause whilst the Island of Guernsey supported the Parliamentarian cause, Sir Peter Osborne closing the Castle on 14 March 1642. Throughout the siege, the Castle cannon fired on the town of St Peter Port, reducing many buildings and forcing the Royal Court to relocate to Elizabeth College. It is estimated that ten thousand cannonballs were fired at the town during this period.

The island commanders (commissioners) were captured on a ship and taken to the castle. Imprisoned in the Carey tower, they made a rope out of flax, escaped from the tower, and returned at low tide to the island.

In 1651, Parliamentarian forces took the Island of Jersey, which was Royalist. Ensign Nicholas Robert from Saint Martin, Guernsey was with the Parliamentarian forces. While there, he recovered the Crown of England that had belonged to Charles I from the Court House in Jersey and brought it back to Guernsey, delivering it to the Governor of Castle Cornet.

For nine years the Castle held out, supported from the Royalist Island of Jersey. Two years after the execution of Charles I, while under the command of Colonel Roger Burges, the Castle surrendered on 17 December 1651. The garrison of 55 were permitted to march out bearing arms and to leave the Island. The royal Crown was returned to London. Castle Cornet was the penultimate Royalist garrison in the British Isles to surrender.

=== Later developments ===
The castle was a prison for Civil War parliamentary leader, Colonel John Lambert from 1662 to 1670.

It also served as official residence of the governor of Guernsey until 30 December 1672, when the keep was catastrophically destroyed. A bolt of lightning struck the magazine of the castle, destroying the keep and a number of living quarters. The Governor at the time was Lord Hatton. The explosion killed his mother, wife, and a number of members of staff. Thereafter the Governor of the island lived on the island rather than in the Castle. The tower was not rebuilt.

The Castle was upgraded during the Napoleonic Wars period, with additional barracks. Its use as the sole prison in the island ceased with the construction of a prison at St James Street in 1811. The castle also became integrated into the breakwater from the island after the war.

Along the breakwater, a pond for toy yachts was constructed in 1887, for Queen Victoria's Golden Jubilee.

The castle was used as a prison from earliest times up until the end of World War II. During World War II, a small garrison of German troops occupied the castle, which they called Hafenschloss ("Harbour Castle"). The occupiers undertook concrete modifications to the castle to suit modern warfare. After the War, in 1947, the Crown presented the castle to the people of Guernsey, as a token of their loyalty during two world wars.

== Description ==
Constructed over a period of 800 years, on a small islet, there is little order in its construction.

There are six gateways to negotiate to get to the citadel at the top.

The main gate is concealed from cannon fire from the island. The coat of arms above the gate is that of Queen Elizabeth I. The original curtain wall was built around 1570, but has been refaced to strengthen it since.

The Outer Ward reached through the main gate with its portcullis. A barrack block on the right was built in the 18th century and a 19th-century guard room. The second curtain wall behind dated from the English Civil War period. At the top of the ward is another gate, which twists to make assault harder.

The Barbican is the outermost part of the medieval castle dating from the mid 13th century. The arches inside allow defenders above to attack people below with missiles and liquids, such a quick lime and liquid lead. Another portcullis. Some of the walls here are made of poor materials, small stones and may have been built by the French when they were under siege around 1345. A passageway and another sharp turn to stop the use of a battering ram. A drawbridge and the original entrance to the 13th century Castle. A vaulted passageway with a tower on top, the original gatehouse later used as the town prison. The passageway became the "prisoners walk".

The Citadel, which had yet another portcullis and door at the entrance, and there are considerable works dating from the 1940-45 German occupation period. The top held a square tower from which three Parliamentarians escaped in 1643. Many of the defensive walls in this area were built in the 16th century.

At the top there used to exist the round tower that was destroyed in the explosion of 1672, that killed seven including the Governor's wife, Lady Hatton and some children. The medieval Tour Carré can be seen together with the Gunners Tower and its medieval courtyard. The married quarters barracks were built around 1750. The Sutler's House is the oldest domestic building, having escaped the 1672 explosion. The hospital in the Inner Bailey was built in 1746. The north-east corner of the Castle hold the Royal Battery, built around 1575. It is from the curtain battery that the noon day gun is fired.

== Present day ==
The castle, with its 800-year history, is itself a museum. Inside, it incorporates the following four additional museums:

- The Story of Castle Cornet
- Maritime Museum
- 201 Squadron RAF Museum
- Royal Guernsey Militia Museum – including artifacts from the Royal Guernsey Light Infantry

Every day (except for a few months in winter) at noon, a cannon is fired.

There is a restaurant, four period gardens, guided tours and the castle hosts outdoor theatre performances during the summer months.

== Protection ==
The whole of Castel Cornet and the islet upon which it stands was listed as a Protected Monument on 26 March 1938, reference PM74.

== Gallery ==
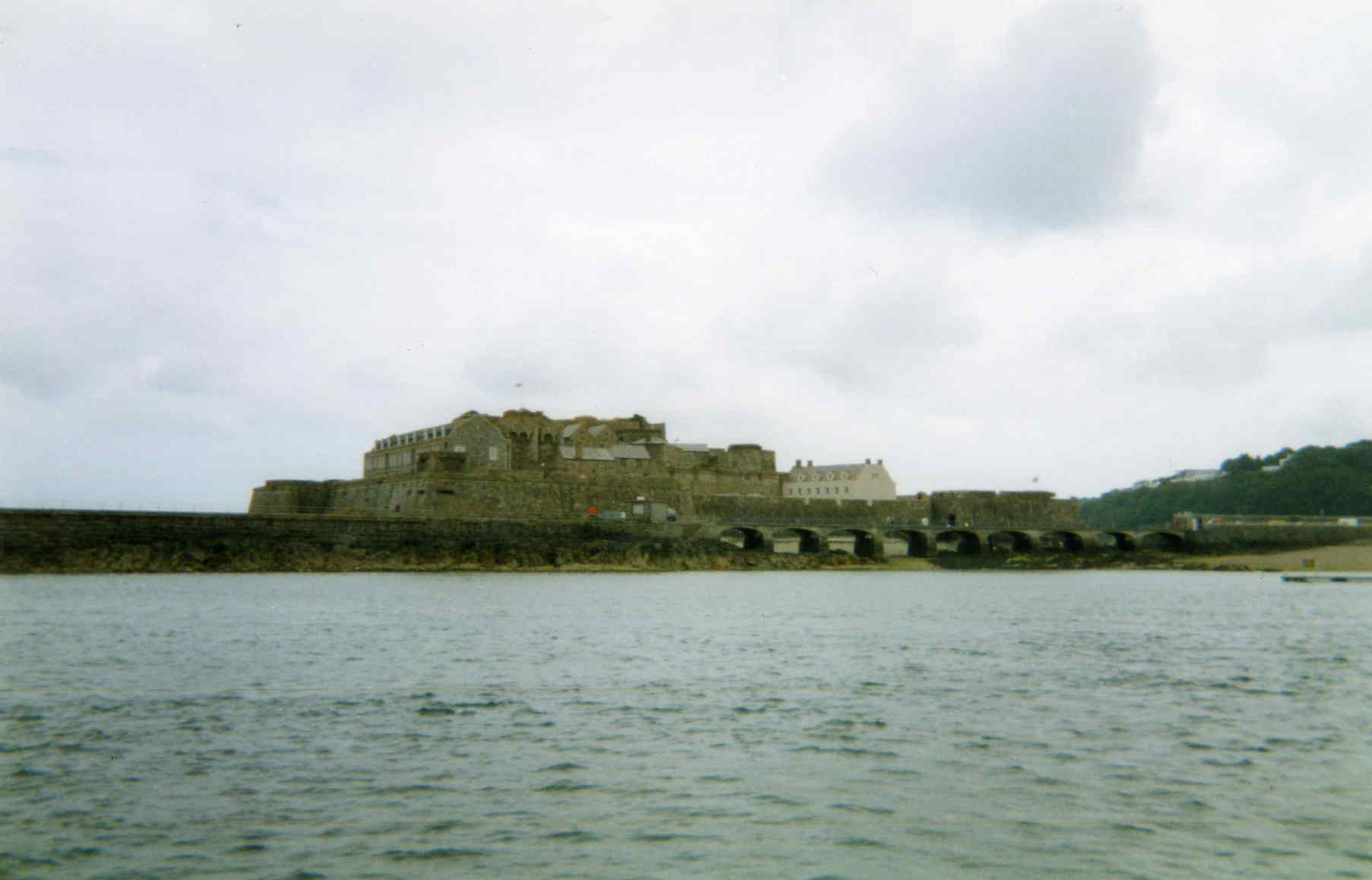
Castle Cornet has guarded the approaches to St. Peter Port since the 13th century

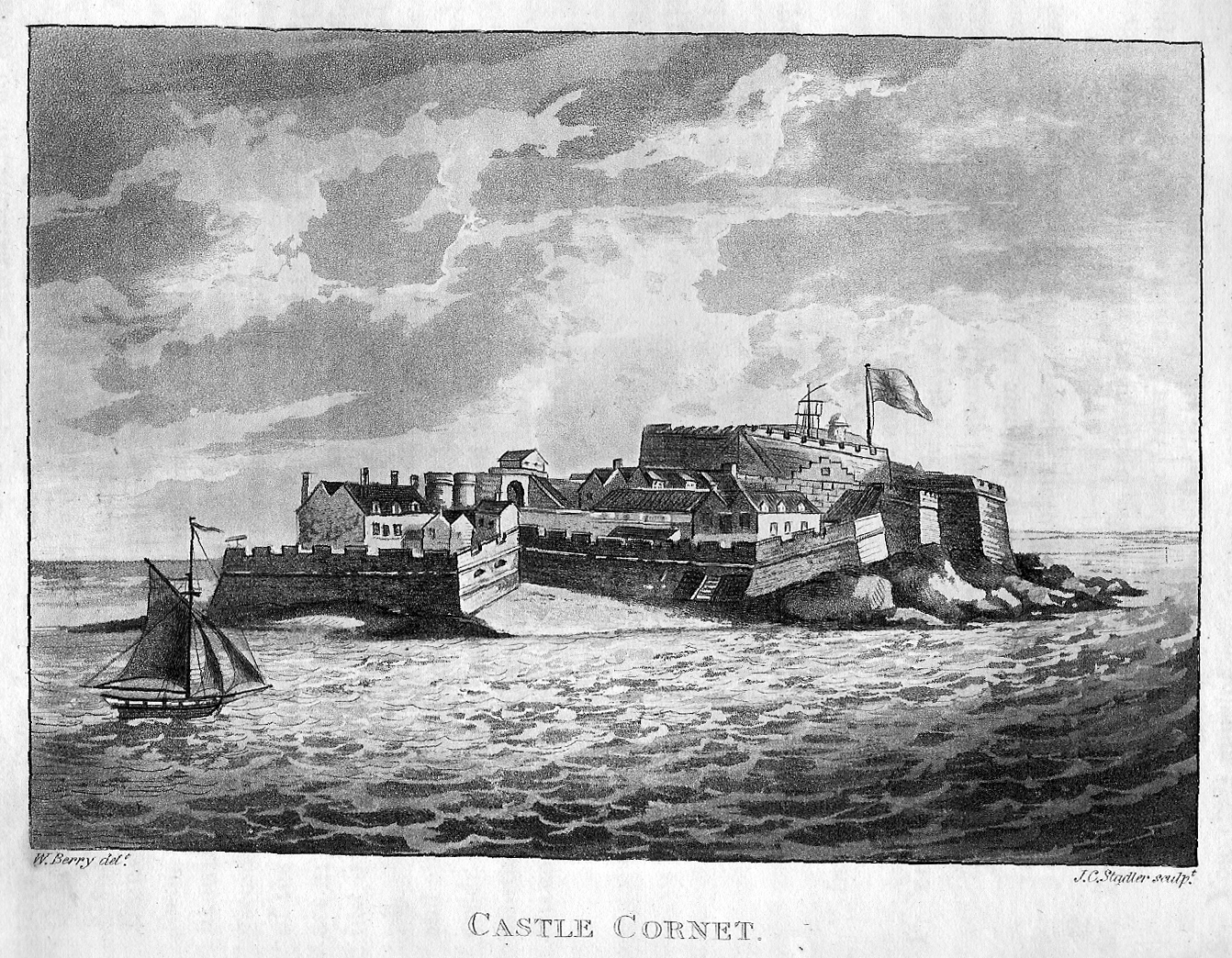
An old print of Castle Cornet c. 1814.

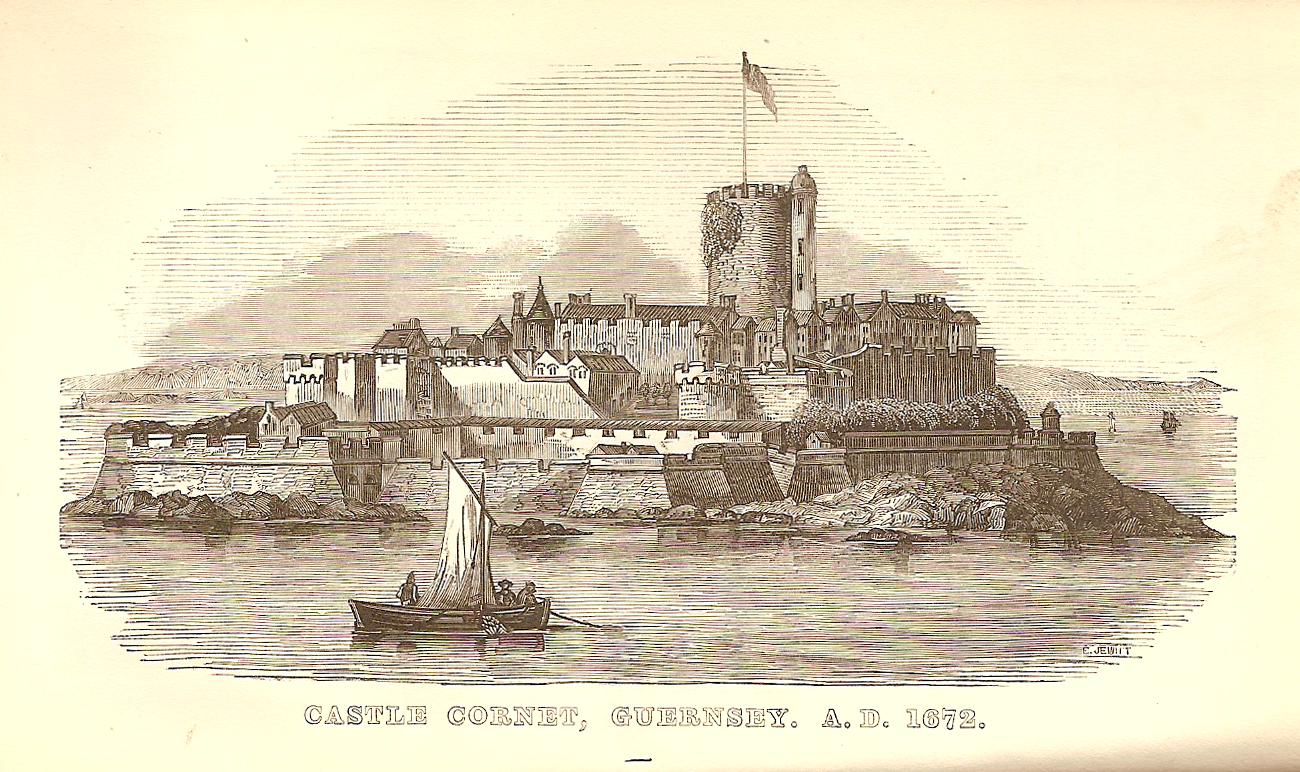
A 1672 engraving of Castle Cornet showing the keep that was destroyed by an explosion later that year.

== See also ==
- Royal Guernsey Militia
- Royal Guernsey Light Infantry
- History of Guernsey
