= 13.5 cm K 09 =

13.5 cm Kanone 09
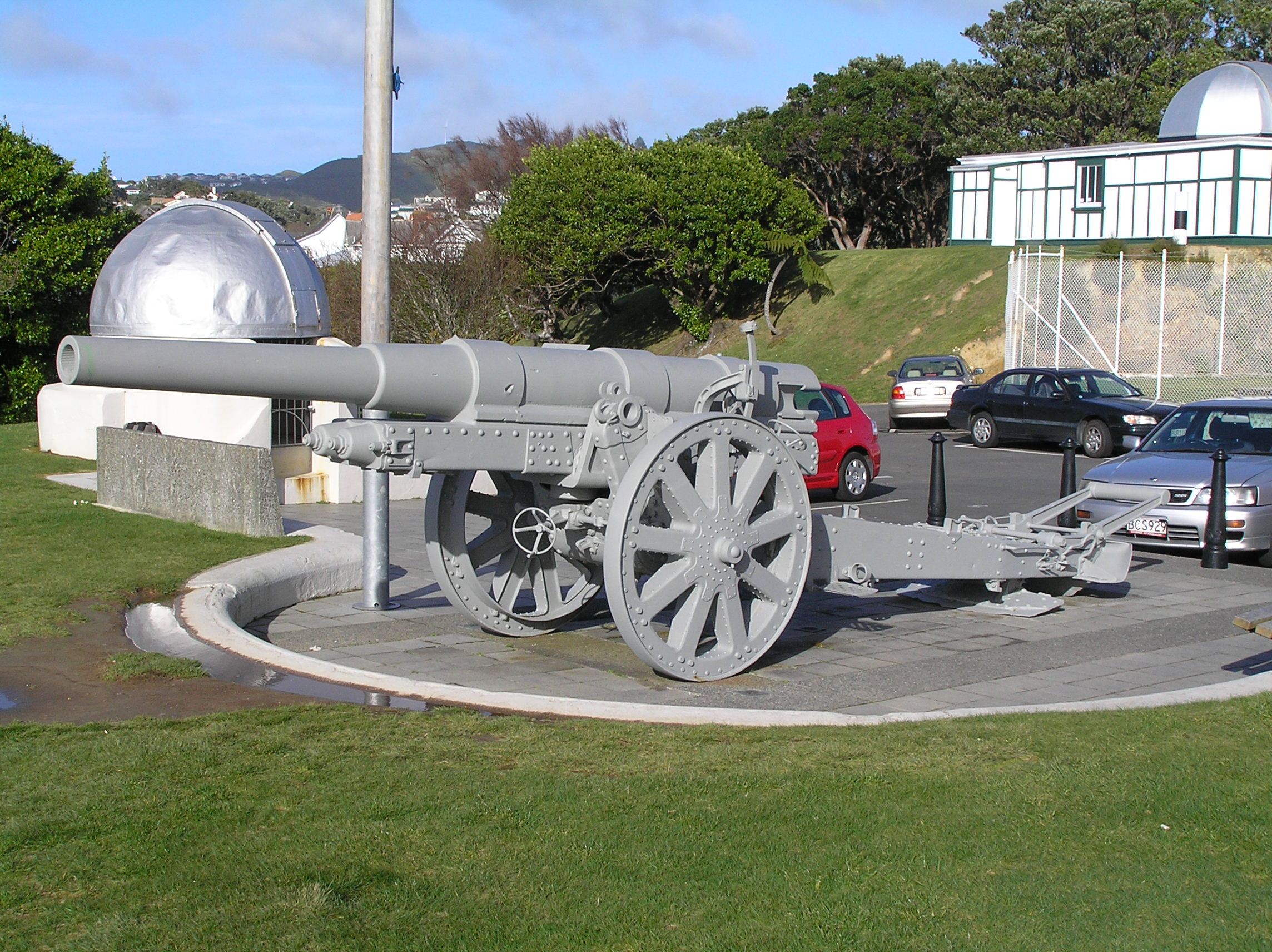
- Surviving Krupp 13.5cm K09 Field Gun in the Wellington Botanic Garden
- Type: Heavy field gun
- Place of origin: German Empire

Service history
- Used by: German Empire
- Wars: World War I

Production history
- Designer: Krupp
- Manufacturer: Krupp
- No. built: about 190

Specifications
- Mass: Travel: 7,847 kg (17,300 lb); Combat: 6,730 kg (14,840 lb)
- Length: 8.2 m (26 ft 11 in)
- Barrel length: 5.4 m (17 ft 9 in) (L/35.6)
- Width: 1.92 m (6 ft 4 in)
- Shell: Separate loading, cased charge and projectile
- Shell weight: 42 kg (93 lb)
- Caliber: 135 mm (5.3 in)
- Breech: Horizontal sliding-block
- Recoil: Hydro-pneumatic 1.42 m (4 ft 8 in)
- Carriage: Box trail
- Elevation: -5° to +26°
- Traverse: 4°
- Rate of fire: 3 rpm
- Muzzle velocity: 695 m/s (2,280 ft/s)
- Maximum firing range: 16.5 km (10.3 mi)

The 13.5 cm Kanone 09 (13.5 cm K 09) was a heavy breech-loading field artillery gun used by Germany in World War I. Built by Friedrich Krupp AG, in Essen, Germany, this gun was intended to supplement the 10 cm K 04. Only four of the sixteen built were in service at the outbreak of the war. It was withdrawn from service in 1915 as it was deemed to be too much gun for too little shell, but it was returned to service later in the war when the Allied blockade began to affect German ammunition production.

== Technical details ==
The breech was a horizontal Krupp guide shaft breech, the shell and propellant charge were separated. The hydraulic recoil brake had a maximum stopping distance of 1.42 m, and the mount was a one-piece box spar mount. The gun fired using wheeled belts and was easily maneuverable off-road.

== War trophies ==
One of these guns was captured during the Battle of the Canal du Nord, on 29 September 1918, by the New Zealand Division. Two battalions of the Wellington Regiment were engaged in this action, which was part of an Allied attack on the Hindenburg Line. At the end of the war, the captured gun, Nr 4, and many other captured German weapons were sent to New Zealand as war trophies. In 1920, Nr 4 was given to the city of Wellington in honor of its soldiers. The gun, believed to be one of a few remaining in existence, is currently on public display in the Wellington Botanic Garden.

In 1921 the Channel Island of Guernsey received its share of the Allies' spoils of war, four K09 Kanon. Displayed near Victoria Tower in Saint Peter Port until in 1938 two having badly deteriorated, were scrapped. The remaining two were quickly buried in 1940 before the Island was occupied by German forces. Forgotten about, they were dug up in 1978 and are now again on display next to Victoria Tower.
