= Saint Peter Port =

Capital of the island of Guernsey

St. Peter Port Saint-Pierre-Port
- Parish
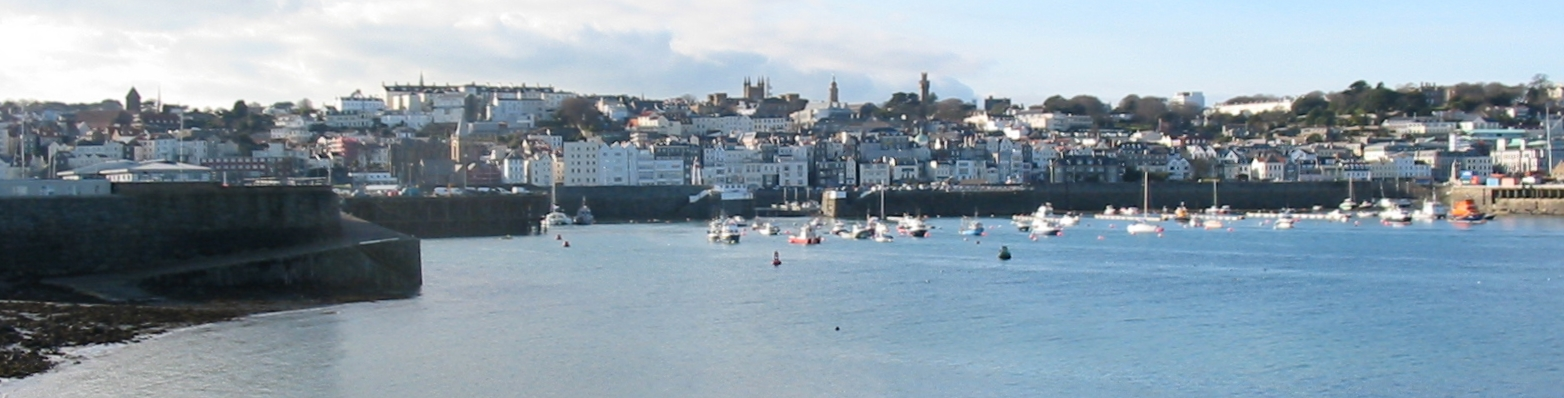
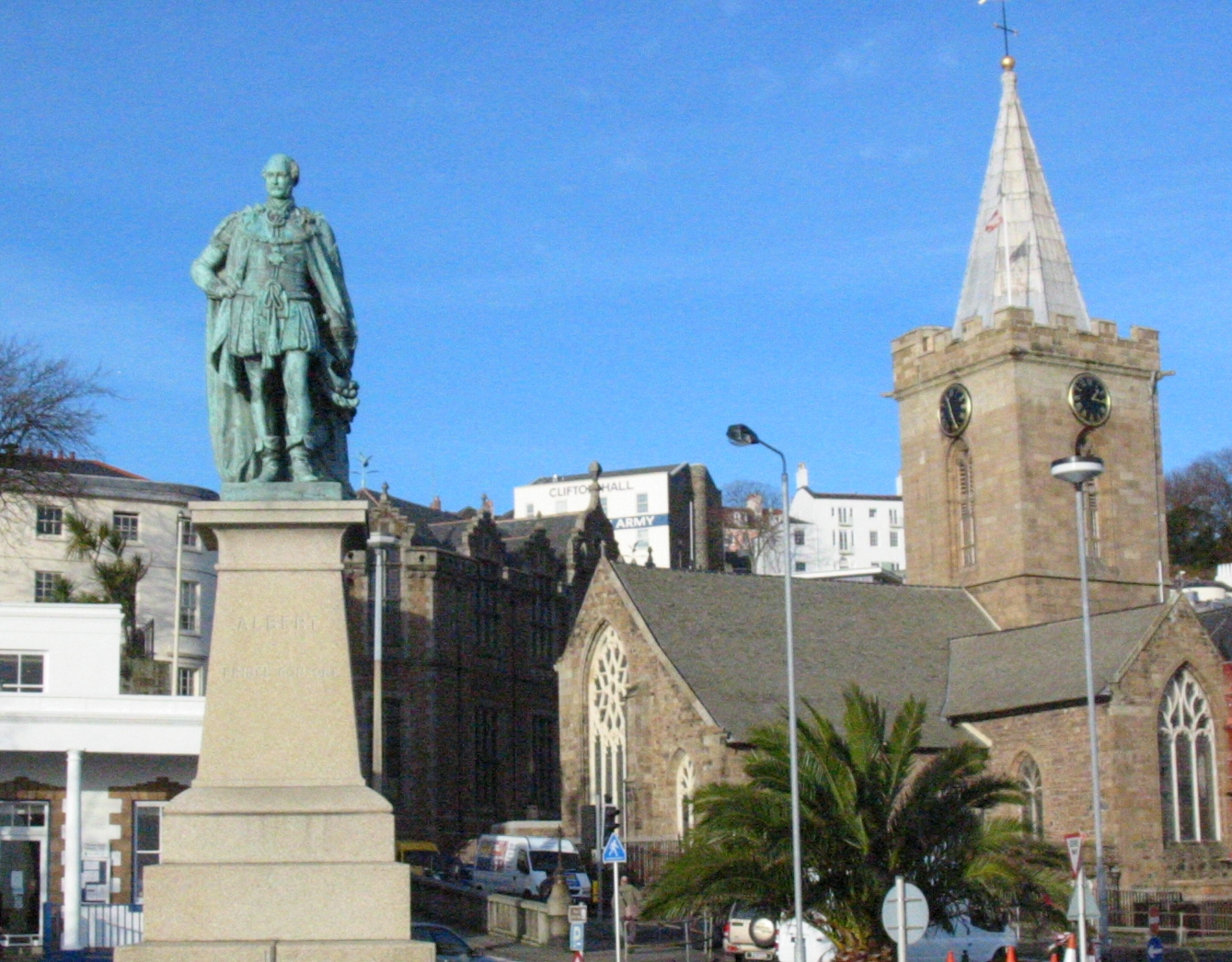
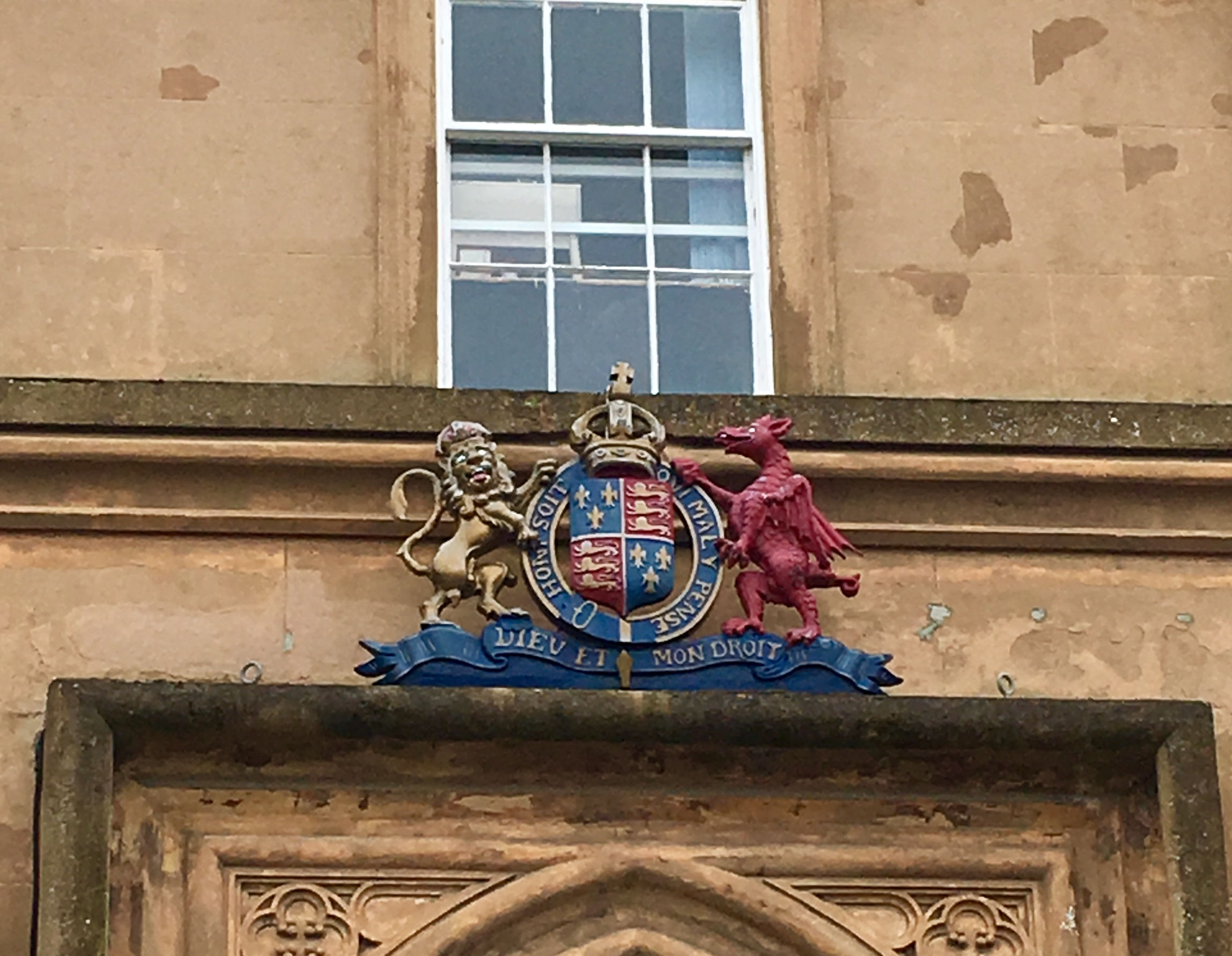
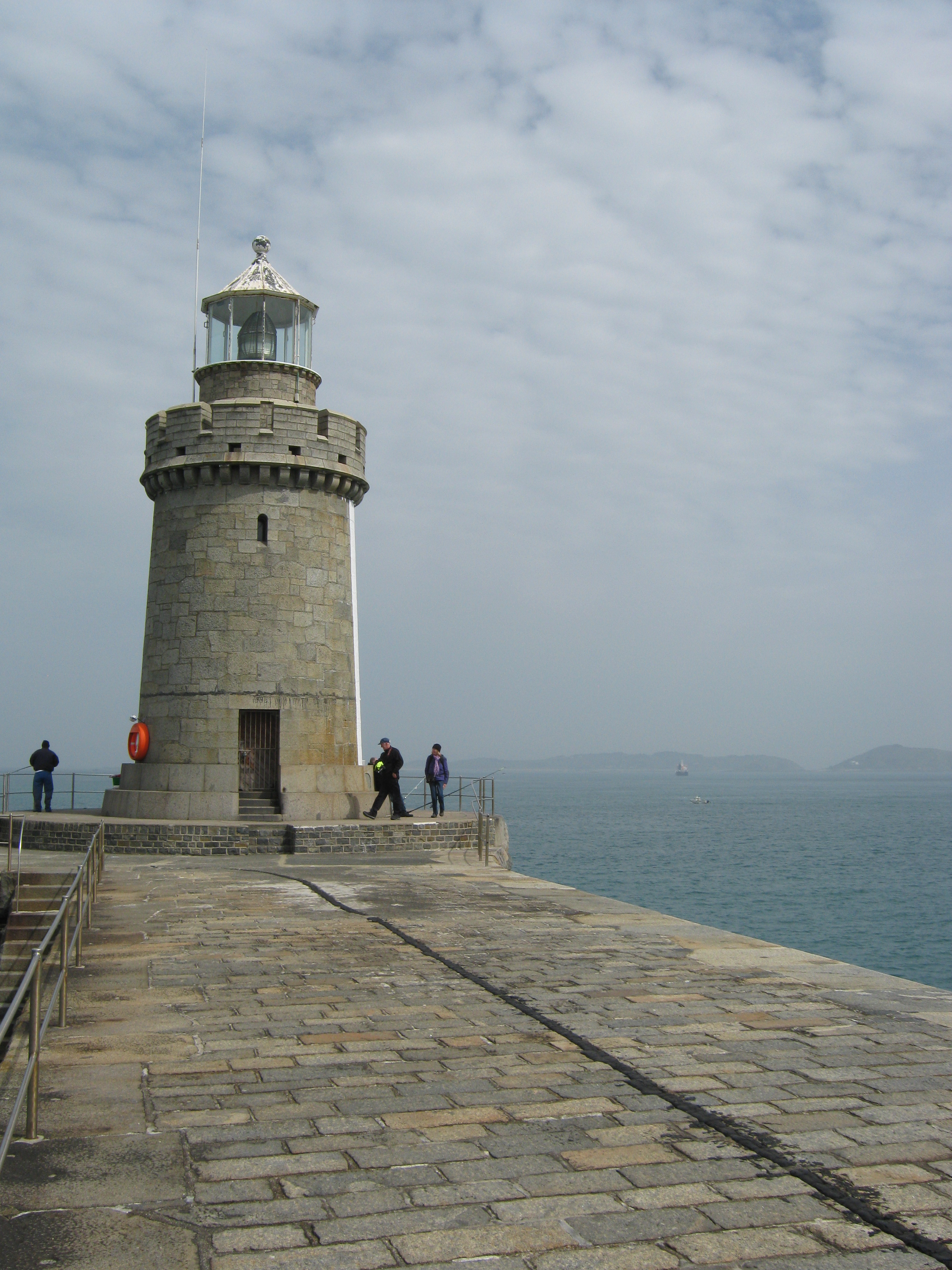
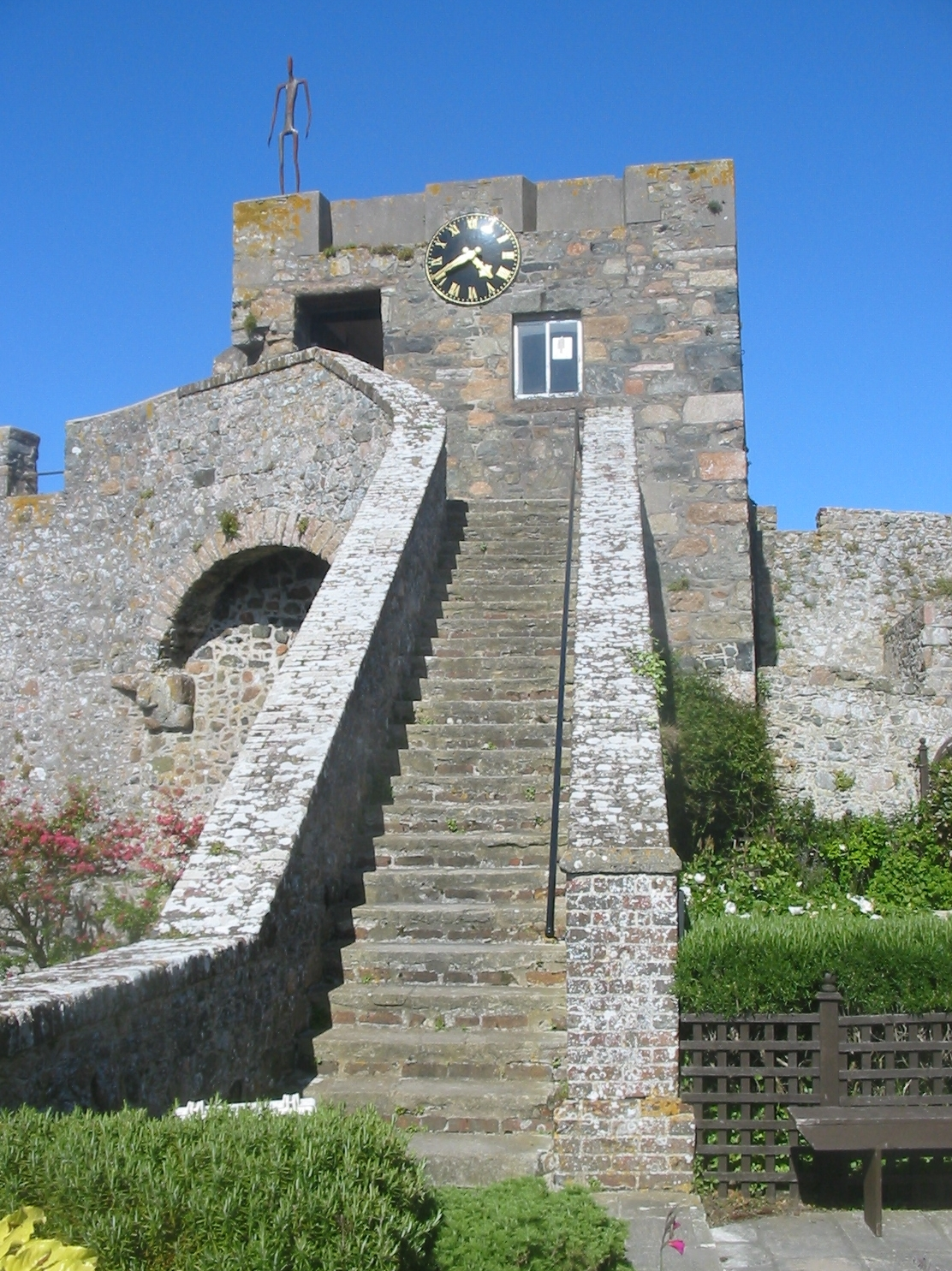
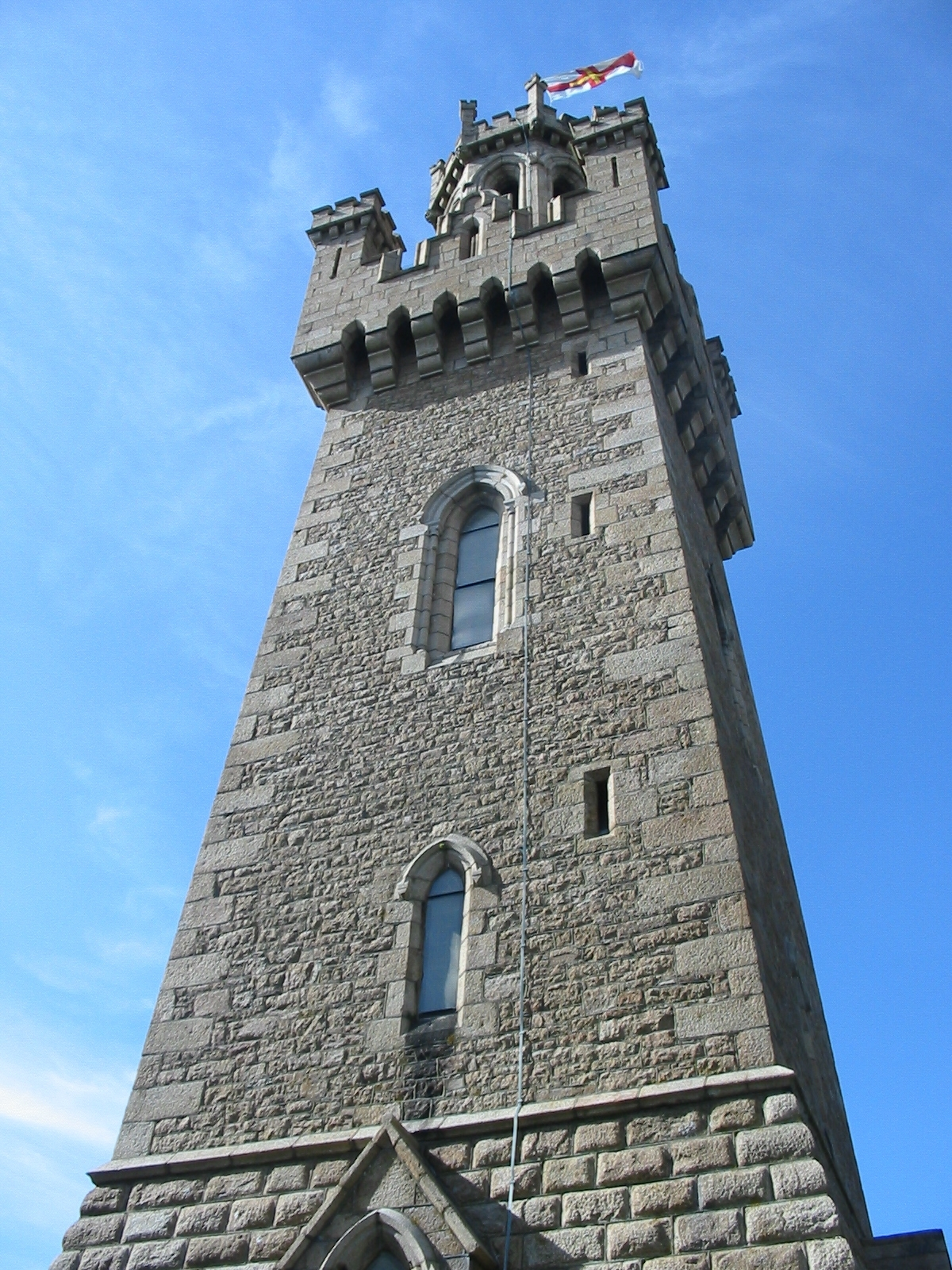
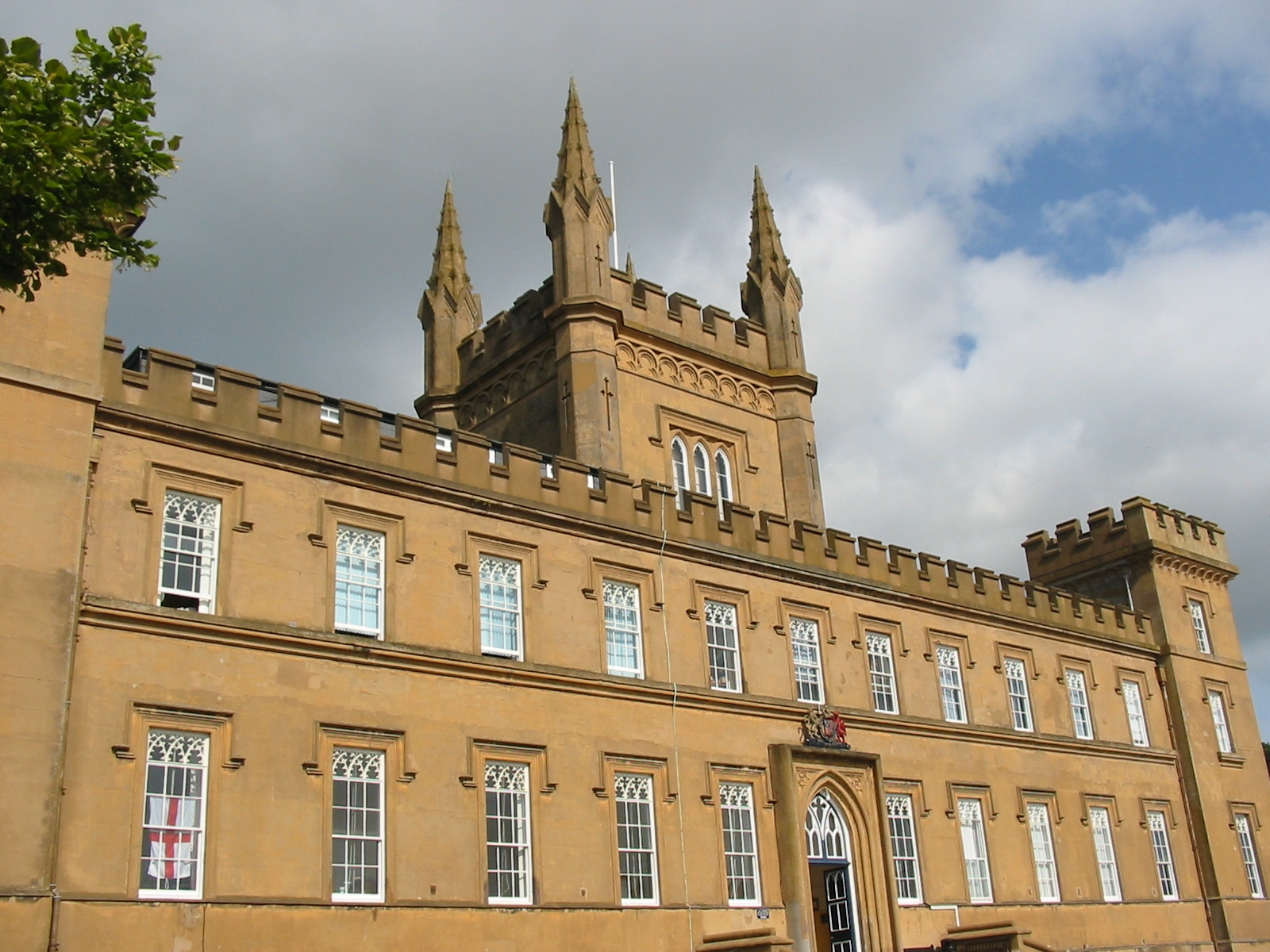
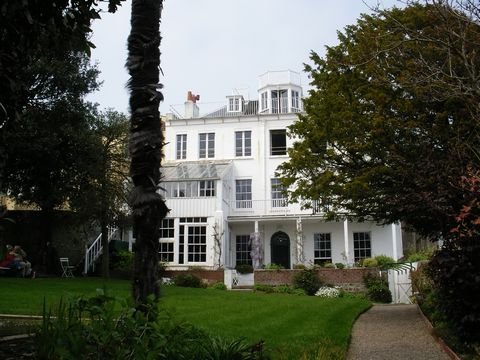
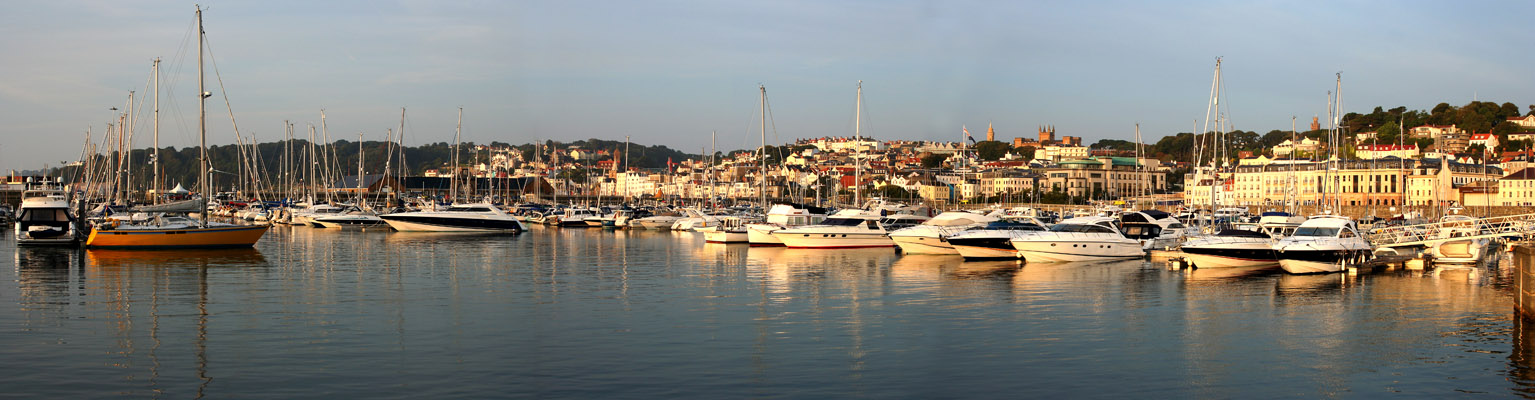
- Saint Peter Port, Town Church, Elizabeth College entrance, Castle Pier Lighthouse, Castle Cornet, Victoria Tower, Elizabeth College building, Hauteville House, QE2 Marina

- Flag

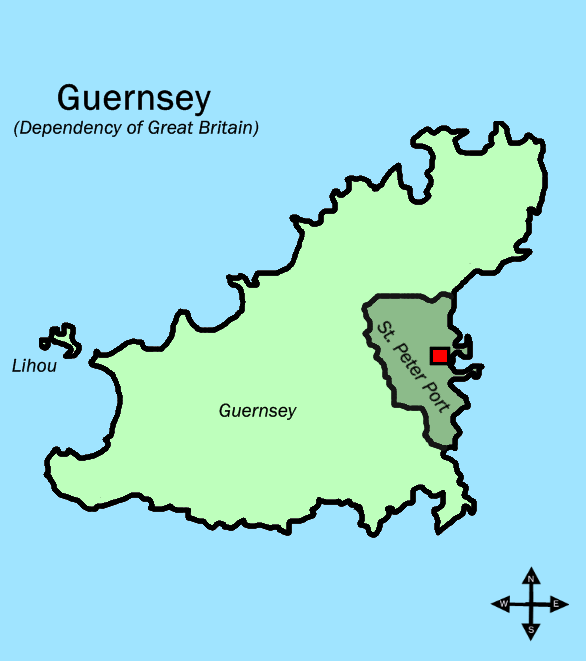
- Location of Saint Peter Port on Guernsey, in the Channel Islands
- Coordinates: 49.4555°N 2.5368°W
- Crown Dependency: Bailiwick of Guernsey

Government
  - Electoral district: Divided into St Peter Port North and St Peter Port South

Area
  - Total: 6.5 km^{2} (2.5 sq mi)
- Elevation: 0 m (0 ft)

Population (2021)
  - Total: 19,295
  - Density: 3,000/km^{2} (7,700/sq mi)
- Time zone: GMT
  - Summer (DST): UTC+01
- Postal code: GY1
- Website: www.stppcons.com

St. Peter Port (French: Saint-Pierre Port) is a town and one of the ten parishes on the island of Guernsey in the Channel Islands. It is the capital of the Bailiwick of Guernsey as well as the main port. The population in 2021 was 19,295.

St. Peter Port is a small town (commonly referred to by locals as just "town") consisting mostly of steep, narrow streets and steps on the overlooking slopes. It is known that a trading post/town existed here before Roman times with a pre-Christian name which has not survived.

The parish covers an area of 6.5 km^{2}. The postal code for addresses in the parish starts with GY1.

People from St. Peter Port were nicknamed "les Villais" (the townspeople) or "cllichards" in Guernésiais.

== Geography ==
St. Peter Port is on the east coast of Guernsey overlooking Herm and the tiny Jethou; a further channel separates Sark and surrounding islets such as Brecqhou; Normandy's long Cotentin Peninsula and, to the south-east, Jersey are visible in very clear conditions from some of the town's highest vantage points. The parish borders St. Sampson in the north, The Vale in the north-west, St. Andrew in the west and St. Martin in the south.

== Toponymy ==
This is a medieval toponymic formation meaning "port of Saint-Pierre."

Contrary to local belief, the form Saint-Pierre-Port, rather than *Port-Saint-Pierre, is not linked to a modern English influence but reflects the word order (determinative + appellative) characteristic of ancient place names in most of the Normandy region, which is of Germanic and Anglo-Scandinavian origin. This is why Saint-Pierre-Port has the same name as an old Saint Pierre Port (Normandy, Seine-Maritime, Sancti Petri Portus around 1240, Saint Pierre port in 1319, Saint Pierreport in 1412, Saint Pierre Port in 1431), altered in the late 15th century to Saint-Pierre-en-Port.

This type of toponymic compound in -port is still found in Vatteport (Normandy, Eure, Vatteville, Vateport 1616) and Quenneport (Normandy, Seine-Maritime, Val-de-la-Haye, Quenzico porta 872-875, Cheineport 1203), etc. The English form Saint Peter Port is a translation of the initial form.

== Climate ==
St. Peter Port has an oceanic climate (Cfb) with mild summers and cool winters.

Climate data for St. Peter Port (2010-2020 normals, extremes 1947–present)
| Month | Jan | Feb | Mar | Apr | May | Jun | Jul | Aug | Sep | Oct | Nov | Dec | Year |
|---|---|---|---|---|---|---|---|---|---|---|---|---|---|
| Record high °C (°F) | 13.3 (55.9) | 15.0 (59.0) | 19.4 (66.9) | 24.3 (75.7) | 31.5 (88.7) | 30.8 (87.4) | 32.6 (90.7) | 34.3 (93.7) | 30.6 (87.1) | 23.6 (74.5) | 18.0 (64.4) | 15.6 (60.1) | 34.3 (93.7) |
| Mean daily maximum °C (°F) | 8.7 (47.7) | 8.4 (47.1) | 10.0 (50.0) | 12.6 (54.7) | 14.8 (58.6) | 17.6 (63.7) | 20.0 (68.0) | 19.5 (67.1) | 18.3 (64.9) | 15.4 (59.7) | 11.9 (53.4) | 10.1 (50.2) | 13.9 (57.0) |
| Daily mean °C (°F) | 7.4 (45.3) | 6.7 (44.1) | 7.9 (46.2) | 9.9 (49.8) | 12.1 (53.8) | 14.7 (58.5) | 17.0 (62.6) | 16.9 (62.4) | 15.8 (60.4) | 13.5 (56.3) | 10.4 (50.7) | 8.7 (47.7) | 11.8 (53.2) |
| Mean daily minimum °C (°F) | 5.9 (42.6) | 5.2 (41.4) | 5.8 (42.4) | 7.2 (45.0) | 9.4 (48.9) | 11.9 (53.4) | 14.0 (57.2) | 14.3 (57.7) | 13.3 (55.9) | 11.6 (52.9) | 8.9 (48.0) | 7.4 (45.3) | 9.6 (49.3) |
| Record low °C (°F) | −7.8 (18.0) | −7.2 (19.0) | −2.2 (28.0) | −1.4 (29.5) | 0.1 (32.2) | 5.4 (41.7) | 8.3 (46.9) | 9.2 (48.6) | 5.8 (42.4) | 3.5 (38.3) | −0.8 (30.6) | −3.8 (25.2) | −7.8 (18.0) |
| Average precipitation mm (inches) | 90.7 (3.57) | 73.1 (2.88) | 50.5 (1.99) | 38.9 (1.53) | 43.6 (1.72) | 37.8 (1.49) | 33.3 (1.31) | 53.6 (2.11) | 52.3 (2.06) | 82.5 (3.25) | 97.8 (3.85) | 99.5 (3.92) | 753.6 (29.67) |
| Average precipitation days (≥ 0.2 mm) | 20.8 | 18.1 | 14.2 | 10.2 | 10.8 | 11.4 | 10.4 | 13.9 | 12.8 | 17.2 | 20.7 | 20.3 | 180.9 |
| Average snowy days | 1.0 | 1.0 | 1.0 | 0.6 | 0.0 | 0.0 | 0.0 | 0.0 | 0.0 | 0.0 | 0.0 | 1.0 | 4.6 |
| Mean monthly sunshine hours | 61.0 | 85.6 | 127.6 | 194.7 | 234.5 | 246.6 | 250.7 | 230.1 | 180.1 | 117.1 | 77.8 | 58.2 | 1,864 |
| Percentage possible sunshine | 22.7 | 29.1 | 34.7 | 47.7 | 49.6 | 51.2 | 51.7 | 52.0 | 47.8 | 35.3 | 28.7 | 22.8 | 41.8 |
Source 1: Guernsey Met Office 2018 Weather Report
Source 2: Weather-online.co.uk

== Subdivisions ==
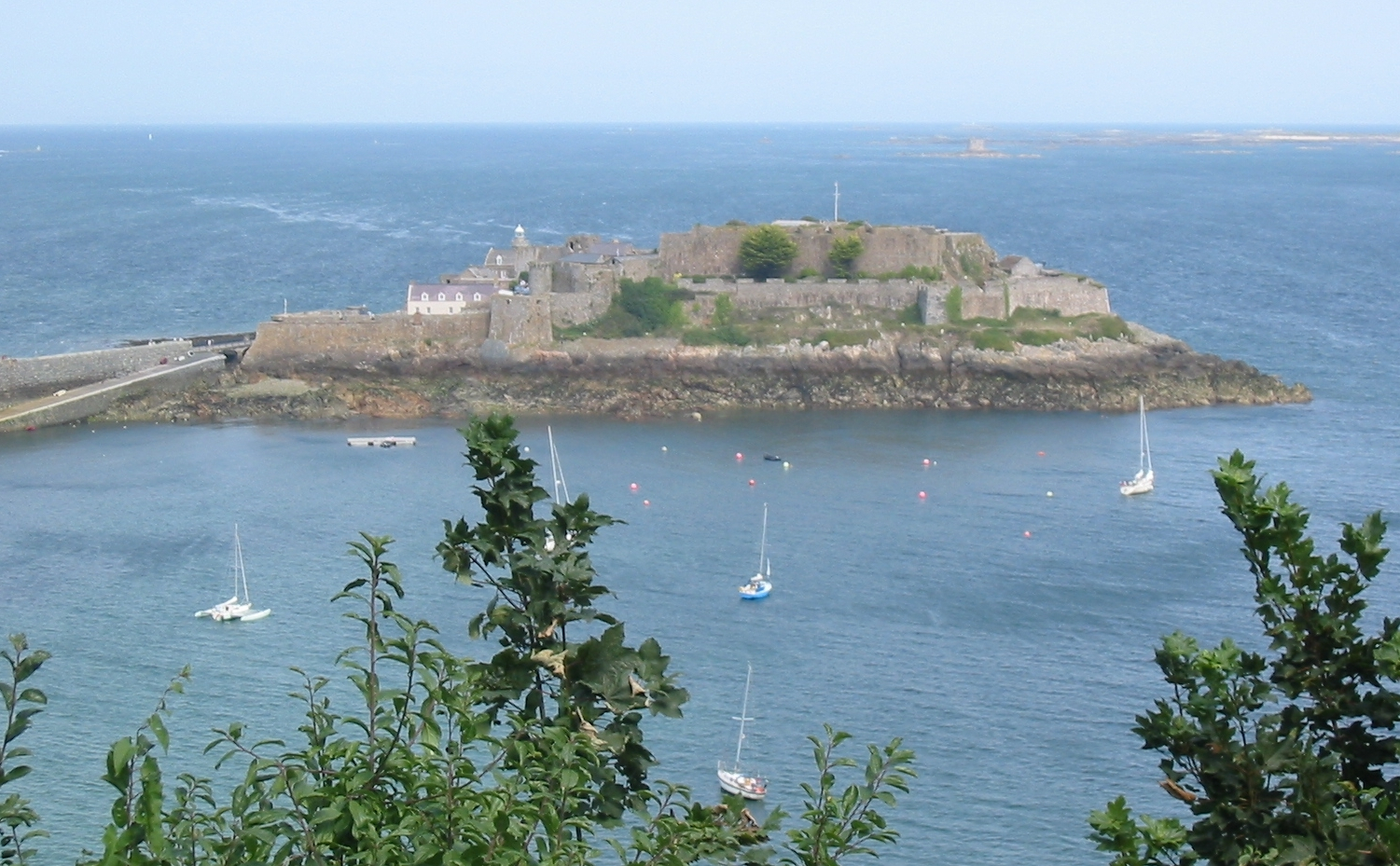
Castle Cornet

Saint Peter Port is subdivided into four cantons:

1. Canton 1 or North Canton
2. Canton 2 or Canton of the North-West
3. Canton 3 or Canton of the South-West
4. Canton 4 or Canton of the South

In addition, the islands of Herm and Jethou belong to the parish, but are not part of any canton. They belong to Electoral district Saint Peter Port South.

== Sport and leisure ==
St. Peter Port has an English Isthmian League club, Guernsey F.C. who play at Victoria Park. The Guernsey Rugby Football Club also play at Footes Lane and compete in National League 3 London & SE.

== Media ==
St. Peter Port is covered by the local television news programmes: BBC Channel Islands News and ITV News Channel TV. Guernsey's two main radio stations: BBC Radio Guernsey and Island FM are based in the town. The local newspaper is the Guernsey Press.

== Features ==
The features of the town include:

- St Peter Port Harbour
- Town Church, Guernsey, the parish church of St Peter Port at the heart of the town
- Buildings
  - The Royal Court House (La Cohue Royale), seat of the States of Guernsey
  - Hauteville House, Victor Hugo's house of exile, which is now a museum under the aegis of the city of Paris.
  - National Trust of Guernsey Victorian shop
  - Elizabeth College founded in 1563 by Elizabeth I of England. The main building (built 1826) is a prominent feature of the skyline.
  - Victoria Tower
  - Priaulx Library
  - Guille-Allès Library
  - St James concert hall
  - Our Lady of the Rosary Church
- The Market, the Arcade, the High Street, the Pollet, Smith Street, Mill Street and Mansel Street, which are all pedestrian priority and part of the shopping district
- Cobbled streets and narrow passageways of the old town
- Guernsey Museum at Candie (Candie Museum)
- Candie Gardens
- Marinas for visiting and local boats
- Military:
  - Castle Cornet, the historic fortress that guarded the strategic entrance to the port. The castle was formerly a tidal island, but since 1859 a breakwater has connected it to the enlarged harbour.
  - German Naval Signals HQ, the headquarters of the German Naval Commander Channel Islands, which was established next to La Collinette Hotel, and was responsible for all radio traffic to and from Germany and the other Islands. The last operational Signals HQ that was running up until 9 May 1945, using the Enigma code machines that were being decoded by the staff at Bletchley Park.
  - Island war memorial at the top of Smith Street
  - Parish war memorial at the bottom of Smith Street
  - St Stephens war memorial in St Stephens church
  - Liberation monument
  - Anglo-Boer War memorial, in the Avenue
  - Fort George
  - Cemetery at Fort George
  - Commonwealth War Graves at Le Foulon cemetery
  - Clarence Battery dating from the Napoleonic Wars
  - La Vallette Underground Military Museum
  - German fortifications, built during the occupation 1940–45
  - Two 13.5 cm K 09 German World War I Canon near Victoria Tower
- The Guernsey Aquarium, situated in fortified tunnels at La Vallette, built during the German occupation. Scheduled to close down permanently next month (October 2019) due to lack of income and funds. As of December 2021, it is now closed.
- Bathing places at La Vallette
- A number of protected buildings
  - Castle Carey was built in 1840 for John Carey. It is a Gothic Revival property, attributed to the architect John Wilson, who designed Elizabeth College and St James Concert Hall. It was briefly the residence of the Lieutenant Governor of the Bailiwick of Guernsey and hosted Queen Victoria and Prince Albert during their visit to Guernsey in 1859, and the Duke of Cambridge in 1862. Victor Hugo’s novel Les Travailleurs de la Mer, published in 1866 and dedicated to Guernsey, where he spent 15 years in exile, mentions Castle Carey. The castle stayed in the Carey family until William Wilfred Carey sold it in 1912. During the Second World War, the Germans occupying Guernsey used Castle Carey as an officers’ club.

The parish of Saint Peter Port hosts:

- Government House (office of the Lieutenant Governor of Guernsey
- St Peter Port Douzaine
- Guernsey Information Centre
- Fire Station
- States of Guernsey Police Service
- Guernsey Ambulance and Rescue Service
- Saint Peter Port Lifeboat Station
- Guernsey Border Agency
- Guernsey Post
- Footes Lane
- Ladies' College
- Vauvert Primary School
- Many shops
- Number of banks
- Large number of offices
- The International Stock Exchange
- Condor Ferries, a car ferry company which operates to Jersey, France and the UK, has its head office in Saint Peter Port.
- Countryside walks
- Val des Terres Hill Climb
- St Peter Port Harbour Carnival
- Town Carnival

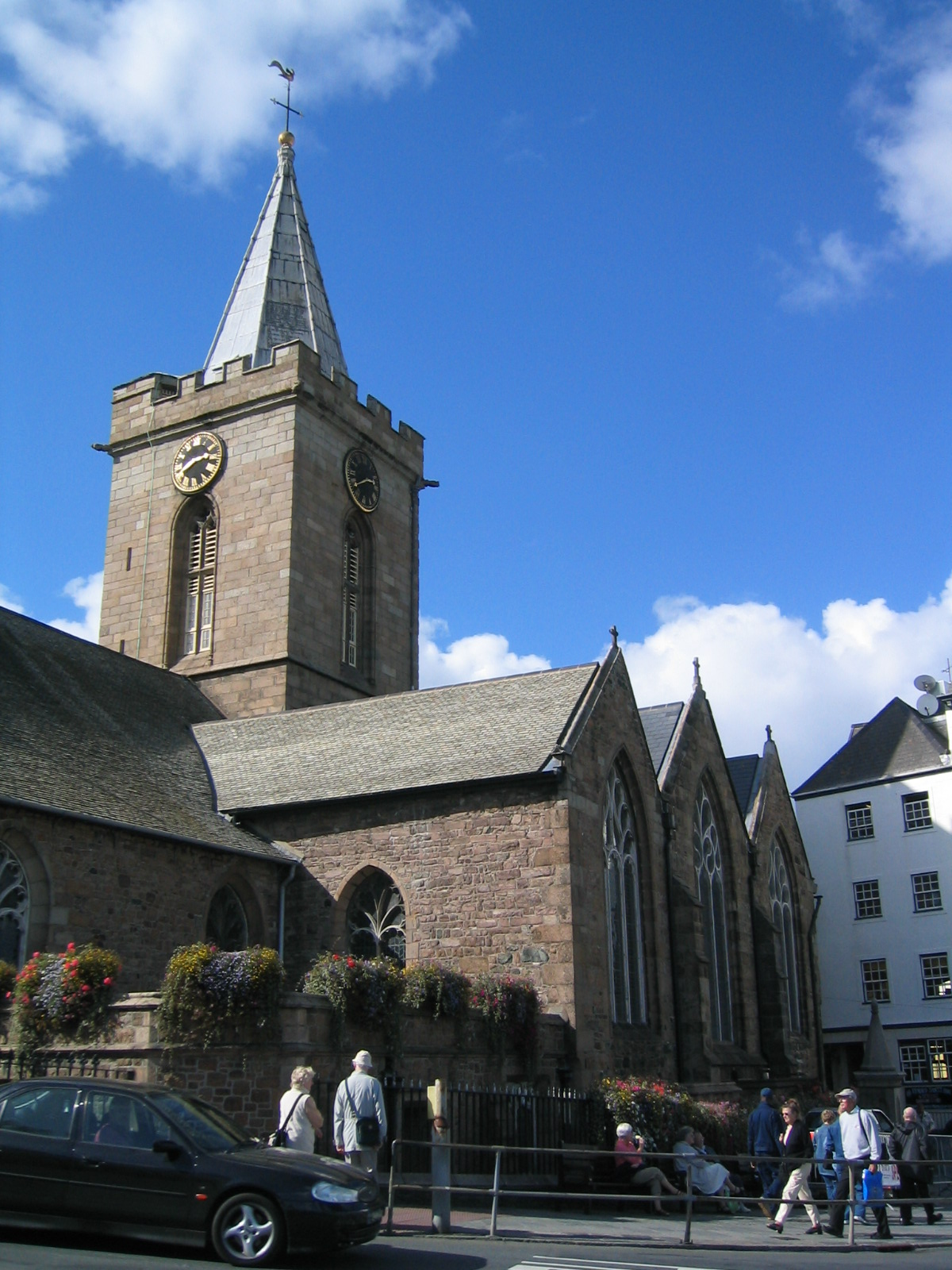
The Town Church

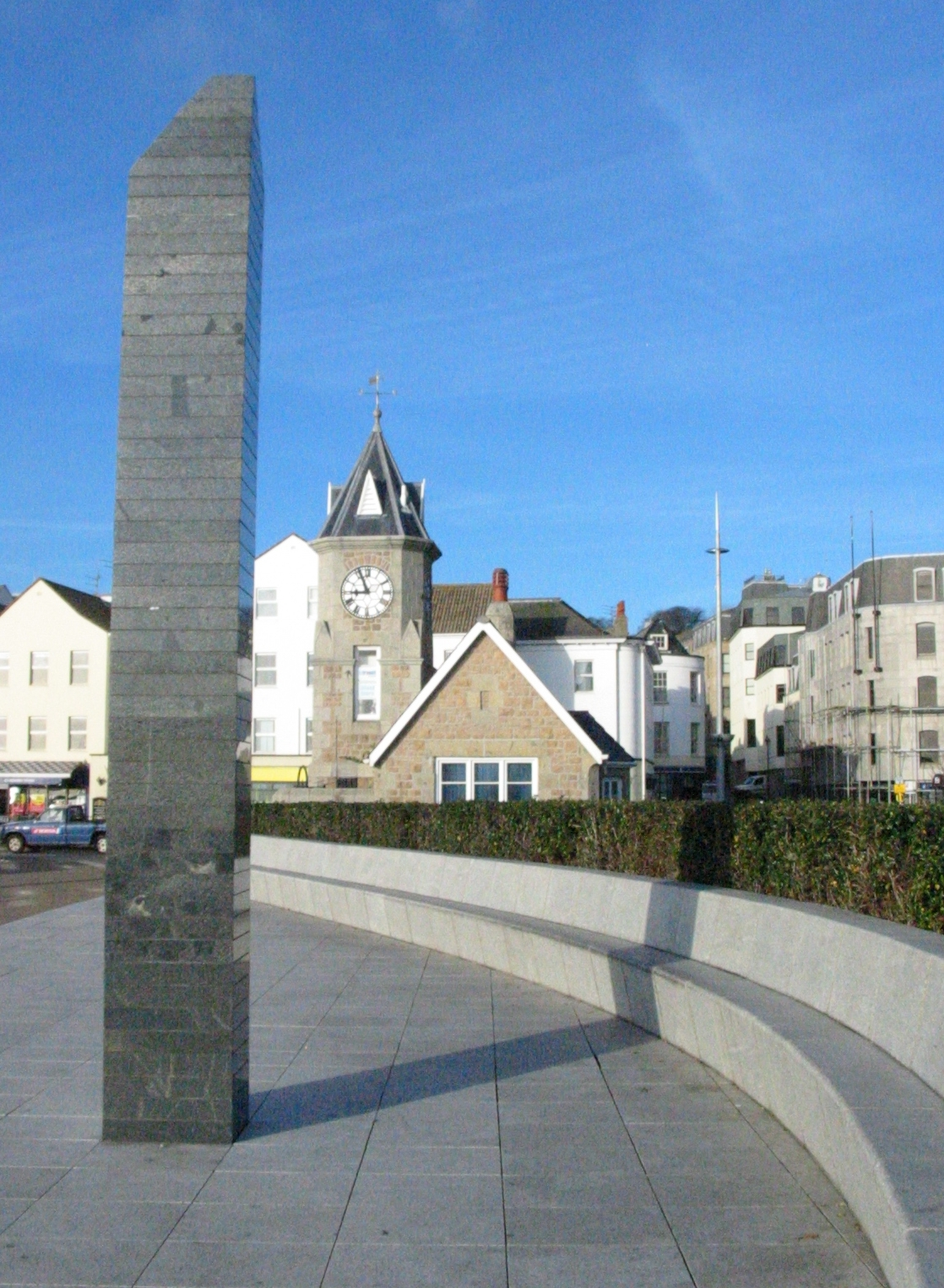
Liberation Monument

=== Numismatic depictions ===
Guernsey bank notes feature a number of parish buildings:

- One pound, the Market and the Royal Court
- One pound commemorative, the Market and Fountain Street
- Five pound, the Town Church

- Ten pound, Elizabeth College
- Twenty pound, St James concert hall
- Fifty pound, Royal Court house

== Transport ==
The following main roads (listed from north-south) provide important links between St Peter Port and the other parishes:

- Les Banques (leads up the coast to St Sampson's and the north of the island)
- Rohais (leads to the parish of Castel)
- Mount Row (leads to St Andrew's and the west of the island)
- Ruette Brayes (leads to St Martin's and the south of the island)
- Fort Road (leads to St Martin's)

The following coastal roads (listed from north to south) are also very important as they provide access to the shops, carparks and the harbour:

- St George's Esplanade
- North Esplanade
- South Esplanade

The principal bus station is located in the parish on South Esplanade. Town Terminus is the terminus for the island's public transport network, where all bus routes on the island terminate.

The parish contains Saint Peter Port Harbour, the island's main port. All ferry services across the rest of the Bailiwick, Jersey, Poole and Portsmouth can be found here, as well as summer-seasonal cruise ships.

== Politics ==
Saint Peter Port comprised two administrative division, St Peter Port South and St Peter Port North, until the 2018 referendum implemented a single constituency.

In the 2016 Guernsey general election in:

- St Peter Port South, there was a 2,068 or 63% turnout to elect five deputies.
- St Peter Port North, there was a 2,639 or 65% turnout to elect six deputies.

== Notable people ==
- Margaret Ann Neve, supercentenarian
- Sir Isaac Brock, major general in the British Army
- Matt Le Tissier, footballer
- Linda Martel, healer (1956-1961)
- Alison Merrien, World indoors bowls champion
- George Métivier, poet
- Heather Watson, tennis player, Team GB athlete and Wimbledon Champion
- Victor Hugo, French writer, in exile in St Peter Port from 1855 to 1870
- Cameron Chalmers, athlete

== See also ==
- Maritime history of the Channel Islands
