= Victoria Tower, Guernsey =

Coordinates: 49.4581°N 2.5428°W

Victoria Tower
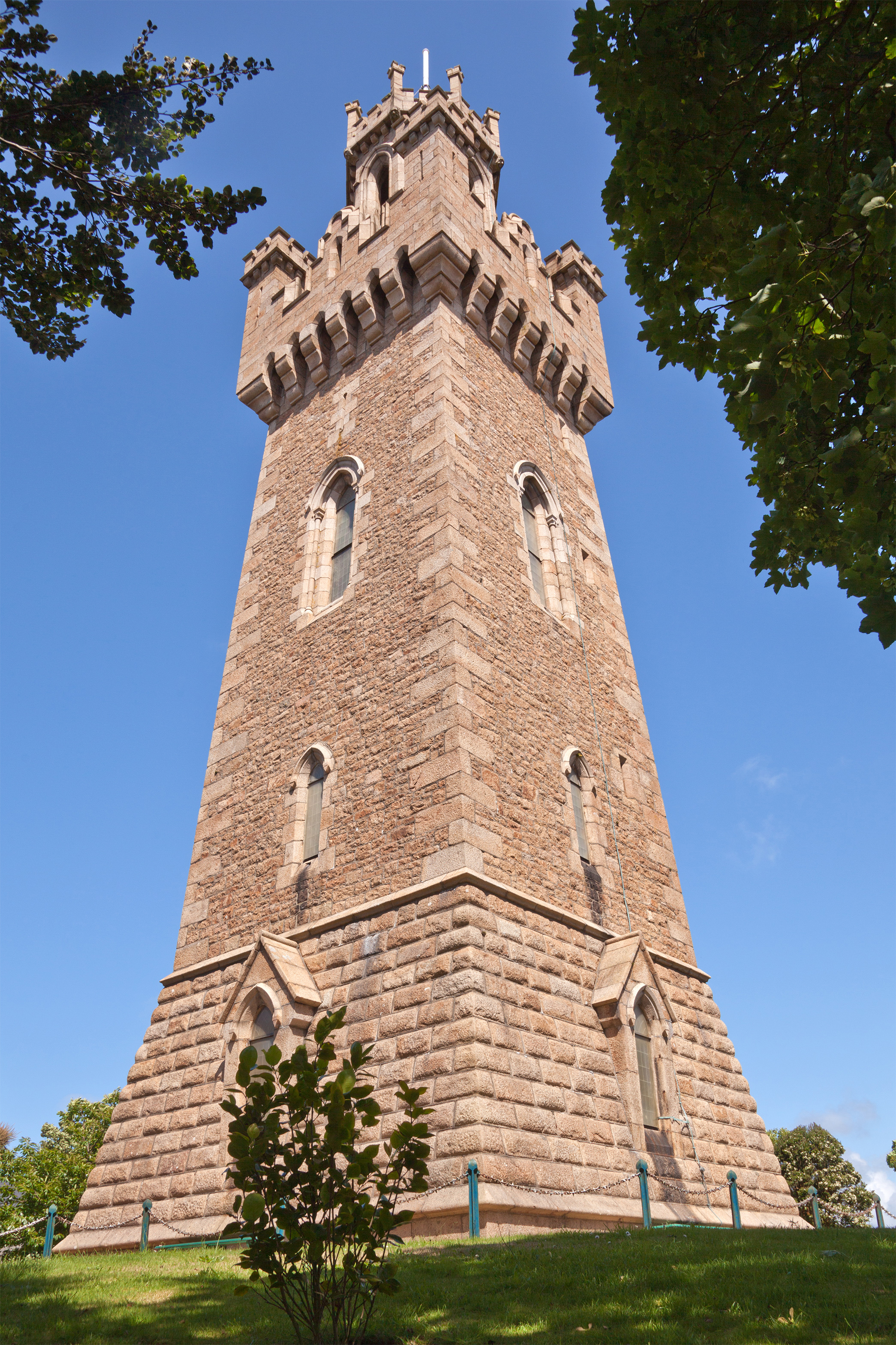
- Victoria Tower in Guernsey
- Interactive map of the Victoria Tower area

General information
- Type: Tower
- Location: St Peter Port, Guernsey, Channel Islands
- Construction started: 1848
- Cost: £2000 (in 1846)

Design and construction
- Architect: William Colling

Victoria Tower is a monument in Saint Peter Port, Guernsey, erected in honor of a visit by Queen Victoria and Prince Albert to the island in 1846.

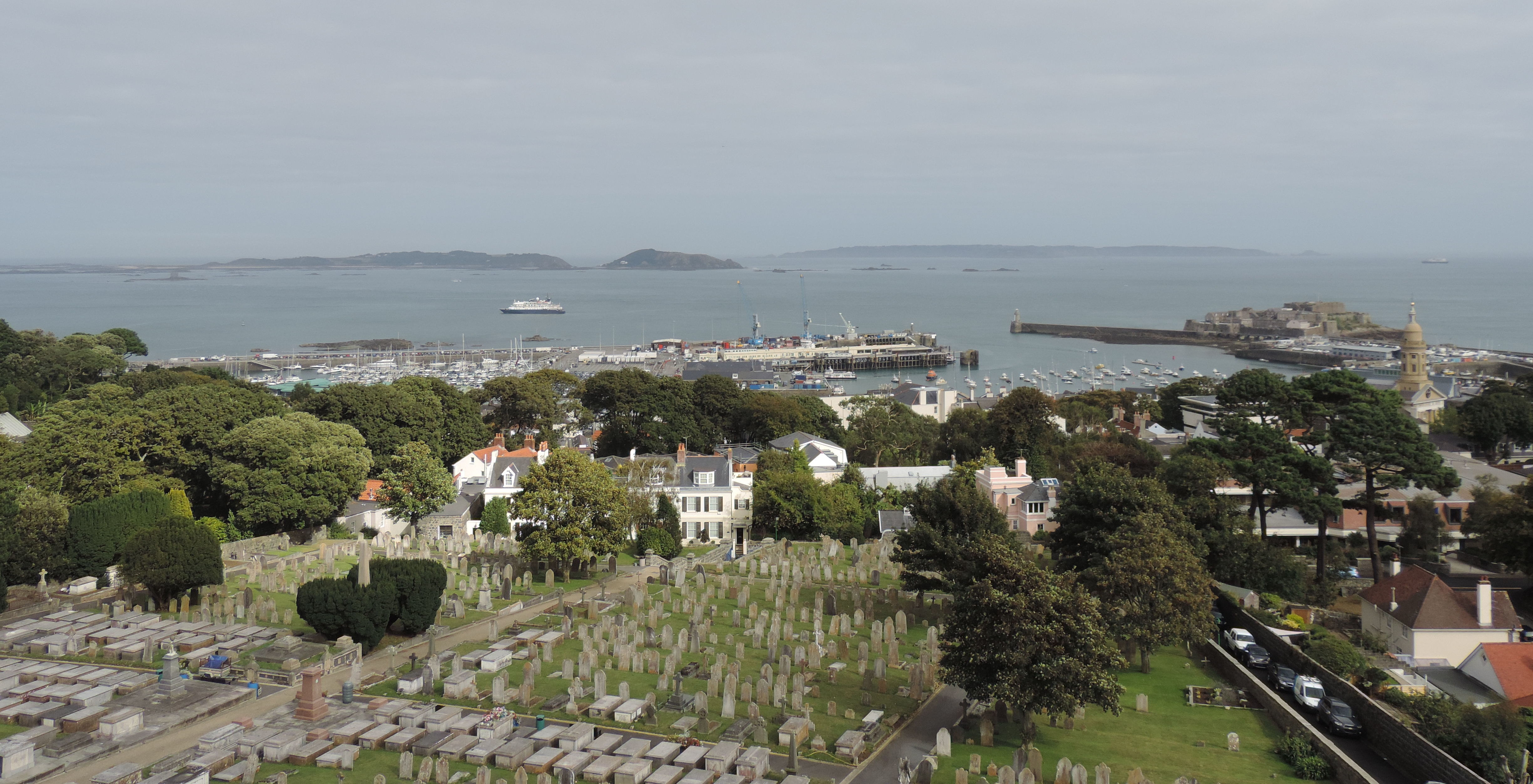
View of Saint Peter Port from Victoria Tower

== History ==
As the 1846 royal visit was the first time a reigning monarch had ever visited the island, a small granite stone was laid to mark where the queen had first stepped ashore in St Peter Port harbour. The following year, the architect William Colling was asked to draw up plans for a tower to commemorate the monarch's visit.

The site chosen for Victoria Tower was an earthen mound opposite the Arsenal, where Guernsey's militia were housed. On 27 May 1848 the first foundation stone was laid by the Governor of Guernsey, Major General John Bell, during a large ceremony. In the foundations of the tower was a time capsule containing Guernsey and English coins.

On 14 August 1859 Queen Victoria and Prince Albert visited the island again and after an island tour came to inspect the tower.

In 1999 structural problems led to the tower's being closed to the general public; it was re-opened on 24 May 2006, the birthday of Queen Victoria, during a re-enactment of the ceremony accompanying the laying of the foundation stone in 1848. The Lieutenant Governor, Vice Admiral Sir Fabian Malbon KBE, re-opened the tower in the presence of the Bailiff Geoffrey Rowland.

== Surrounding area ==
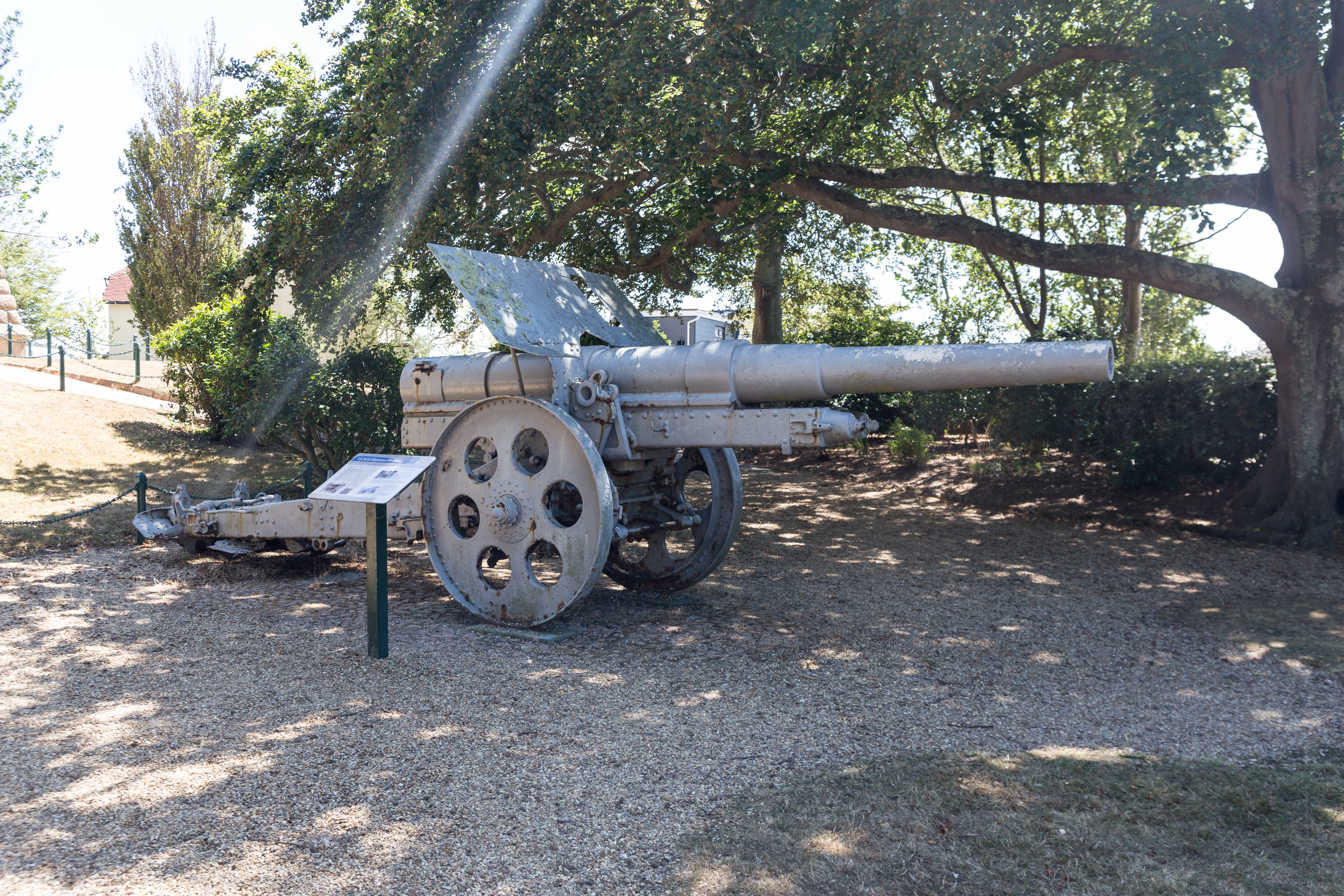
One of the two German 13.5 cm howitzers.

The tower is next to the Town Arsenal, originally built to house the artillery for the Royal Guernsey Militia, currently used by the Guernsey Fire and Rescue Service

A public garden around the tower was later created, in which were placed two cannons captured from the Russians during the Crimean War these now sit on the ramparts of Castle Cornet. Years later, other guns were displayed in the garden, including four 13.5 cm K 09 German guns, two of these were scrapped in 1938, with the remaining two buried as the Second World War approached in 1940, so that the invading German forces would think the island was not fortified. The two German guns that were buried were excavated in 1978 and are back on display in the garden.
