= 10 cm K 04 =

10 cm Kanone 04
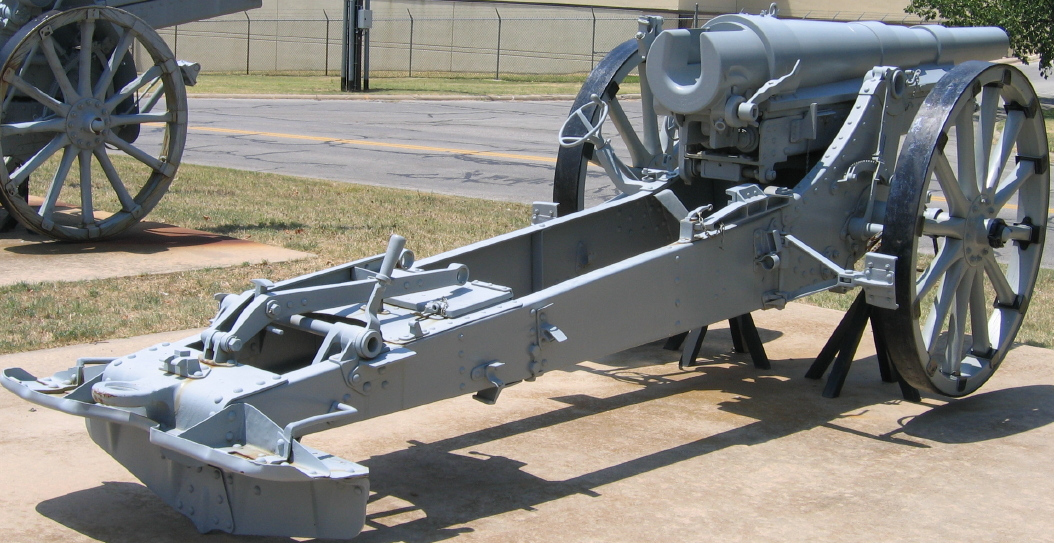
- A K 04 at the U.S. Army Field Artillery Museum, Ft. Sill, Oklahoma
- Type: Field gun
- Place of origin: German Empire

Service history
- In service: 1905–1918
- Used by: German Empire
- Wars: World War I

Production history
- Designer: Krupp
- Designed: 1904
- Manufacturer: Krupp
- Produced: 1905-?
- Variants: 10 cm K 04/12

Specifications
- Mass: 2,428 kg (5,353 lb)
- Barrel length: 4.725 m (15.5 ft) (L/35)
- Shell: Fixed QF
- Shell weight: 18.5 kg (41 lb)
- Caliber: 105 mm (4.13 in)
- Breech: vertical sliding-wedge
- Recoil: Hydro-spring variable recoil
- Carriage: Box trail
- Elevation: −5° to +30°
- Traverse: 3° 59'
- Rate of fire: 1 round per 2 minutes
- Muzzle velocity: 551 m/s (1,808 ft/s)
- Effective firing range: 10,398 m (11,264 yards)

The 10 cm Kanone 04 (10 cm K 04) was a field gun used by Germany in World War I. It was the second heavy gun with modern recoil system accepted by the German Army. It was produced as a replacement for the 10 cm K 99 and the lange 15 cm Kanone 92. Although the standard version lacked a gunshield, some models, such as the 10 cm K 04/12, were fitted with a special gunshield and some other minor modifications. Only 32 were in service at the outbreak of the war.

It could be transported in one load by a team of six horses, or it could be broken down into two loads (tandem hitches) for crossing rough terrain.
