= German occupation of the Channel Islands =

Part of World War II

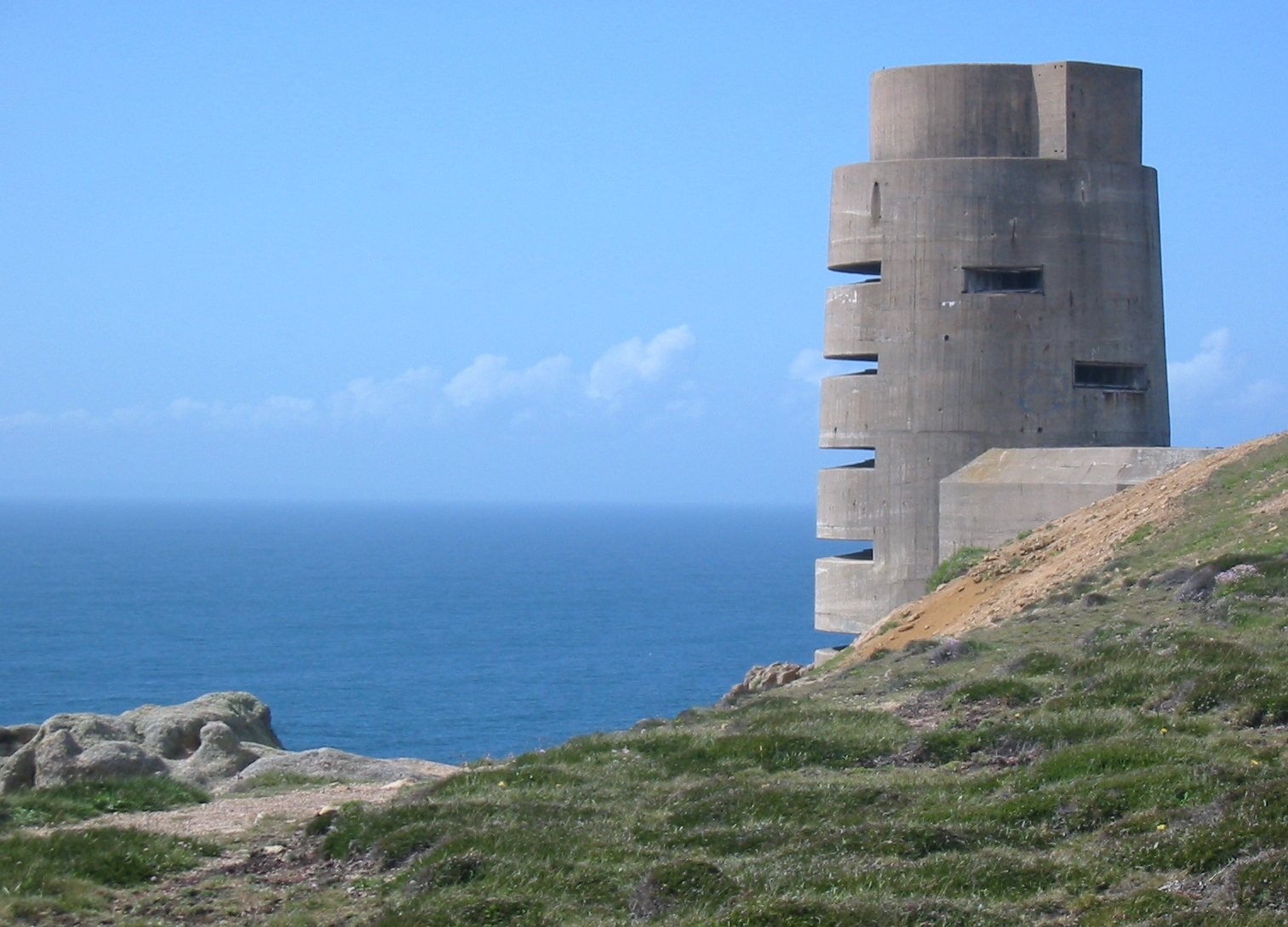
As part of the Atlantic Wall, between 1940 and 1945 the occupying German forces and the Organisation Todt constructed fortifications around the coasts of the Channel Islands such as this observation tower at Battery Moltke.

The military occupation of the Channel Islands by Nazi Germany lasted for most of the Second World War, from 30 June 1940 until liberation on 9 May 1945. The Bailiwick of Jersey and Bailiwick of Guernsey are British Crown dependencies in the English Channel, near the coast of Normandy. The Channel Islands were the only de jure part of the British Empire in Europe to be occupied by Nazi Germany during the war. Germany's allies Italy and Japan also occupied British territories in Africa and Asia, respectively.

Anticipating a swift victory over Britain, the occupying German forces initially experimented by using a moderate approach to the non-Jewish population, supported by local collaborators. However, the situation grew gradually worse and ended in near-starvation for both occupiers and occupied in the winter of 1944–45. Armed resistance by islanders to the German occupation was nearly non-existent, though there were a number of British forces raids on the islands. Many islanders were employed by the Germans, and Germany imported thousands of forced labourers to build extensive defensive works, such as the war tunnels on the island which spent most of the war acting as a hospital. Island leaders maintained some authority, independence and autonomy from the German occupiers.

== Before occupation ==
=== Early months of the Second World War ===
Between 3 September 1939, when the United Kingdom declared war on Germany, and 9 May 1940, little changed in the Channel Islands. Unlike in the UK, conscription did not exist, but a number of people travelled to Britain to join up as volunteers. The horticulture and tourist trades continued as before; the British government relaxed travel restrictions between the UK and the Channel Islands in March 1940, allowing tourists from the UK to take morale-boosting holidays in the traditional island resorts. On 10 May 1940, Germany attacked the Netherlands, Belgium, and Luxembourg by air and land, bringing the war closer. The Battle of France was reaching its climax on Empire Day, 24 May, when King George VI addressed his subjects by radio, saying, "The decisive struggle is now upon us ... Let no one be mistaken; it is not mere territorial conquest that our enemies are seeking. It is the overthrow, complete and final, of this Empire and of everything for which it stands, and after that the conquest of the world. And if their will prevails they will bring to its accomplishment all the hatred and cruelty which they have already displayed."

On 11 June 1940, as part of the British war effort in the Battle of France, a long-range Royal Air Force aerial sortie carried out by 36 Whitley bombers against the Italian cities of Turin and Genoa departed from airfields in Jersey and Guernsey, as part of Operation Haddock. Weather conditions resulted in only ten Whitleys reaching their intended targets. Two bombers were lost in action.

=== Demilitarisation ===
On 15 June, after the Allied defeat in the Battle of France, the British government decided that the Channel Islands were of no strategic importance and would not be defended, but did not tell Germany. Despite the reluctance of Prime Minister Winston Churchill, the British government gave up the oldest possession of the Crown "without firing a single shot." The Channel Islands served no purpose for the Germans other than the propaganda value of occupying British territory. The "Channel Islands had been demilitarised and declared ... 'an open town'".

On 16 June 1940, the Lieutenant-Governors of each island were instructed to make as many boats as possible available to help evacuate British soldiers from Saint-Malo. Guernsey was too far away to help at such short notice. The Bailiff of Jersey called on the Saint Helier Yacht Club for help. Four yachts set off immediately, and fourteen others were ready within 24 hours. The first yachts arrived in Saint-Malo on the morning of 17 June and embarked troops from shore to waiting transport ships; the remaining yachts from Jersey arrived on 18 June and helped clear the last parties from land.

On 17 June 1940, a plane arrived in Jersey from Bordeaux, evacuating Brigade General Charles de Gaulle. After coffee and refuelling, the plane flew on to Heston, outside London, where the next day the general made his historic appeal of 18 June to the French people on the BBC. The last troops left the islands on 20 June, departing so quickly that they left behind bedding and half-consumed meals in Castle Cornet. The Hawker Hurricane fighters of the No. 501 Squadron RAF arrived in Jersey from Dinard in France on 17 June and evacuated to England on 21 June.

=== Evacuation ===
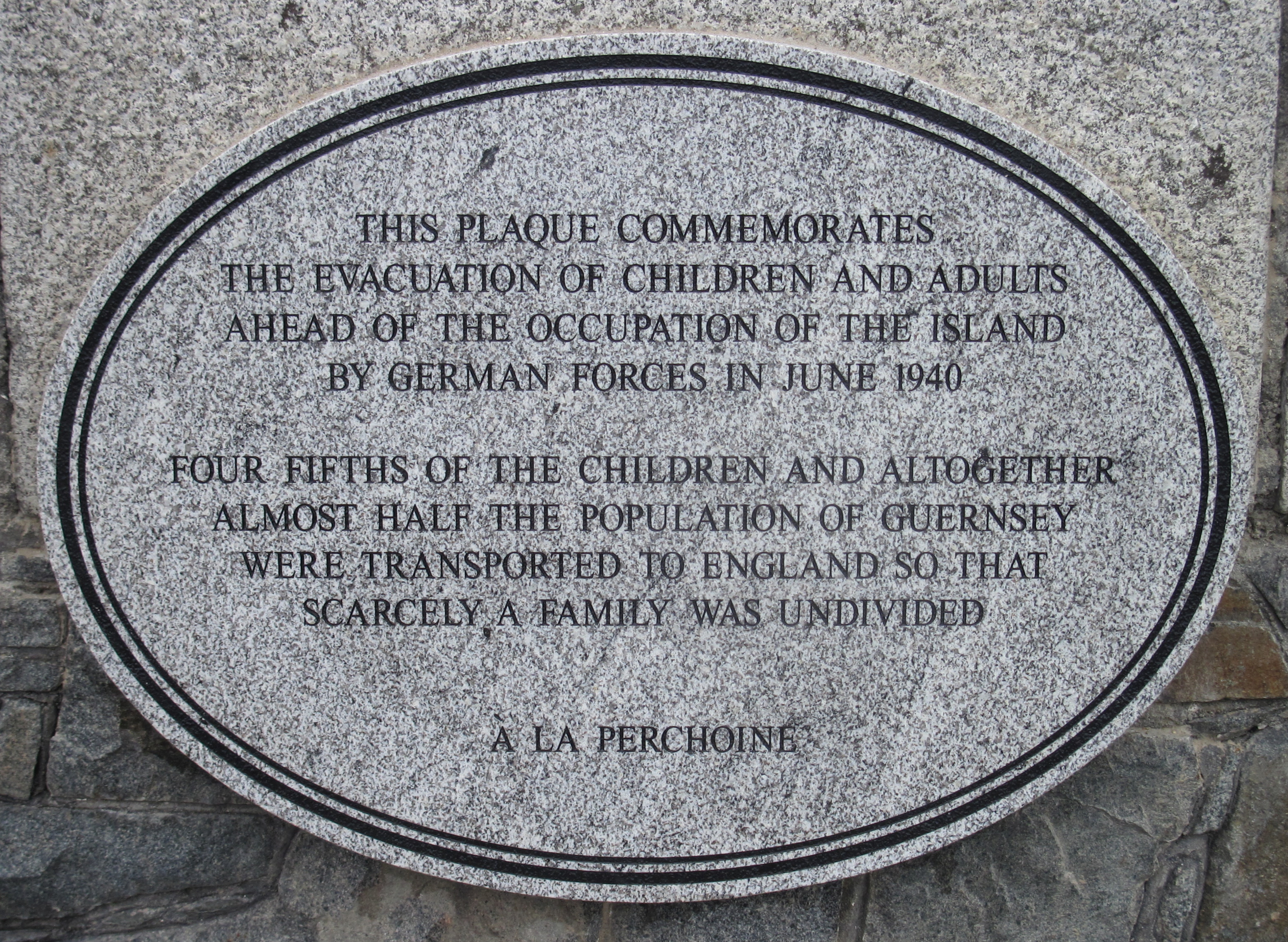
Memorial in Saint Peter Port: "This plaque commemorates the evacuation of children and adults ahead of the occupation of the island by German forces in June 1940. Four-fifths of the children and altogether almost half the population of Guernsey were transported to England so that scarcely a family was undivided. À la perchoine."

The realisation of the necessity of civilian evacuation from the Channel Islands came very late. With no planning, and with secrecy maintained, communications between the same island governments and the UK took place amid confusion and misinterpretation. Opinion was divided and chaos ensued as the islands adopted differing policies. The British government decided to make as many ships as possible available so that islanders who wanted to leave had the option.

Authorities in Alderney had no direct communication with the UK and recommended that all islanders evacuate. All but a handful did so. The Dame of Sark Sibyl Hathaway encouraged everyone to stay. Guernsey evacuated 80% of school-age children, giving the parents the option to either keep their children with them, or evacuate them with their school. By 21 June it became apparent to the government of Guernsey that it would be impossible to evacuate everyone who wanted to leave and priority would have to be given to special categories for the time remaining. The messaging in Guernsey became anti-evacuation; in total 5,000 schoolchildren and 12,000 adults out of a population of 42,000 were evacuated. In Jersey, where children were on holiday to help with the potato crop, 23,000 civilians registered to leave, but the majority of the islanders, following the consistent advice of the island government, chose to stay, with only 6,600 of 50,000 leaving. Nearby Cherbourg was already occupied by German forces before official evacuation boats started leaving on 20 June; the last official one left on 23 June, although mail boats and cargo ships continued to call at the islands until 28 June.

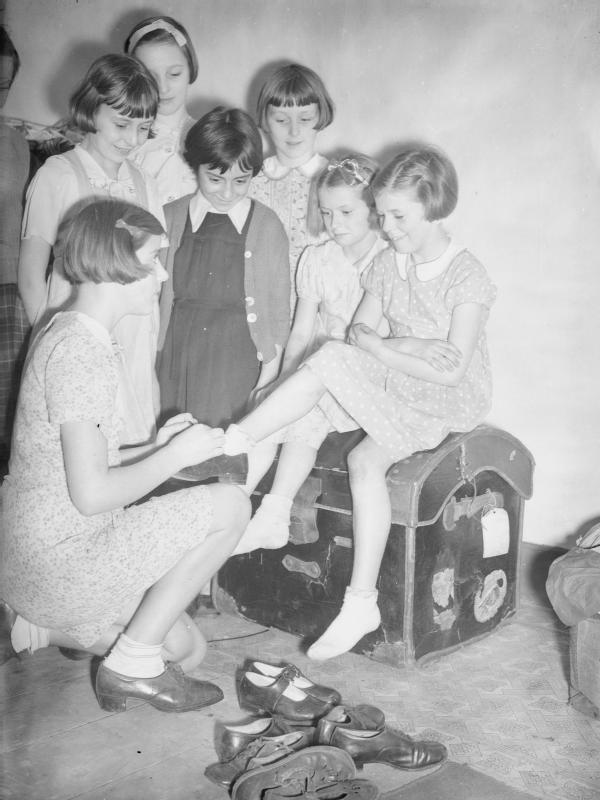
1940: A group of girls evacuated from the Channel Islands to Marple, on mainland Britain, try on clothes and shoes donated by the United States.

Most evacuated children were separated from their parents. Some were assisted financially by the "Foster Parent Plan for Children Affected by War", under which each child was sponsored by a wealthy American. First Lady Eleanor Roosevelt sponsored a girl named Paulette.

=== Emergency government ===
The Home Office instructed the lieutenant governors that in the event of the recall of the representatives of the Crown, the bailiffs should take over their responsibilities and that the bailiffs and Crown Officers should remain at their posts. The Lieutenant Governor of Jersey discussed with the Bailiff of Jersey a requirement to carry on administration under German orders. The bailiff felt this was contrary to his oath of allegiance, but was instructed otherwise.

Last-minute arrangements were made to enable British administration to legally continue under occupation. The withdrawal of the lieutenant governors on 21 June 1940 and the cutting of contact with the Privy Council prevented royal assent to laws passed by the legislatures. The bailiffs took over the civil, but not the military, functions of the lieutenant governors. The traditional consensus-based governments of the bailiwicks were unsuited to swift executive action, and therefore faced by imminent occupation, adopted smaller instruments of government. The legislatures met in public; smaller executive bodies that could meet behind closed doors enabled freer discussion of matters such as the extent of compliance with German orders.

In Guernsey, the States of Deliberation voted on 21 June 1940 to hand responsibility for island affairs to a controlling committee, under Attorney-General Ambrose Sherwill MC, age 50, chosen because he was younger and more robust than the 69-year-old Bailiff, Victor Carey. The States of Jersey passed the Defence (Transfer of Powers) (Jersey) Regulation 1940 on 27 June 1940 to amalgamate executive committees into eight departments, each a States member. The presidents and Crown Officers made up the Superior Council under 48-year-old bailiff Capt. Alexander Coutanche.

=== Invasion ===
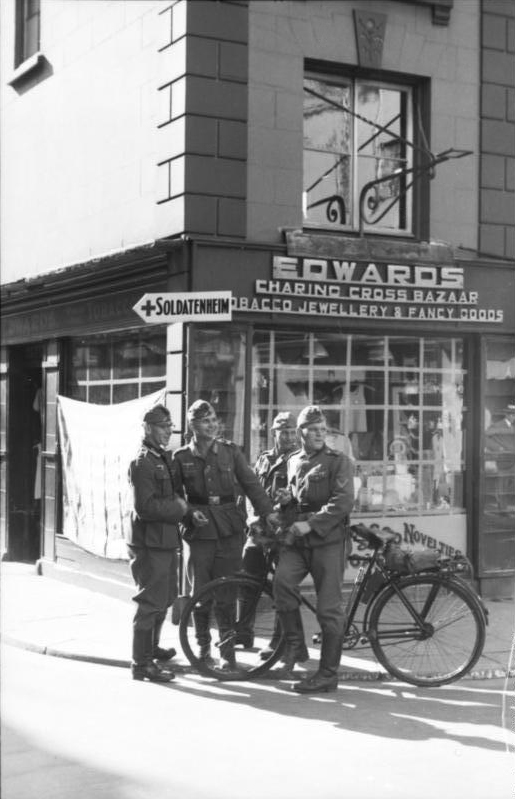
German soldiers in Jersey

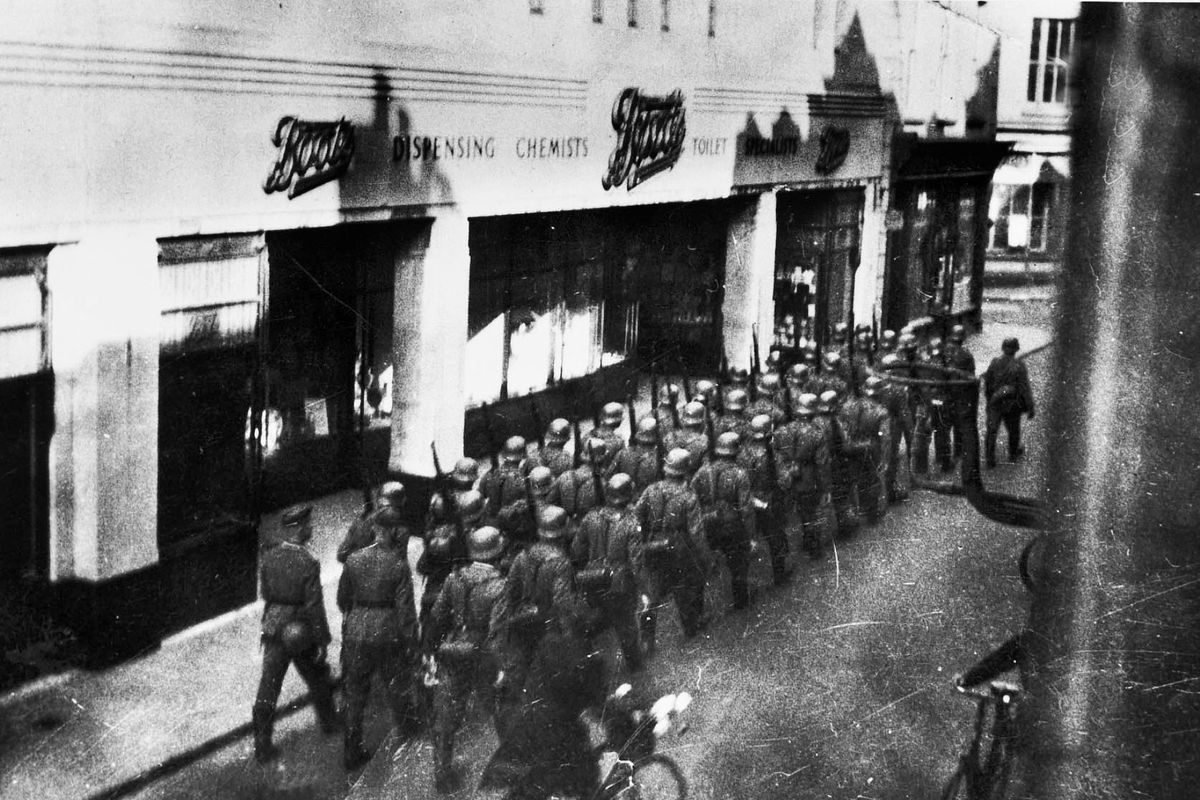
German soldiers marching before a Boots pharmacy in the British Channel Islands, 1940s

The Germans did not realise that the islands had been demilitarised (news of the demilitarisation had been suppressed until 30 June 1940), and they approached them with caution. Reconnaissance flights were inconclusive. On 28 June 1940, they sent a squadron of bombers over the islands and bombed the harbours of Guernsey and Jersey. In St. Peter Port, the main town of Guernsey, some lorries lined up to load tomatoes for export to England were mistaken by the reconnaissance flights for troop carriers. A similar attack occurred in Jersey where nine died. In total, 44 islanders were killed in the raids. The BBC broadcast a belated message that the islands had been declared "open towns" and later in the day reported the German bombing of the island.

While the Wehrmacht was preparing Operation Grünpfeil (Green Arrow), a planned invasion of the islands with assault troops comprising two battalions, a reconnaissance pilot, Hauptmann Liebe-Pieteritz, made a test landing at Guernsey's deserted airfield on 30 June to determine the level of defence. He reported his brief landing to Luftflotte 3 which came to the decision that the islands were not defended. A platoon of Luftwaffe airmen was flown that evening to Guernsey by Junkers transport planes. Inspector Sculpher of the Guernsey police went to the airport carrying a letter signed by the bailiff stating that "This Island has been declared an Open Island by His Majesty's Government of the United Kingdom. There are no armed forces of any description. The bearer has been instructed to hand this communication to you. He does not understand the German language." He found that the airport had been taken over by the Luftwaffe. The senior German officer, Major Albrecht Lanz, asked to be taken to the island's chief man. They went by police car to the Royal Hotel where they were joined by the bailiff, the president of the controlling committee, and other officials. Lanz announced through an interpreter that Guernsey was now under German occupation. In this way the Luftwaffe pre-empted the Wehrmacht's invasion plans. Jersey surrendered on 1 July. Alderney, where only a handful of islanders remained, was occupied on 2 July and a small detachment travelled from Guernsey to Sark, which surrendered on 4 July. The first shipborne German troops consisting of two anti-aircraft units, arrived in St. Peter Port on the captured freighter SS Holland on 14 July.

== Occupation ==
The German forces quickly consolidated their positions. They brought in infantry, established communications and anti-aircraft defences, established an air service with occupied mainland France, and rounded up British servicemen on leave.

=== Administration ===
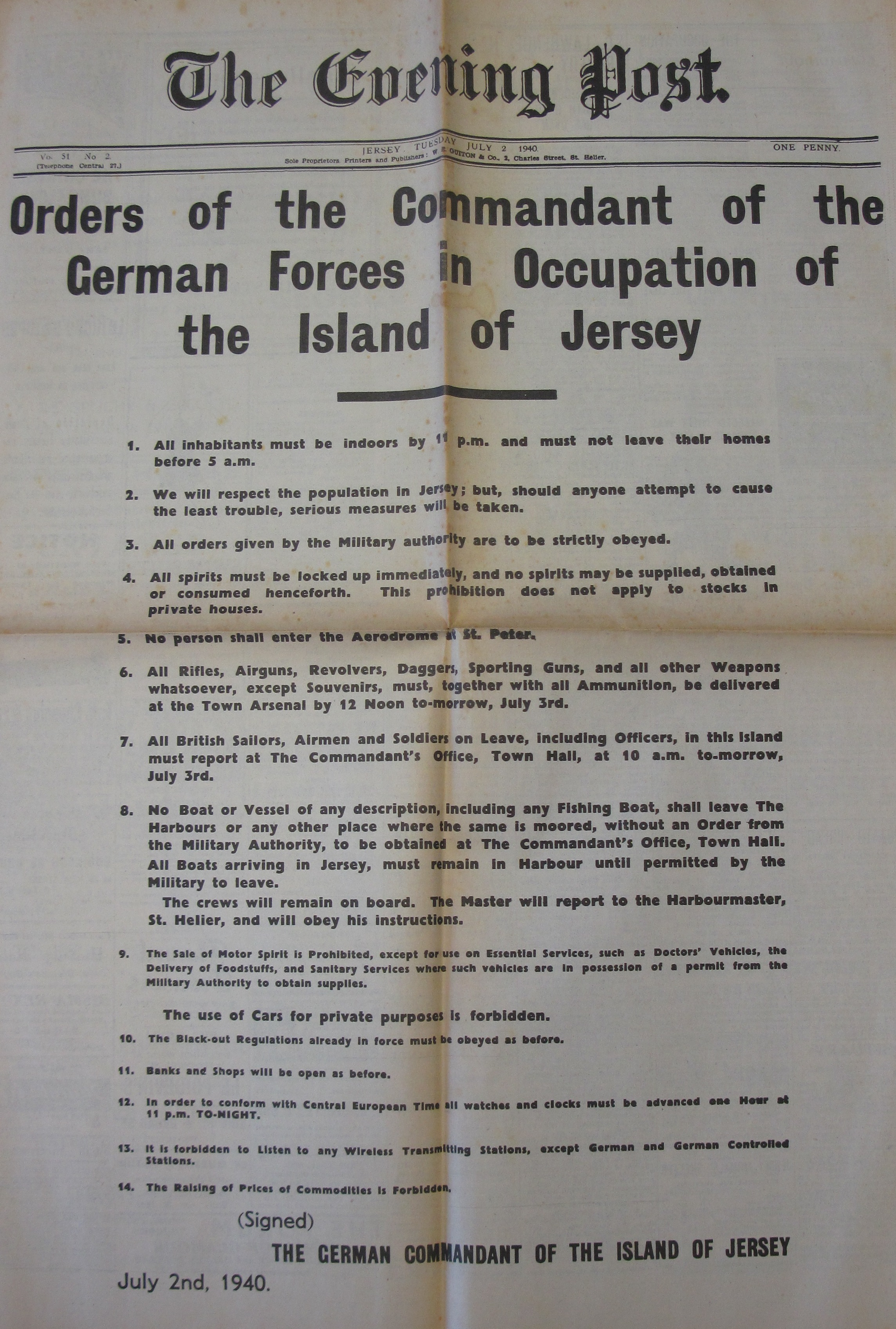
Orders of the Commandant of the German Forces in Occupation of the Island of Jersey, 2 July 1940

The Germans organised their administration as part of the department of Manche, where it was de facto incorporated into Vichy France but administered as part of military government Area A based in St. Germain in the occupied part of France. Feldkommandantur 515 headed by Colonel Friedrich Schumacher arrived on 9 August 1940 in Jersey to establish a civil affairs command structure, with a Nebenstelle in Guernsey (also covering Sark), an Aussenstelle in Alderney, and a logistics Zufuhrstelle in Granville.

The kommandant issued an order in Guernsey on 2 July 1940 and in Jersey on 8 July 1940 instructing that laws passed by the legislatures would have to be given assent by the kommandant and that German orders were to be registered as legislation. The civil courts would continue in operation, but German military courts would try breaches of German law. At first the bailiffs submitted legislation for the assent of the kommandant signed in their capacities as lieutenant governors. At the end of 1941, the kommandant objected to this style and subsequent legislation was submitted simply signed as bailiff.

The German authorities changed the Channel Island time zone from GMT to CET to bring the islands into line with most of continental Europe, and the rule of the road was also changed to driving on the right. Scrip (occupation money) was issued in the islands to keep the economy going. German military forces used the scrip for payment of goods and services. Locals employed by Germans were also paid in the Occupation Reichsmarks.

The Germans allowed entertainment to continue including cinemas and theatre; their military bands performed in public. In 1944, the popular German film actress Lil Dagover arrived to entertain German troops in Jersey and Guernsey with a theatre tour to boost morale.

Besides the civil administration, there was also a military commander (Befehlshaber Kanalinseln, on 1 October 1944 renamed Wehrmachtbefehlshaber Kanalinseln).
Military commanders were:

- Major Albrecht Lanz (1 July 1940 – 26 Sep 1940)
- Colonel Rudolf Graf von Schmettow (26 Sep 1940 – 1 June 1941)
- Generalmajor Erich Müller (1 June 1941 – 1 Sep 1943)
- Generalmajor Rudolf Graf von Schmettow (1 Sep 1943 – 1 Oct 1944)
- Generalleutnant Rudolf Graf von Schmettow (1 Oct 1944 – 26 Feb 1945)
- Vizeadmiral Friedrich Hüffmeier (26 Feb 1945 – 9 May 1945)

The islands were occupied by the 216th Infantry Division until 30 April 1941, and after that by the 319th Infantry Division.

=== Collaboration ===
The view of the majority of islanders about active resistance to German rule was probably expressed by John Lewis, a medical doctor in Jersey. "Any sort of sabotage was not only risky but completely counterproductive. More important still, there would be instant repercussions on the civilian population who were very vulnerable to all sorts of reprisals." Controlling Committee President Sherwill seems to have expressed the views of a majority of the islanders on 18 July 1940 when he complained about a series of abortive raids by British commandos on Guernsey. "Military activities of this kind were most unwelcome and could result in loss of life among the civilian population." He asked the British government to leave the Channel Islands in peace. Sherwill was later imprisoned by the Germans for his role in helping two British spies on Guernsey, and when released, deported to a German internment camp.

Sherwill's situation illustrated the difficulty for the island government and their citizens to cooperate—but to stop short of collaborating—with their occupiers and to retain as much independence as possible from German rule. The issue of islanders' collaboration with the Germans remained quiescent for many years, but was ignited in the 1990s with the release of wartime archives and the subsequent publication of a book titled The Model Occupation: The Channel Islands under German Rule, 1940–1945 by Madeleine Bunting. Language such as the title of one chapter, "Resistance? What Resistance?" incited islander ire. Bunting's point was that the Channel Islanders did not act in a Churchillian manner, they "did not fight on the beaches, in the fields or in the streets. They did not commit suicide, and they did not kill any Germans. Instead they settled down, with few overt signs of resistance, to a hard, dull but relatively peaceful five years of occupation, in which more than half the population was working for the Germans." The issue of collaboration was further inflamed on the Channel Islands by the fictional television programme Island at War (2004), which featured a romance between a German soldier and an island woman and favourably portrayed the German military commander of the occupation.

In the official history of the occupation, author Charles Cruickshank defended the island leaders and their government. Had the island leaders, he said, "simply kept their heads above water and done what they were told to do by the occupying power it would hardly be a matter for censure; but they carried the administrative war into the enemy camp on many occasions. It is not that they made some mistakes that is surprising, but that they did so much right in circumstances of the greatest possibly difficulty."

Norman Le Brocq, a leader of the Jersey resistance and a co-founder of both the Jersey Communist Party and the Jersey Democratic Movement, was bitter towards much of the island's police and government due to their collaboration with the German occupation. He accused both Jersey's police and government of going unpunished despite collaborating with the German occupation by reporting the island's Jews to the Nazis, many of whom were subsequently sent to Auschwitz and Belsen. Whilst his leadership of the resistance went unrecognised by the British government, many officials who had collaborated with the Nazis had been awarded OBE titles and knighthoods.

=== Civilian life during the occupation ===
Life as a civilian during the occupation came as a shock. Having their own governments continuing to govern them softened the blow and kept most civilians at a distance from their oppressors. Many lost their jobs when businesses closed down and it was hard to find work with non-German employers. As the war progressed, life became progressively harsher and morale declined, especially when radios were confiscated and then when deportations took place in September 1942. Food, fuel, and medicines became scarce and crime increased. Following 6 June 1944, liberation became more likely in the popular mind, but the hardest times for civilians were still to come. The winter of 1944–45 was very cold and hungry, many of the population being saved from starvation by the arrival of Red Cross parcels.

=== Restrictions ===
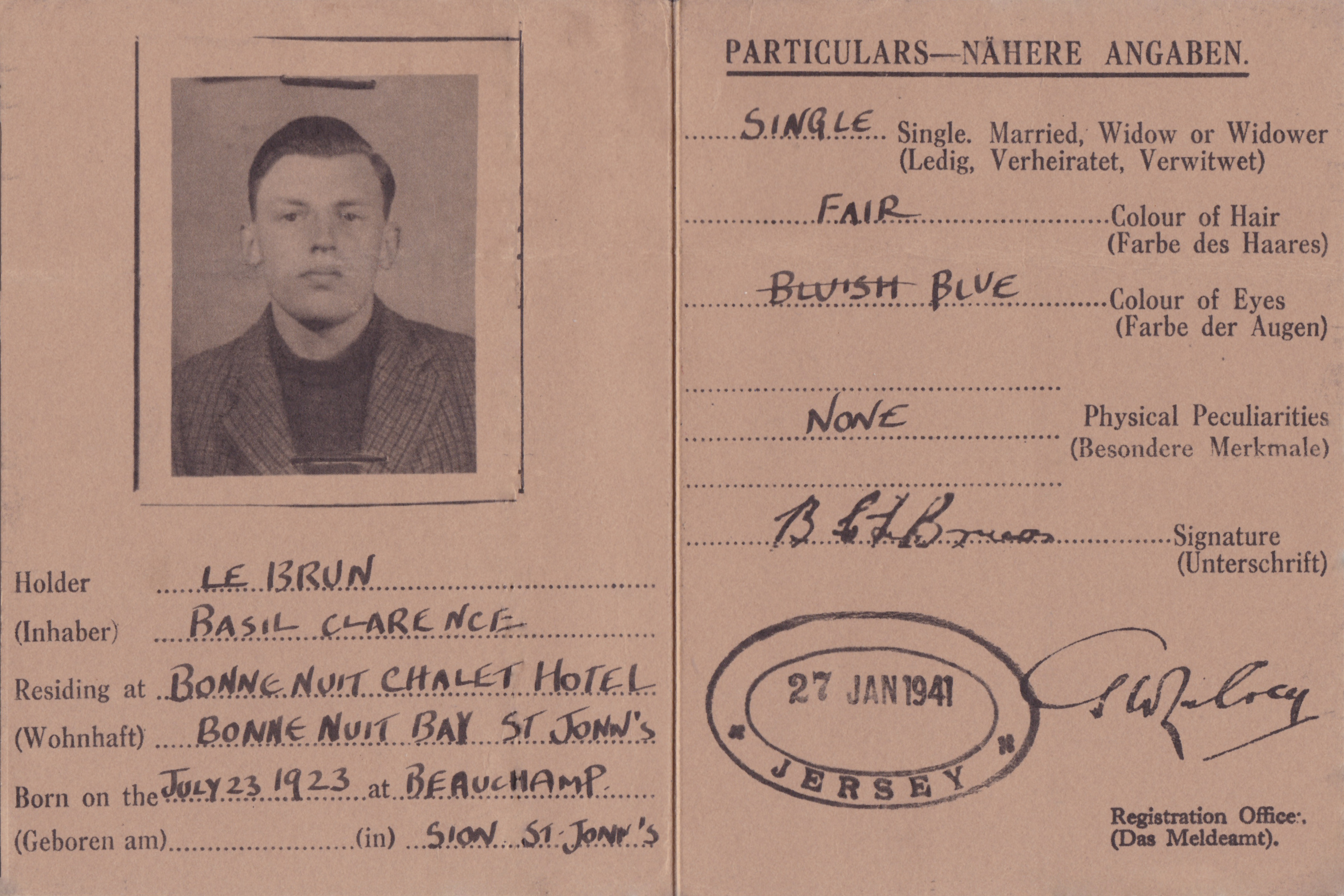
An identity card issued to an islander in January 1941.

On arrival in the islands, the Germans issued proclamations imposing new laws on the resident islanders. As time progressed, additional laws restricting rights were posted and had to be obeyed. The restrictions included:

Confiscation of:

- weapons (1940)
- boats (1940)
- radios (1940) then (1942)
- motor vehicles (forced sale) (1940)
- cameras (1942)
- fuel (1940)
- houses (1940–1945)
- furniture (1940–1945)

Restrictions on:

- fishing (1940)
- drinking spirits (1940)
- exporting goods (1940)
- changing prices of goods (1940)
- patriotic songs and signs (1940)
- more than three people meeting together (1940)
- access to beaches
- fuel
- freedom of speech (1940)
- access to medicines (1940)
- some clubs and associations.

Changes to:

- clocks to German time (1940)
- drive on right hand side of roads (1941)
- rations (1943, 1944, and 1945)

Forced to accept:

- censorship (1940)
- curfew (1940)
- exchange rate to Reichsmarks (1940)
- census (1940)
- growing vegetables
- food rationing (1940)
- increase in income tax to 4/- (1940)
- identity cards (1941)
- cycling in single file (1941)
- lodgers billeted
- German language in schools
- work from Germans

=== Fortification and construction ===
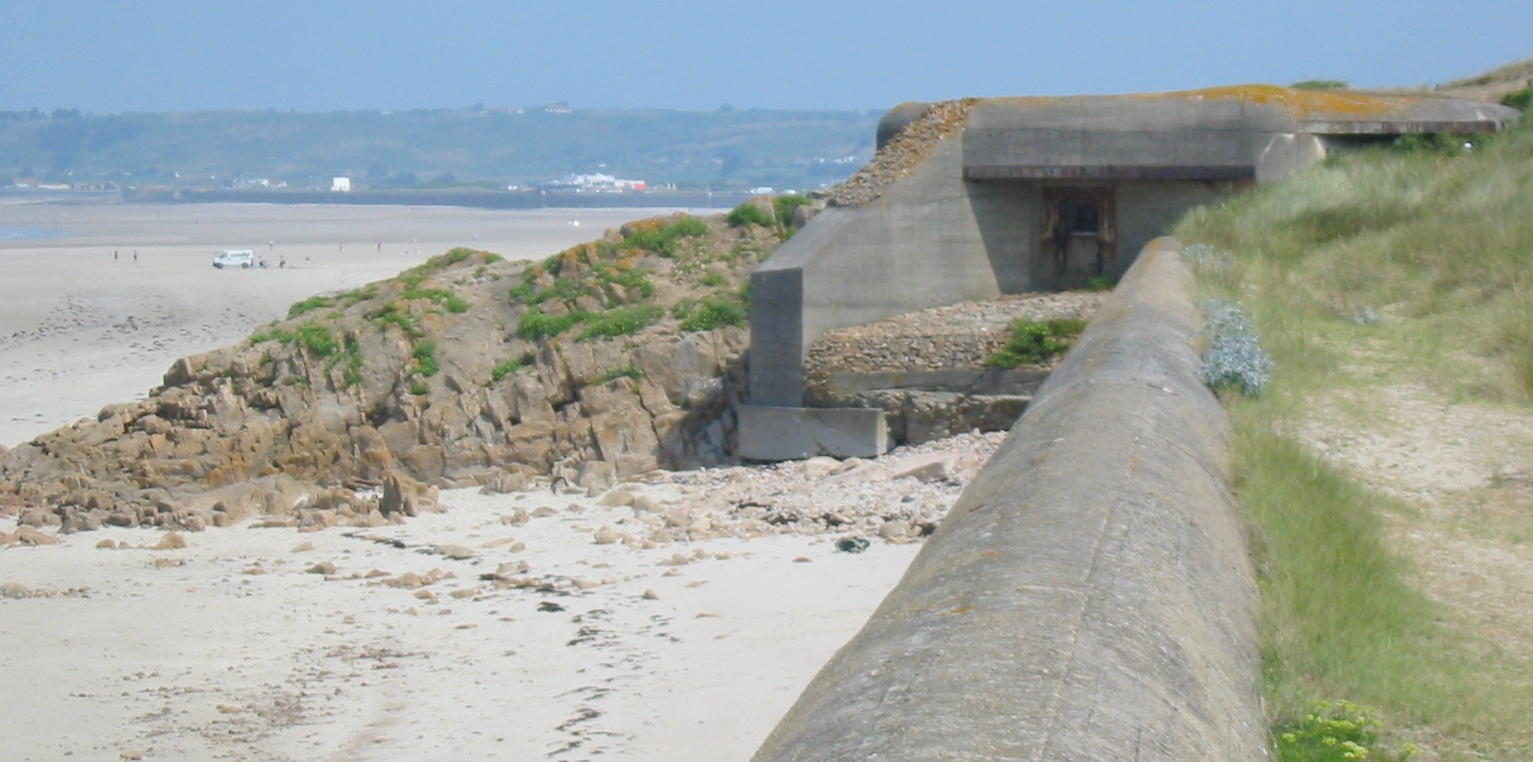
Bunker in St Ouen's Bay, Jersey

As part of the Atlantic Wall, between 1940 and 1945 the occupying German forces and the Organisation Todt constructed fortifications, roads, and other facilities in the Channel Islands. In a letter from the Oberbefehlshaber West dated 16 June 1941, the reinforcing of the islands was to be carried out on orders of Hitler, since an Allied attack "must be reckoned with" in Summer 1941. Much of the work was carried out by imported labour, including thousands from the Soviet Union, under the supervision of the German forces. The Germans transported over 16,000 slave workers to the Channel Islands to build fortifications. Five categories of construction worker were employed (or used) by the Germans.

Paid foreign labour was recruited from occupied Europe, including French, Belgian, and Dutch workers, among whom were members of resistance movements who used the opportunity to travel to gain access to maps and plans.

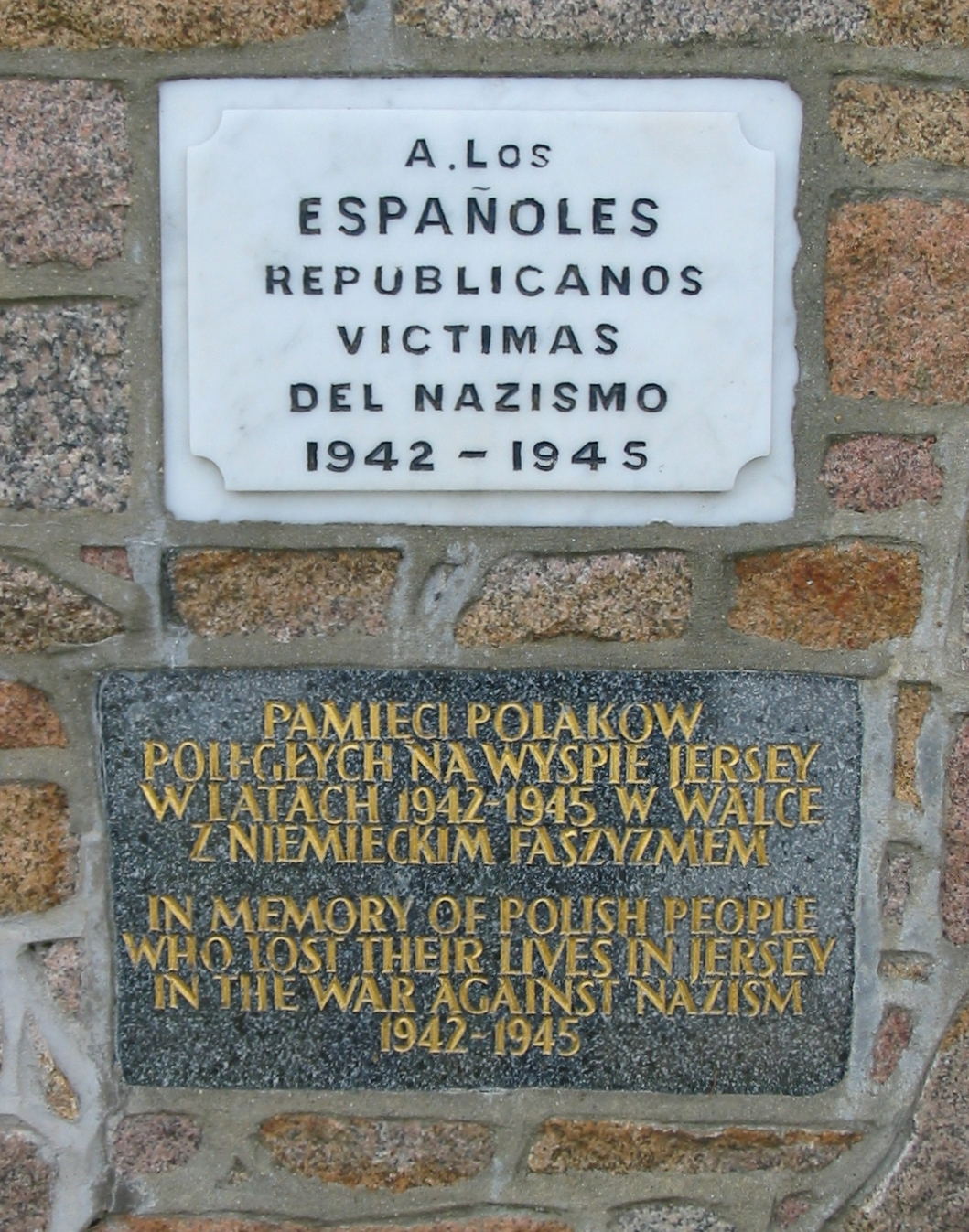
Plaques: "To Republican Spaniards victims of Nazism 1942–1945" – "In memory of Polish people who lost their lives in Jersey in the war against Nazism 1942–1945"

Conscripted labourers from France, Belgium, and the Netherlands were also assigned. In 1941 hundreds of unemployed French Algerians and Moroccans were handed to the Germans by the Vichy government and sent to Jersey. Around 2000 Spaniards who had taken refuge in France after the Spanish Civil War and who had been interned were handed over for forced labour.

Most of the Soviet slave workers came from Ukraine. One thousand French Jews were imported.

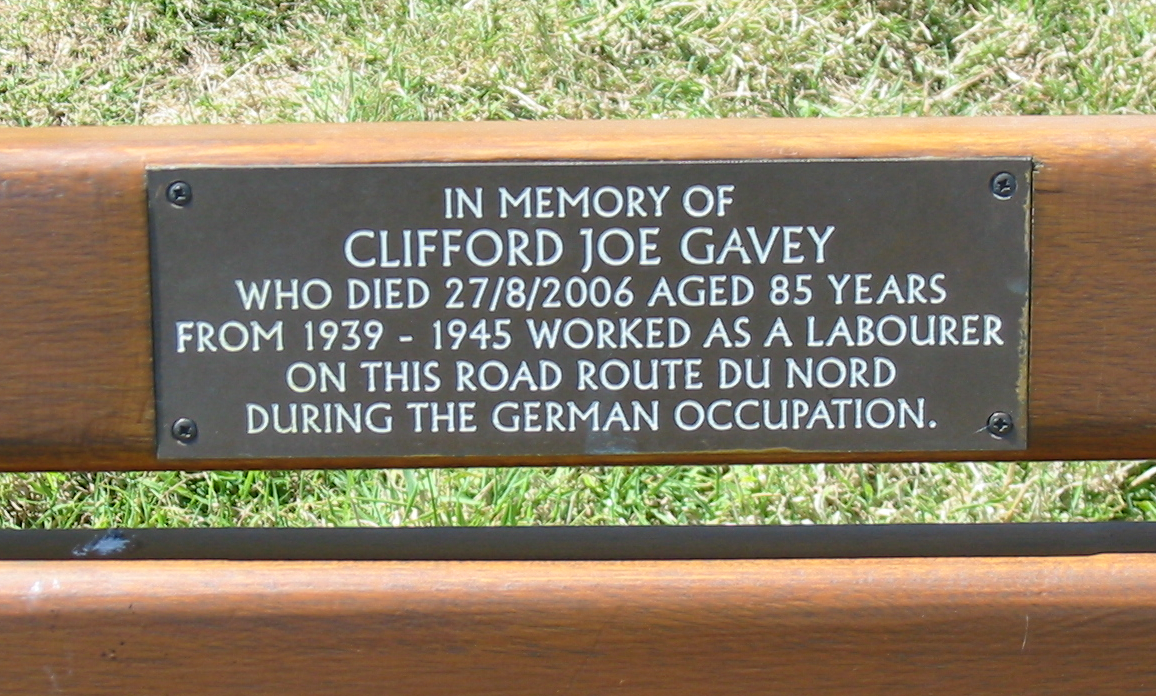
Plaque on bench "In memory of Clifford Joe Gavey who died 27/8/2006 aged 85 years from 1939–1945 worked as a labourer on this road Route du Nord during the German Occupation", Route du Nord, Saint John, Jersey

The problem of the use of local labour arose early in the occupation. In a request for labour dated 19 July 1941, the Oberbefehlshaber West cited the "extreme difficulty" of procuring local civilian labour. On 7 August Deputy Le Quesne, who was in charge of Jersey's Labour Department, refused a German order to provide labour for improvements at Jersey Airport on the grounds that this would be to provide military assistance to the enemy. On 12 August the Germans stated that unless labour was forthcoming men would be conscripted. The builders who had originally built the airport undertook the work under protest. In the face of threats of conscription and deportation to France, resistance to the demands led to an ongoing tussle over the interpretation of the Hague Convention and the definition of military and non-military works. An example that arose was to what extent non-military "gardening" was being intended as military camouflage. On 1 August 1941 the Germans accepted that the Hague Convention laid down that no civilian could be compelled to work on military projects. The case of the reinforcement of sea walls, which could legitimately be described as civilian sea defences (important for islands) but were undeniably of military benefit in terms of coastal defence, showed how difficult it was to distinguish in practice. Economic necessity drove many islanders to take up employment offered by the Germans. The Germans also induced civilian labour by offering those who contravened curfew or other regulations employment on building projects as an alternative to deportation to Germany.

The fifth category of labour comprised British conscientious objectors and Irish citizens. As many of the islands' young men had joined the armed forces at the outbreak of war, there was a shortfall in manual labour on the farms, particularly for the potato crop; 150 registered conscientious objectors associated with the Peace Pledge Union and 456 Irish workers were recruited for Jersey. Some chose to remain and were trapped by the occupation. Some of the conscientious objectors were communists and regarded the German-Soviet pact as a justification for working for the Germans. Others participated in non-violent resistance activities. As the Irish workers were citizens of a neutral country (see Irish neutrality during World War II), they were free to work for the Germans as they wished and many did so. The Germans attempted to foster anti-British and pro-IRA sympathies with propaganda events aimed at the Irish (see also Irish Republican Army – Abwehr collaboration in World War II). John Francis Reilly convinced 72 of his fellow Irishmen in 1942 to volunteer for employment at the Hermann Göring ironworks near Brunswick. Conditions were unpleasant and they returned to Jersey in 1943. Reilly stayed behind in Germany to broadcast on radio and joined the Sicherheitsdienst (SD).

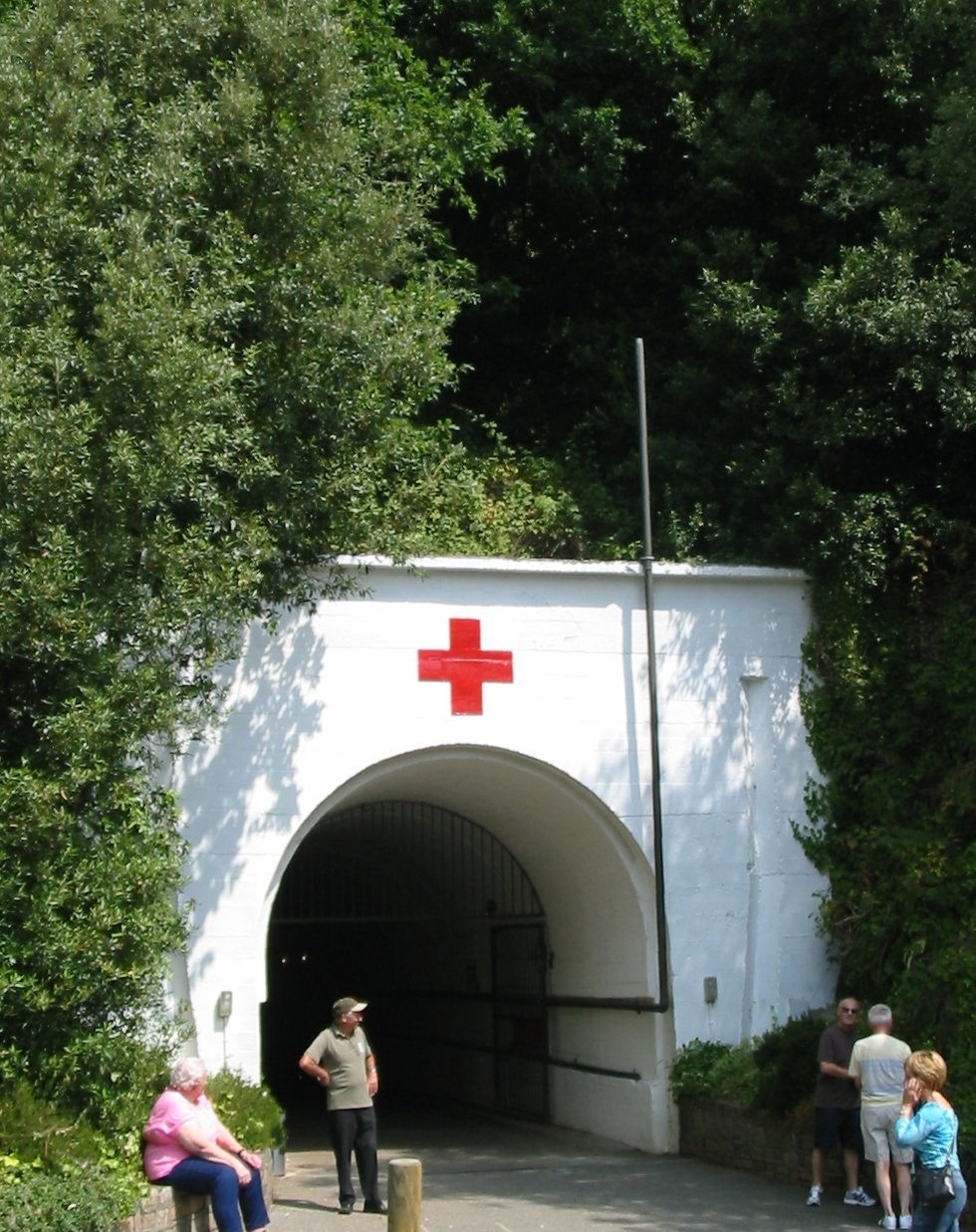
Entrance to the German Underground Hospital in Jersey

The Channel Islands were amongst the most heavily fortified parts of the Atlantic Wall, particularly Alderney which is the closest to France. On 20 October 1941 Hitler signed a directive, against the advice of Commander-in-Chief von Witzleben, to turn the Channel Islands into an "impregnable fortress". In the course of 1942, one twelfth of the resources funnelled into the whole Atlantic Wall was dedicated to the fortification of the Channel Islands. Hitler had decreed that 10% of the steel and concrete used in the Atlantic Wall go to the Channel Islands. It is often said the Channel Islands were better defended than the Normandy beaches, given the large number of tunnels and bunkers around the islands. By 1944 in tunnelling alone, 244,000 cubic metres (8,600,000 cu ft) of rock had been extracted collectively from Guernsey, Jersey, and Alderney (the majority from Jersey). At the same point in 1944 the entire Atlantic Wall from Norway to the Franco-Spanish border, excluding the Channel Islands, had extracted some 225,000 cubic metres (7,900,000 cu ft).

Light railways were built in Jersey and Guernsey to supply coastal fortifications. In Jersey, a 1,000 mm (3 ft 3 3/8 in) gauge line was laid down following the route of the former Jersey Railway from St Helier to La Corbière, with a branch line connecting the stone quarry at Ronez in St John. A 600 mm (1 ft 11 5/8 in) line ran along the west coast, and another was laid out heading east from St Helier to Gorey. The first line was opened in July 1942, the ceremony being disrupted by passively-resisting Jersey spectators. The Alderney Railway was taken over by the Germans who lifted part of the standard gauge line and replaced it with a metre gauge line, worked by two Feldbahn 0-4-0 diesel locomotives. The German railway infrastructure was dismantled after the liberation in 1945.

==== Forced labour camps ====
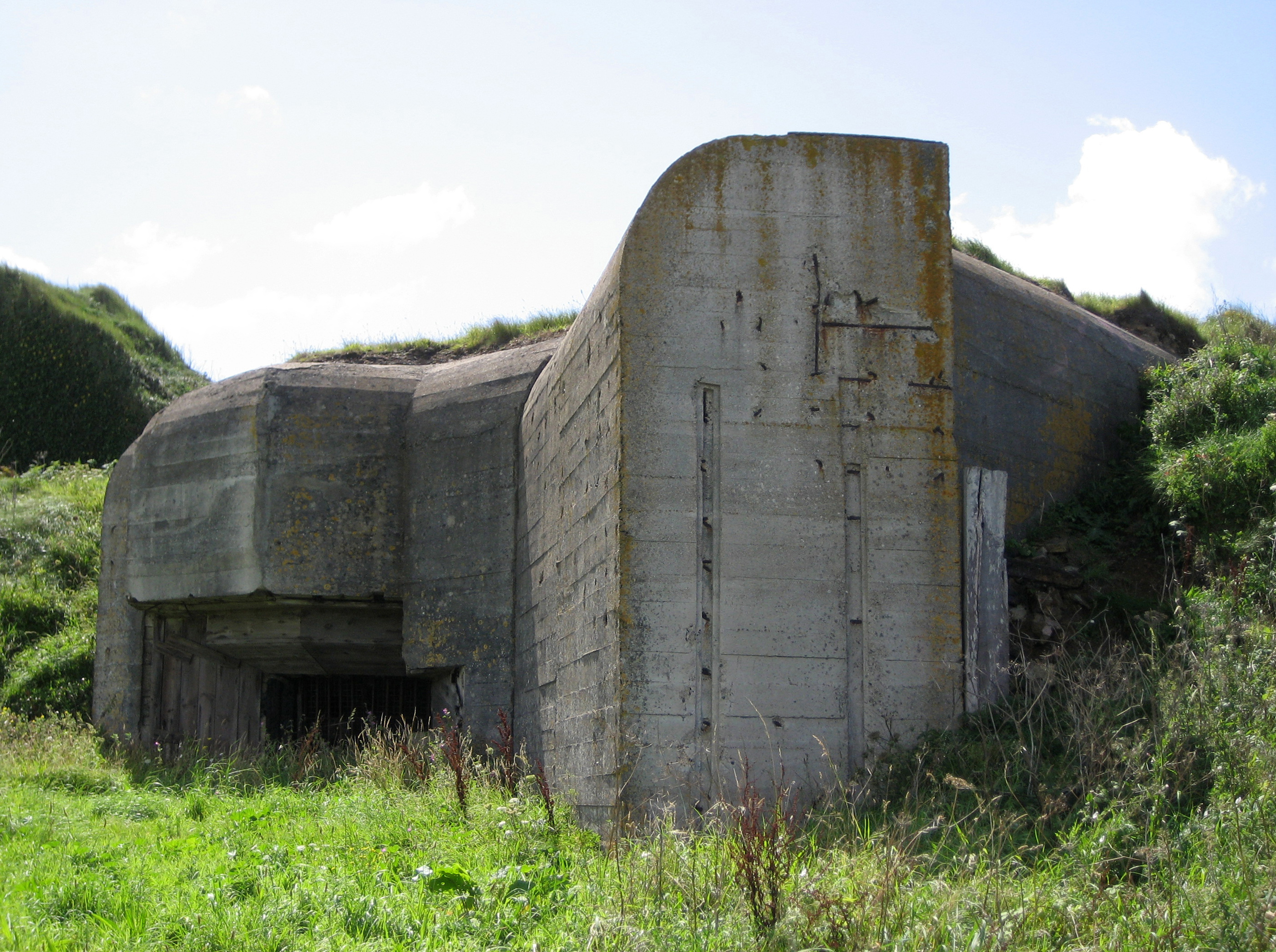
Alderney is still covered in German fortifications built by camp slave labour

The Germans built many camps in Jersey, Guernsey, and four camps in Alderney. The Nazi Organisation Todt operated each camp and used a mixture of volunteer and forced labour to build bunkers, gun emplacements, air raid shelters, and concrete fortifications.

In Alderney the camps commenced operation in January 1942 and had a total inmate population of about 6,000. The Borkum and Helgoland camps were "volunteer" (Hilfswillige) labour camps Lager Borkum was used for German technicians and "volunteers" from European countries. Lager Helgoland was filled with Soviet Organisation Todt workers and the labourers in those camps were paid for work done which was not the case with inmates at the two concentration camps, Sylt and Norderney. The prisoners in Lager Sylt and Lager Norderney were slave labourers; Sylt camp held Jewish forced labourers. Norderney camp housed European (mainly Eastern Europeans but including Spaniards) and Soviet forced labourers. On 1 March 1943, Lager Norderney and Lager Sylt were placed under the control of the SS Hauptsturmführer Max List, turning them into concentration camps.

Over 700 of the inmates of the four camps lost their lives in Alderney or in ships travelling to/from Alderney before the camps were closed and the remaining inmates transferred to France, mainly in mid-1944. The Minotaur, carrying 468 Organisation Todt workers including women and children from Alderney, was hit by Royal Canadian Navy motor torpedo boats near St Malo; about 250 of the passengers were killed by the explosions or by drowning, on 5 July 1944.

In Jersey, Organisation Todt established thirteen forced labour camps:

1. Lager Rommel, Rue au Blanqc, Grouville. 2. Lager Wick, Gorey Marsh, Grouville. 3. Lager Franco, Rue Vardon, Grouiville. 4. Lager Ehrenbreitstein, Fort Regent, St Helier. 5. Lager Hindenburg, Rouge Bullion, St Helier. 6. Lager Seekt, St Aubin's Road/Peoples Park, St. Helier. 7. Lager Schepke, Ruelle du Marais, Beaumont. 8. Lager Udet, Route de Orange, St Brelade. 9. Lager Richthofen, La, Route de la Pulente, St Brelade. 10. Lager Immelmann, Route du Port, St Peter. 11. Lager Brinkforth, Grand Route des Mielles, St Ouen. 12. Lager Mölders, Rue des Cosnets, St. Ouen. 13. Lager Prien, La Rue de la Mare Ballam, St John.

There were also Prisoner-of-War camps: 1. POW camp for French/North African troops, Pier Road, St Helier 2. POW camp for Allied Forces, with two locations at South Hill and Mount Bingham, St Helier.

Unlike mainland Europe, where camps were preserved after the end of WWII to become places of mourning and education, in Jersey, former labour camp sites were returned to agriculture or redeveloped for private housing or public buildings. Lager Wick camp in Grouville is the only camp that underwent archaeological excavation, and its location is signposted.

Westmount Memorial/Slave Workers Memorial was opened in 1971.

Forced Worker Memorial was opened in 2001.

Remembrance Ceremony at Westmount Memorial honours the memory of all foreign victims of unfree labour. Forced Worker Trail tells the stories of escaped workers and islanders who helped them.

Norman Le Brocq's resistance movement, in a successful attempt to raise the morale of the prisoners, created posters and leaflets in both Spanish and Russian to inform the forced labourers of the German defeat at the hands of the Red Army at the Battle of Kursk and Battle of Stalingrad. Le Brocq's network was one of the only active Resistance networks on the channel island to actively sabotage the Nazis. During 1945, he had successfully convinced anti-Nazi German soldiers to plot a mutiny against their officers; however, the island was liberated by Allied forces before the mutiny could begin.

=== Jews ===
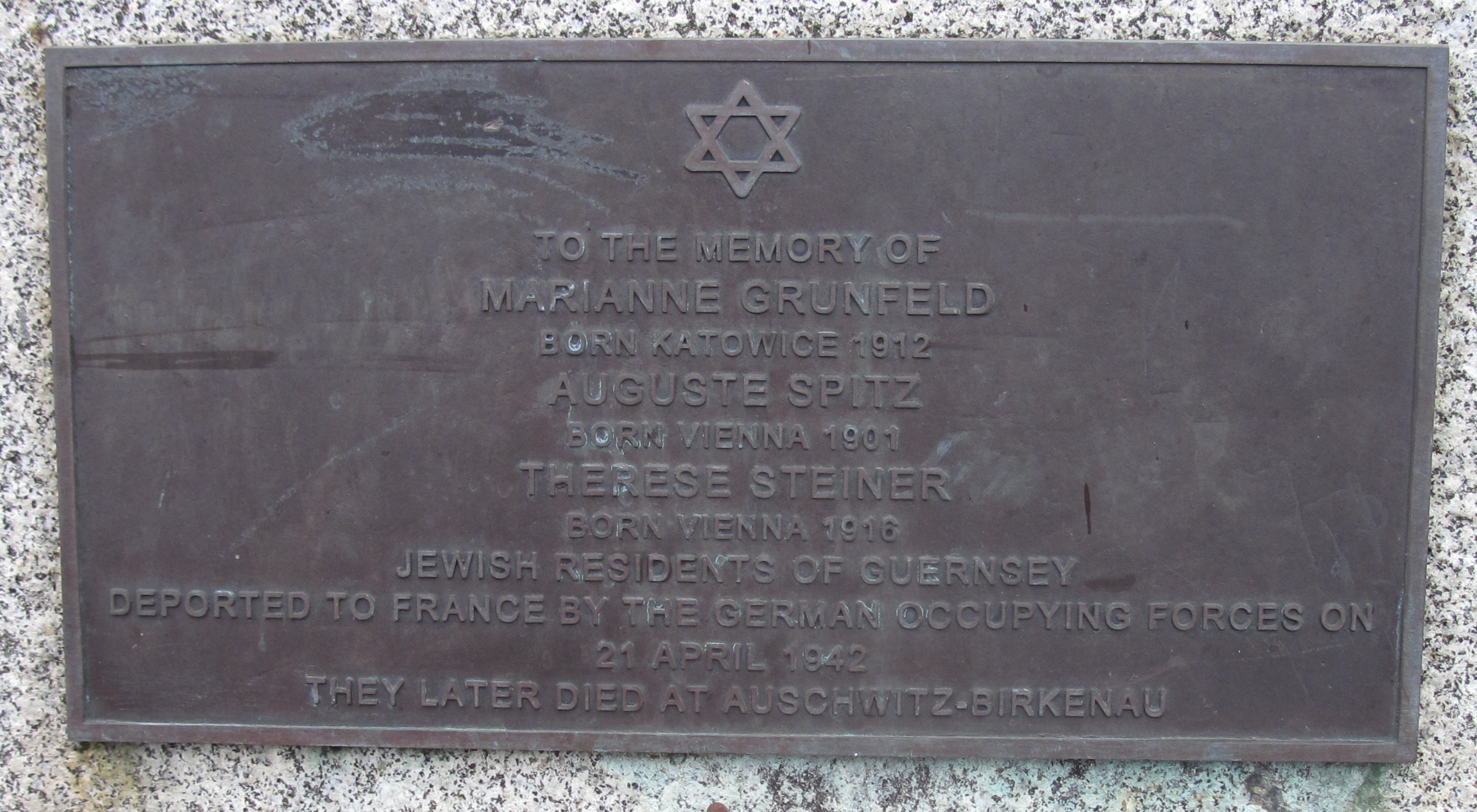
Plaque in Saint Peter Port to the memory of three Jewish residents of Guernsey who were deported and murdered in the Holocaust at Auschwitz

A small number of British and other Jews lived on the Channel Islands during the occupation. Most had been evacuated in June 1940, but British law did not allow enemy citizens, irrespective of their ethnicity, to enter Britain without a permit. When the Germans arrived, 18 Jews registered out of an estimated 30–50. In October 1940 German officials issued the first anti-Jewish Order, which instructed the police to identify Jews as part of the civilian registration process. Island authorities complied, and registration cards were marked with red "J"s; additionally, a list was compiled of Jewish property, including property owned by island Jews who had evacuated, which was turned over to German authorities. The registered Jews in the islands, often Church of England members with one or two Jewish grandparents, were subjected to the nine Orders Pertaining to Measures Against the Jews, including closing their businesses (or placing them under Aryan administration), giving up their wirelesses, and staying indoors for all but one hour per day.

The civil administrations agonised over how far they could oppose the orders. The process developed differently on the three islands. Local officials made some effort to mitigate anti-Semitic measures by the Nazi occupying force, and as such refused to require Jews to wear identifying yellow stars and had most former Jewish businesses returned after the war. Officials in the registration department procured false documents for some of those who fell within categories suspected by the Germans. The anti-Jewish measures were not carried out systematically. Some well-known Jews lived through the occupation in comparative openness, including Marianne Blampied, the wife of artist Edmund Blampied. Three Jewish women of Austrian and Polish nationality, Therese Steiner, Auguste Spitz, and Marianne Grünfeld, had fled Central Europe to Guernsey in the 1930s, but had been unable to leave Guernsey as part of the evacuation in 1940 because they were excluded by UK law. Eighteen months later, Steiner alerted the Germans to her presence. The three women were deported to France in April 1942, and were later sent to Auschwitz, where they were killed or died.

=== Freemasons ===
Freemasonry was suppressed by the Germans. The Masonic Temples in Jersey and Guernsey were ransacked in January 1941 and furnishings and regalia were seized and taken to Berlin for display. Lists of membership of Masonic lodges were examined. The States in both bailiwicks passed legislation to nationalise Masonic property later in 1941 in order to protect the buildings and assets. The legislatures resisted attempts to pass anti-Masonic measures and no individual Freemason was persecuted for his adherence. Scouting was banned, but continued undercover, as did the Salvation Army.

=== Deportations ===
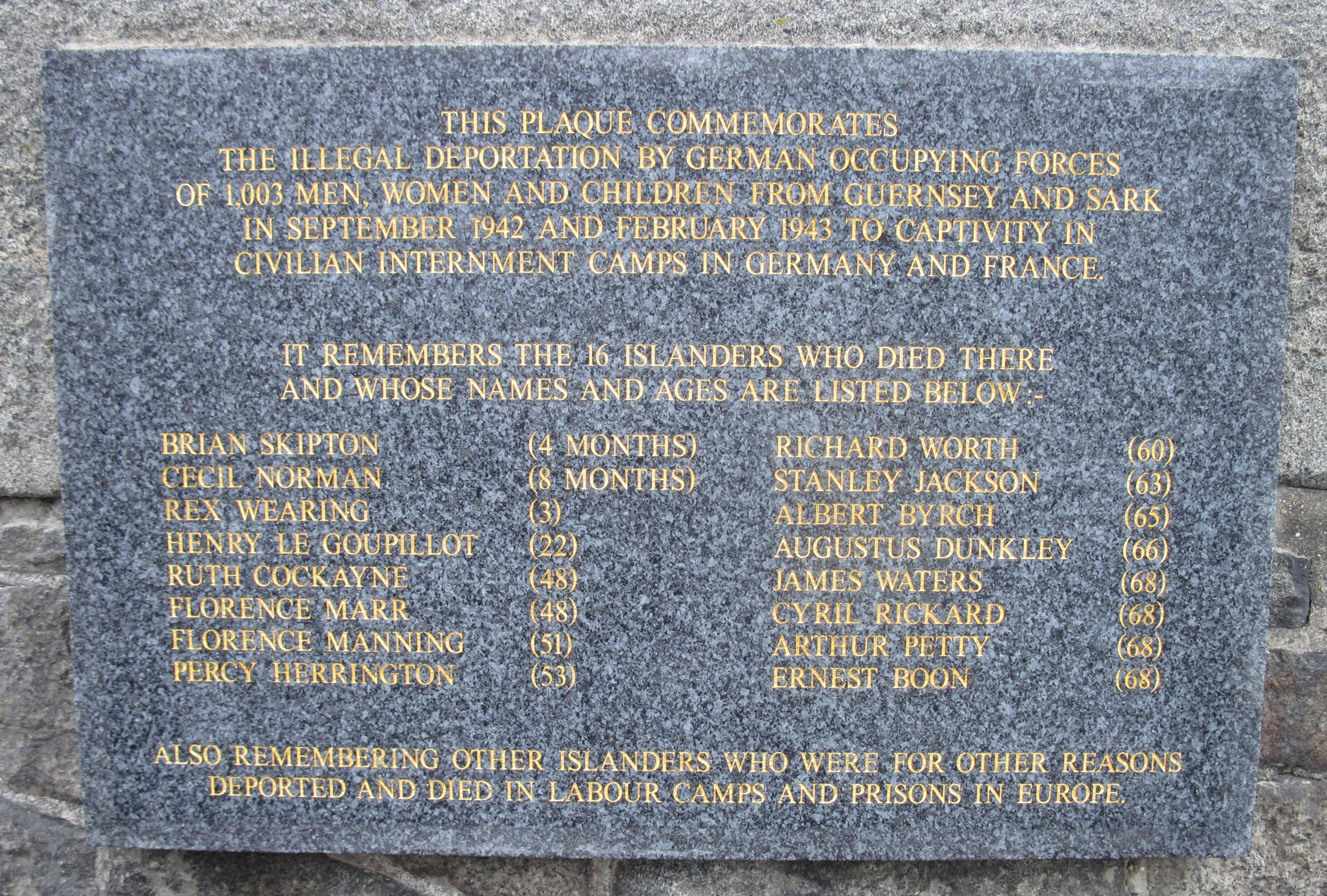
This plaque in Saint Peter Port commemorates 1,003 illegally deported people from Guernsey, and in particular, 16 individual deportees who died in captivity and others who died in prisons and labour camps

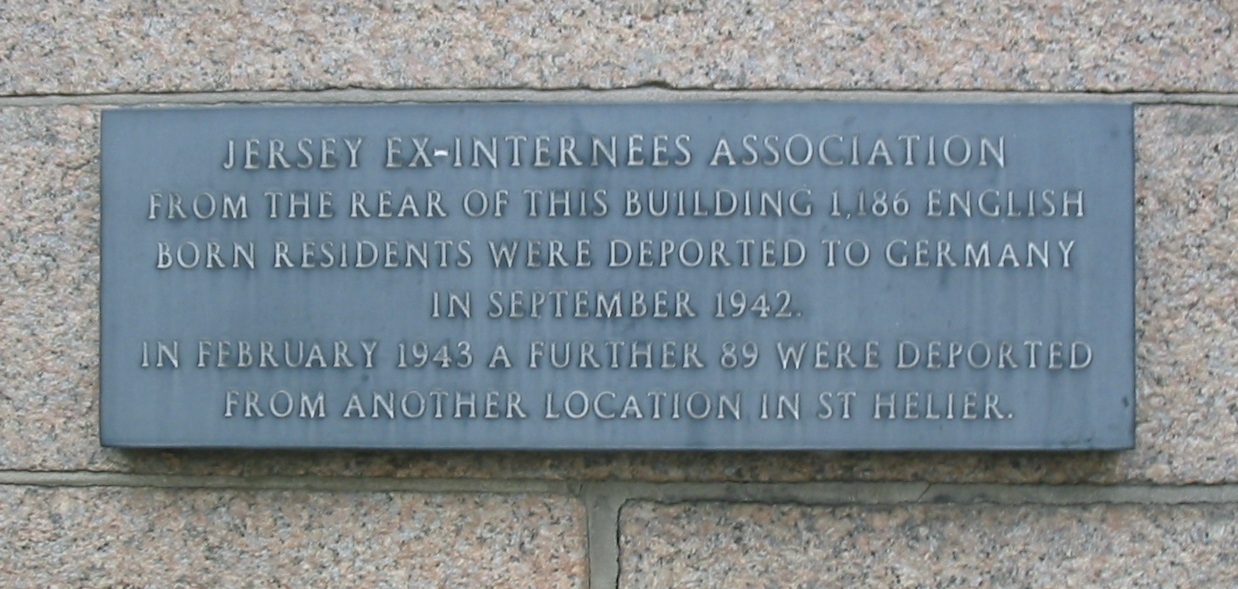
Plaque: "From the rear of this building 1,186 English born residents were deported to Germany in September 1942. In February 1943 a further 89 were deported from another location in St. Helier."

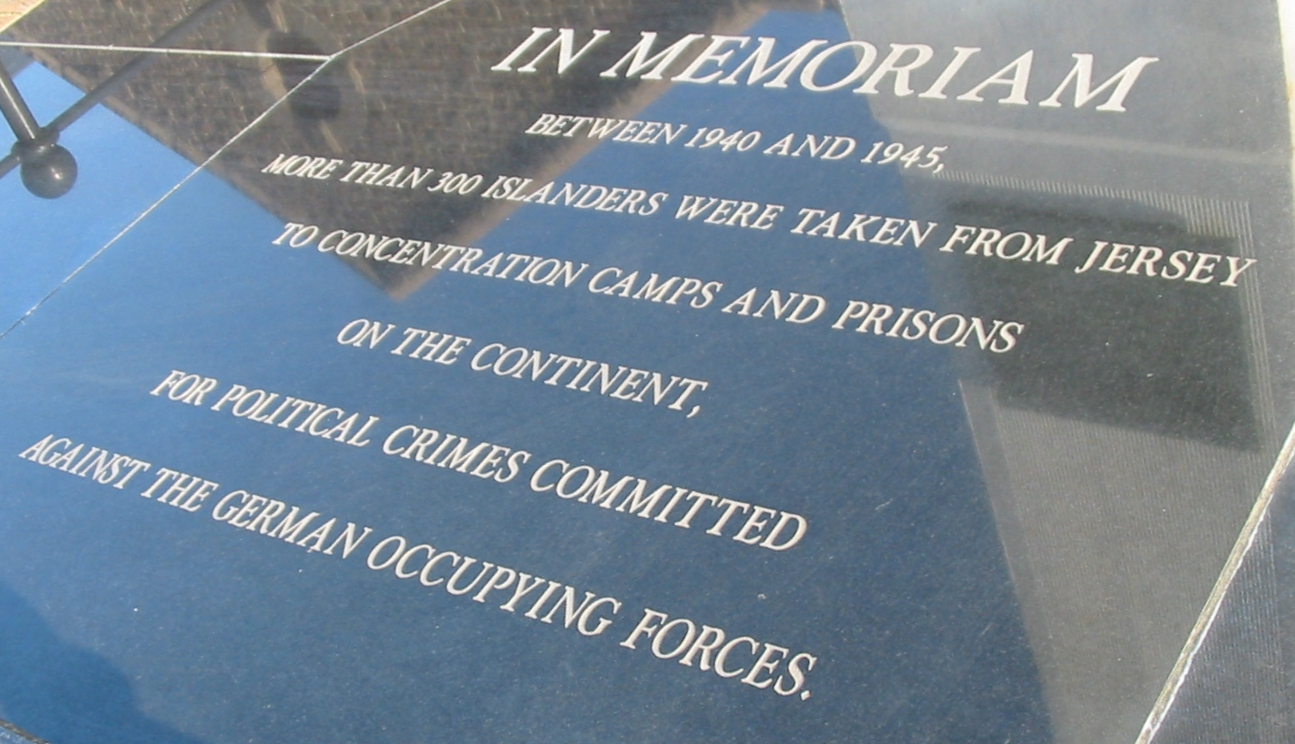
Memorial, St. Helier: "In memoriam: between 1940 and 1945, more than 300 islanders were taken from Jersey to concentration camps and prisons on the continent, for political crimes committed against the German occupying forces."

On specific orders from Adolf Hitler in 1942, the German authorities announced that all residents of the Channel Islands who were not born in the islands, as well as those men who had served as officers in World War I, were to be deported. The majority of them were transported to the south west of Germany, to Ilag V-B at Biberach an der Riss and Ilag VII at Laufen, and to Wurzach. This deportation order was originally issued in 1941, as a reprisal for the 800 German civilians in Iran being deported and interned. The ratio was 20 Channel Islanders to be interned for every German interned but its enactment was delayed and then diluted. The fear of internment caused suicides in all three islands. Guernsey nurse Gladys Skillett, who was five months' pregnant at the time of her deportation to Biberach, became the first Channel Islander to give birth while in captivity in Germany. Of the 2,300 deported, 45 would die before the war ended.

=== Imprisonment ===
In Jersey, 22 islanders are recognised as having died as a consequence of having been sent to Nazi prisons and concentration camps. They are commemorated on Holocaust Memorial Day:

- Clifford Cohu: clergyman, arrested for acts of defiance including preaching against the Germans. After serving time in several prisons, the last of them in Namburg, he died from mistreatment in Zöschen Forced Labour Re-Education Camp in September 1944.
- Walter Allen Dauny: sentenced for theft
- Arthur Dimmery: sentenced for digging up a buried wireless set for Saint Saviour wireless network
- George James Fox: sentenced for theft
- Louisa Gould: arrested for sheltering an escaped slave worker; she died in Ravensbrück in February 1945
- Maurice Jay Gould: arrested following a failed attempt to escape to England
- James Edward Houillebecq: deported following discovery of stolen gun parts and ammunition
- Peter Bruce Johnson: Australian, deported
- Frank René Le Villio: deported for serious military larceny
- William Howard Marsh: arrested for spreading BBC news
- Edward Peter Muels: arrested for helping a German soldier to desert
- John Whitley Nicolle: sentenced as ringleader of Saint Saviour wireless network
- Léonce L'Hermitte Ogier: advocate, arrested for possession of maps of fortifications and a camera, died in internment following imprisonment
- Frederick William Page: sentenced for failing to surrender a wireless set
- Clarence Claude Painter: arrested following a raid that discovered a wireless set, cameras, and photographs of military objects
- Peter Painter: son of Clarence Painter, arrested with his father when a pistol was found in his wardrobe
- Emile Paisnel: sentenced for receiving stolen articles
- Clifford Bond Quérée: sentenced for receiving stolen articles
- Marcel Fortune Rossi, Jr.: deported as a person of Italian heritage
- June Sinclair: hotel worker, sentenced for slapping a German soldier who made improper advances
- John (Jack) Soyer: sentenced for possession of a wireless, escaped from prison in France
- Joseph Tierney: first member of Saint Saviour wireless network to be arrested

In Guernsey, the following are recognised as having died

- Sidney Ashcroft: convicted of serious theft and resistance to officials in 1942. Died in Naumburg prison.
- Joseph Gillingham: was one of the islanders involved in the Guernsey Underground News Service (GUNS). Died in Naumburg prison.
- Marianne Grunfeld: Jewish adult sent to Auschwitz concentration camp
- John Ingrouille: aged 15, found guilty of treason and espionage and sentenced to five years hard labour. Died in Brussels after release in 1945.
- Charles Machon: brainchild of GUNS. Died in Hamelin prison.
- Percy Miller: sentenced to 15 months for wireless offences. Died in Frankfurt prison.
- Marie Ozanne: refused to accept the ban placed on the Salvation Army. Died in Guernsey hospital after leaving prison.
- Auguste Spitz: Jewish adult sent to Auschwitz concentration camp
- Therese Steiner: Jewish adult sent to Auschwitz concentration camp
- Louis Symes: sheltered his son 2nd Lt James Symes, who was on a commando mission to the island. Died in Cherche-Midi prison

== Resistance ==
One of the first resistance cells created was the Jersey Communist Party, created by a teenage activist called Norman Le Brocq and two other young activists belonging to the Communist Party of Great Britain (CPGB). Using this cell, Norman Le Brocq helped create an umbrella organisation known as the Jersey Democratic Movement (JDM), to unite both communist and non-communist resistance across the island.

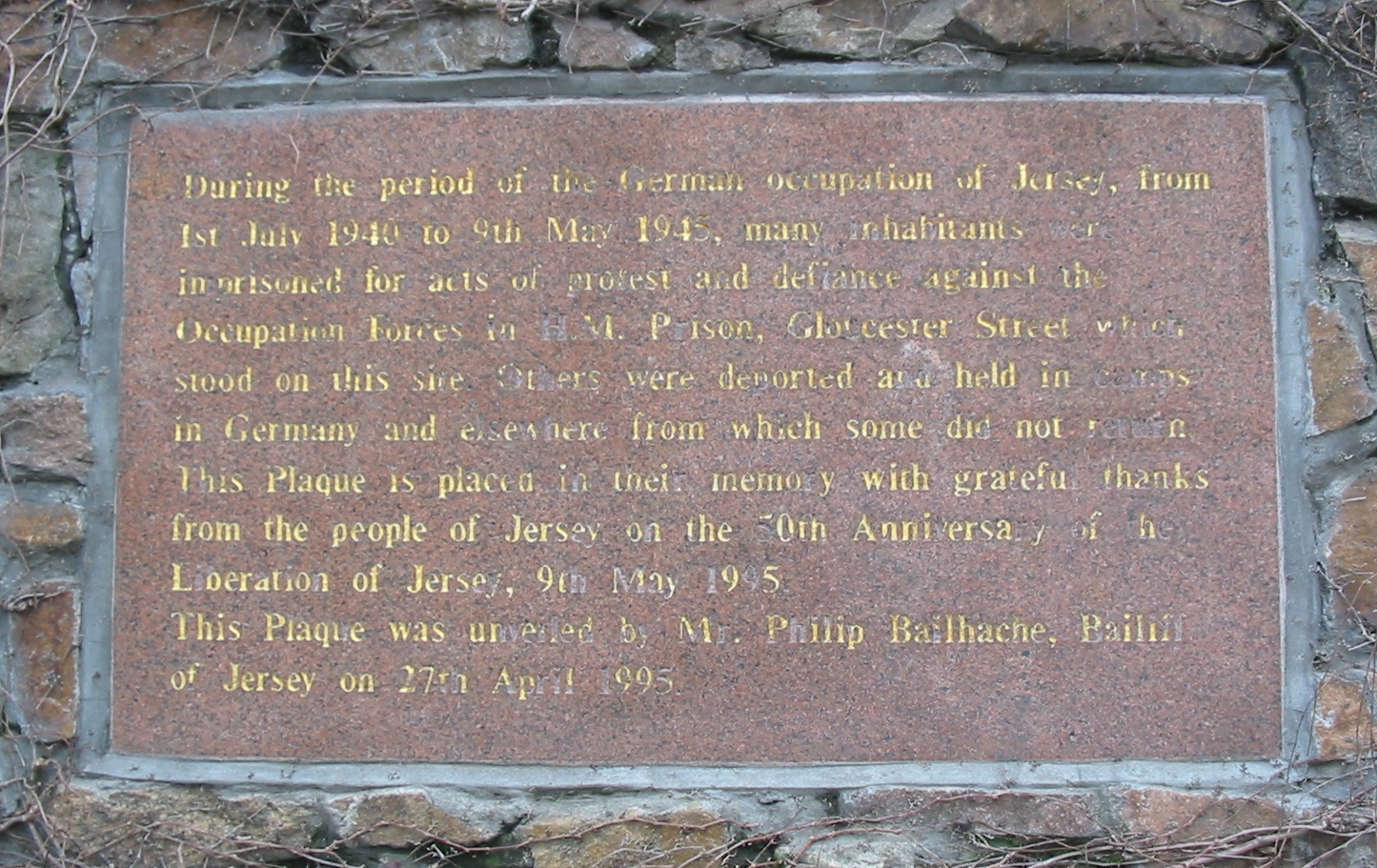
Plaque: "During the period of the German occupation of Jersey, from 1 July 1940 to 9 May 1945, many inhabitants were imprisoned for acts of protest and defiance against the Occupation Forces in H.M. Prison, Gloucester Street, which stood on this site. Others were deported and held in camps in Germany and elsewhere from which some did not return."

The size of the population actively resisting German occupation in continental European countries was between 0.6% and 3%, and the percentage of the islands' populations participating in active resistance was comparable. From a wartime population of 66,000 in the Channel Islands a total of around 4000 islanders were sentenced for breaking laws (around 2600 in Jersey and 1400 in Guernsey), although many of these were for ordinary criminal acts rather than resistance. 570 prisoners were sent to continental prisons and camps, and at least 22 Jerseymen and 9 Guernseymen did not return. Willmott estimated that over 200 people in Jersey provided material and moral support to escaped forced workers, including over 100 who were involved in the network of safe houses sheltering escapees.

No islanders joined active German military units though a small number of UK men who had been stranded on the islands at the start of the occupation joined up from prison. Eddie Chapman, an Englishman, was in prison for burglary in Jersey when the invasion occurred, and offered to work for the Germans as a spy under the code name Fritz, and later became a British double agent under the code name ZigZag.

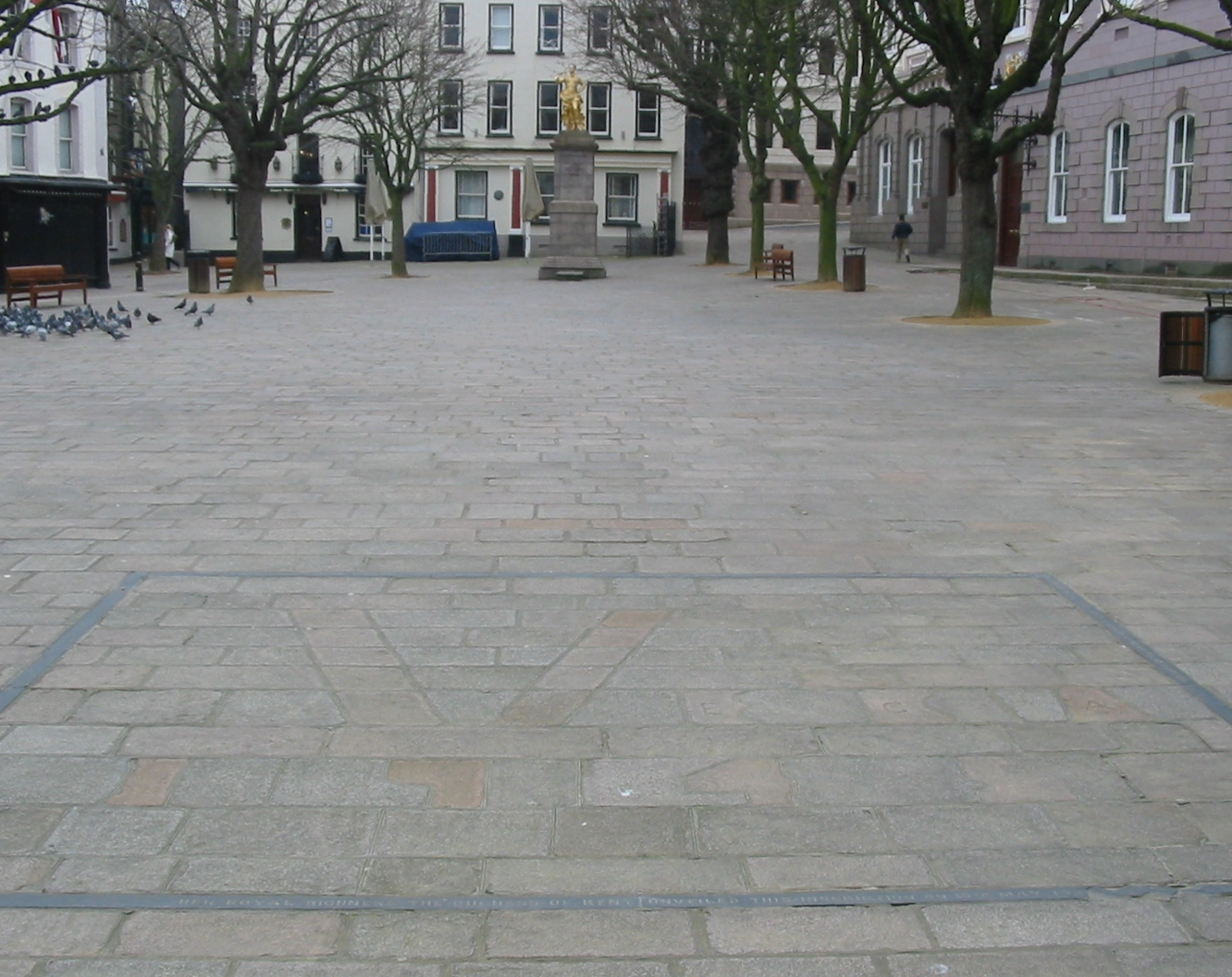
During the German occupation of Jersey, a stonemason repairing the paving of the Royal Square incorporated a V for victory under the noses of the occupiers. This was later amended to refer to the Red Cross ship Vega. The addition of the date 1945 and a more recent frame has transformed it into a monument.

Resistance involved passive resistance, acts of minor sabotage, sheltering and aiding escaped slave workers, and publishing underground newspapers containing news from BBC radio. There was no armed resistance movement in the Channel Islands. Much of the population of military age had already joined the British or French armed forces. Due to the small size of the islands, most resistance involved individuals risking their lives to save someone else. The British government did not encourage resistance in the Channel Islands. Islanders joined in Churchill's V sign campaign by daubing the letter "V" (for Victory) over German signs.

The Germans initially followed a policy of presenting a non-threatening presence to the resident population for its propaganda value ahead of an eventual invasion and occupation of the United Kingdom. Many islanders were willing to go along with the necessities of occupation as long as they felt the Germans were behaving in a correct and legal way. Two events particularly jolted many islanders out of this passive attitude: the confiscation of radios, and the deportation of large sections of the population.

In May 1942, three youngsters, Peter Hassall, Maurice Gould, and Denis Audrain, attempted to escape from Jersey in a boat. Audrain drowned, and Hassall and Gould were imprisoned in Germany, where Gould died. Following this escape attempt, restrictions on small boats and watercraft were introduced, restrictions were imposed on the ownership of photographic equipment (the boys had been carrying photographs of fortifications with them), and radios were confiscated from the population. A total of 225 islanders, such as Peter Crill, escaped from the islands to England or France: 150 from Jersey, and 75 from Guernsey. The number of escapes increased after D-Day, when conditions in the islands worsened as supply routes to the continent were cut off and the desire to join in the liberation of Europe increased.

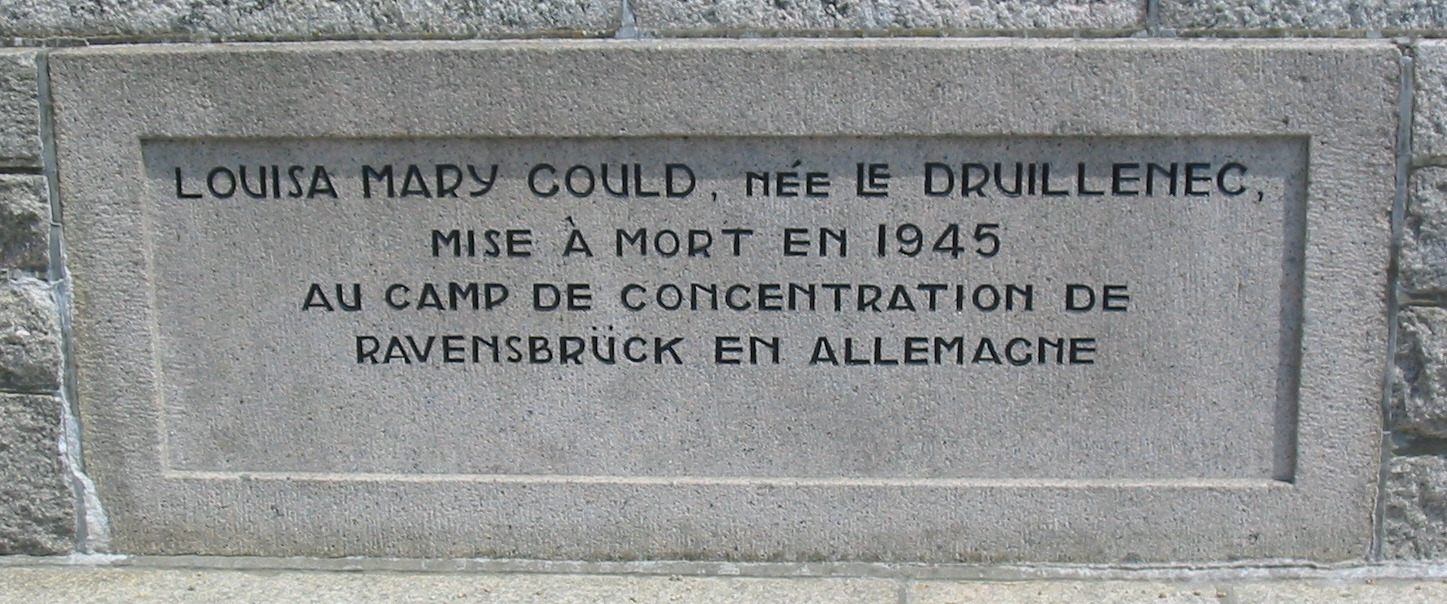
Plaque on war memorial, Saint Ouen, Jersey, to Louisa Mary Gould, victim of Nazi concentration camp Ravensbrück: Louisa Mary Gould, née Le Druillenec, mise à mort en 1945 au camp de concentration de Ravensbrück en Allemagne. Louisa Gould hid a wireless set and sheltered an escaped Soviet prisoner. Betrayed by an informer at the end of 1943, she was arrested and sentenced on 22 June 1944. In August 1944 she was transported to Ravensbrück where she died on 13 February 1945. In 2010 she was posthumously awarded the honour British Hero of the Holocaust.

Listening to the BBC had been banned in the first few weeks of the occupation and then (surprisingly given the policy elsewhere in Nazi-occupied Europe) tolerated for a time before being once again prohibited. In 1942 the ban became draconian, with all radio listening (even to German stations) being banned by the occupiers, a ban backed up by the confiscation of wireless sets. Denied access to BBC broadcasts, the populations of the islands felt increased resentment against the Germans and increasingly sought to undermine the rules. Hidden radio receivers and underground news distribution networks spread. Many islanders hid their sets (or replaced them with home-made crystal sets) and continued listening to the BBC, despite the risk of being discovered by the Germans or being informed on by neighbours. The regular raids by German personnel hunting for radios further alienated the population.

A shortage of coinage in Jersey (partly caused by occupying troops taking away coins as souvenirs) led to the passing of the Currency Notes (Jersey) Law on 29 April 1941. Banknotes designed by Edmund Blampied were issued by the States of Jersey in denominations of 6 pence (6d), 1, 2 and 10 shillings (10/–), and 1 pound (£1). The 6d note was designed by Blampied in such a way that the word six on the reverse incorporated an outsized "X" so that when the note was folded, the result was the resistance symbol "V" for victory. A year later he was asked to design six new postage stamps for the island, in denominations of ½d to 3d. As a sign of resistance, he incorporated into the design for the 3d stamp the script initials GR (for Georgius Rex) on either side of the "3" to display loyalty to King George VI. Edmund Blampied also forged stamps for documents for fugitives.

The deportations of 1942 sparked the first mass demonstrations against the occupation. The illegality and injustice of the measure, in contrast to the Germans' earlier showy insistence on legality and correctness, outraged those who remained behind and encouraged many to turn a blind eye to the resistance activities of others in passive support.

Soon after the sinking of HMS Charybdis on 23 October 1943, the bodies of 21 members of the Royal Navy and Royal Marines were washed up in Guernsey. The German authorities buried them with full military honours. The funerals became an opportunity for some of the islanders to demonstrate their loyalty to Britain and their opposition to the occupiers: around 5,000 islanders attended the funeral, laying 900 wreaths – enough of a demonstration against the occupation for subsequent military funerals to be closed to civilians by the German occupiers.

Some island women fraternised with the occupying forces. This was frowned upon by the majority of islanders, who gave them the derogatory nickname Jerry-bags. According to the Ministry of Defence, a very high proportion of women "from all classes and families" had sexual relations with the enemy, and 800–900 children were born to German fathers. The Germans estimated their troops had been responsible for fathering 60 to 80 out-of-wedlock births in the Channel Islands. As far as official figures went, 176 out of wedlock births had been registered in Jersey between July 1940 and May 1945; in Guernsey 259 out of wedlock births between July 1941 and June 1945 (the disparity in the official figures is explained by differing legal definitions of non-marital births in the two jurisdictions). The German military authorities tried to prohibit sexual fraternisation to reduce incidences of sexually transmitted diseases. They opened brothels for soldiers, staffed with French prostitutes under German medical surveillance.

The sight of brutality against slave workers brought home to many islanders the reality of the Nazi ideology behind the punctilious façade of the occupation. Forced marches between camps and work sites by wretched workers and open public beatings rendered visible the brutality of the régime.

== British government reaction ==
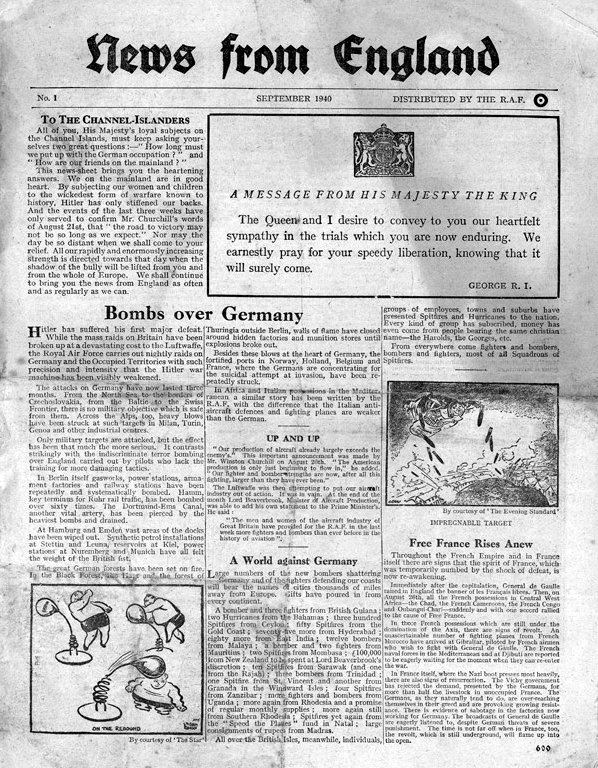
British newspaper dropped on the islands shortly after the occupation, in September 1940

His Majesty's government's reaction to the German invasion was muted, with the Ministry of Information issuing a press release shortly after the Germans landed.

On several occasions British aircraft dropped propaganda newspapers and leaflets on the islands.

=== Raids on the Channel Islands ===
- On 6 July 1940, 2nd Lieutenant Hubert Nicolle, a Guernseyman serving with the British Army, was dispatched on a fact-finding mission to Guernsey, Operation Anger. He was dropped off the south coast of Guernsey by a submarine and paddled ashore in a canoe under cover of night. This was the first of two visits which Nicolle made to the island. Following the second, he missed his rendezvous and was trapped on Guernsey. After a month and a half in hiding, he gave himself up to the German authorities and was sent to a German prisoner-of-war camp.
- On the night of 14 July 1940, Operation Ambassador was launched on Guernsey by men drawn from H Troop of No. 3 Commando under John Durnford-Slater and No. 11 Independent Company. The raiders failed to make contact with the German garrison. Four commandos were left behind and were taken prisoner.
- Operation Dryad was a successful raid on the Casquets lighthouse on 2–3 September 1942.
- Operation Branford was an uneventful raid against Burhou, an island near Alderney, on 7–8 September 1942.
- In October 1942, there was a British Commando raid on Sark, named Operation Basalt. Three German soldiers were killed and one captured. Actions taken by the Commandos resulted in German retaliatory action against Channel Islanders and an order to execute captured Commandos.
- Operation Huckaback was a raid originally planned for the night of 9/10 February 1943, as simultaneous raids on Herm, Jethou and Brecqhou. The objective was to take prisoners and gain information about the situation in the occupied Channel Islands. Cancelled because of bad weather, Huckaback was reinvented as a raid on Herm alone. Landing on Herm and finding the island unoccupied, the Commandos left.
- Operation Pussyfoot was also a raid on Herm, but thick fog on 3–4 April 1943 foiled the raid and the Commandos did not land.
- Operation Hardtack was a series of commando raids in the Channel Islands and the northern coast of France in December 1943. Hardtack 28 landed on Jersey on 25–26 December, and after climbing the northern cliff the Commandos spoke to locals, but did not find any Germans. They suffered two casualties when a mine exploded on the return journey. One of the wounded, Captain Phillip Ayton, died of his wounds some days later. Hardtack 7 was a raid on Sark on 26–27 December, failing to climb the cliffs, they returned on 27–28 December, but two were killed and most others wounded by mines when climbing, resulting in the operation failing.

In 1943, Vice Admiral Lord Mountbatten proposed a plan to retake the islands named Operation Constellation. The proposed attack was never mounted.

=== Bombing and ship attacks on the islands ===
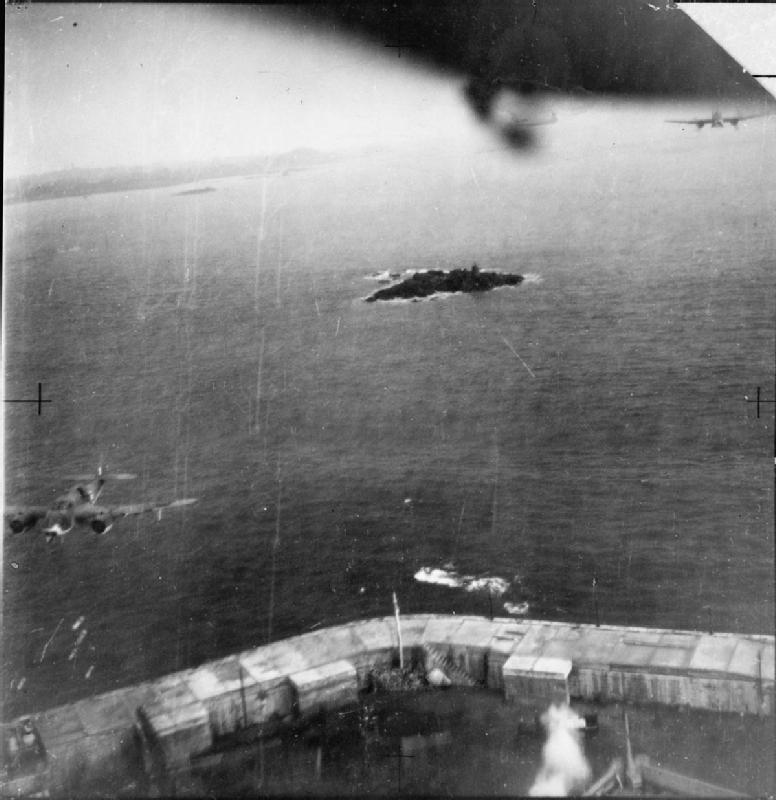
A low-level oblique photograph taken from one of 3 Bristol Beauforts of No. 86 Squadron RAF, attacking shipping in St Peter Port, Guernsey. The aircraft are passing over St Julian's Pier at its junction with White Rock Pier: bombs can be seen falling from the aircraft in the left-hand corner, which was itself nearly hit by bombs dropped from the photographing aircraft (seen exploding at the bottom).

The RAF carried out the first bombing raids in 1940 even though there was little but propaganda value in the attacks, the risk of hitting non-military targets was great and there was a fear of German reprisals against the civilian population. Twenty-two Allied air attacks on the Channel Islands during the war resulted in 93 deaths and 250 injuries, many being Organisation Todt workers in the harbours or on transports. Thirteen air crew died.

There were fatalities caused by naval attacks amongst German soldiers and sailors, civilians, and Organisation Todt workers including the Minotaur carrying 468 Organisation Todt workers including women and children from Alderney that was hit by Royal Canadian Navy motor torpedo boats near St Malo, about 250 of the passengers killed by the explosions or by drowning, on 5 July 1944.

In June 1944, Battery Blücher, a 150mm German artillery emplacement in Alderney, opened fire on American troops on the Cherbourg peninsula. HMS Rodney was called up on 12 August to fire at the battery. Using an aircraft as a spotter, it fired 72x16-inch shells at a range of 25 miles (40 km). Two Germans were killed, and several injured with two of the four guns damaged. Three guns were back in action in August, the fourth by November. The naval gunfire was not very effective.

=== Representation in London ===
As self-governing Crown Dependencies, the Channel Islands had no elected representatives in the British Parliament. It therefore fell to evacuees and other islanders living in the United Kingdom prior to the occupation to ensure that the islanders were not forgotten. The Jersey Society in London, which had been formed in 1896, provided a focal point for exiled Jerseymen. In 1943, several influential Guernseymen living in London formed the Guernsey Society to provide a similar focal point and network for Guernsey exiles. Besides relief work, these groups also undertook studies to plan for economic reconstruction and political reform after the end of the war. The pamphlet Nos Îles published in London by a committee of islanders was influential in the 1948 reform of the constitutions of the Bailiwicks. Sir Donald Banks felt that there must be an informed voice and body of opinion among exiled Guernseymen and women that could influence the British Government, and assist the insular authorities after the hostilities were over. In 1942, he was approached by the Home Office to see if anything could be done to get over a reassuring message to the islanders, as it was known that, despite the fact that German authorities had banned radios, the BBC was still being picked up secretly in Guernsey and Jersey. It was broadcast by the BBC on 24 April 1942.

Bertram Falle, a Jerseyman, had been elected Member of Parliament (MP) for Portsmouth in 1910. Eight times elected to the House of Commons, in 1934 he was raised to the House of Lords with the title of Lord Portsea. During the occupation he represented the interests of islanders and pressed the British government to relieve their plight, especially after the islands were cut off following D-Day.

Committees of émigré Channel islanders elsewhere in the British Empire also banded together to provide relief for evacuees. For example, Philippe William Luce (writer and journalist, 1882–1966) founded the Vancouver Channel Islands Society in 1940 to raise money for evacuees.

== Under siege ==
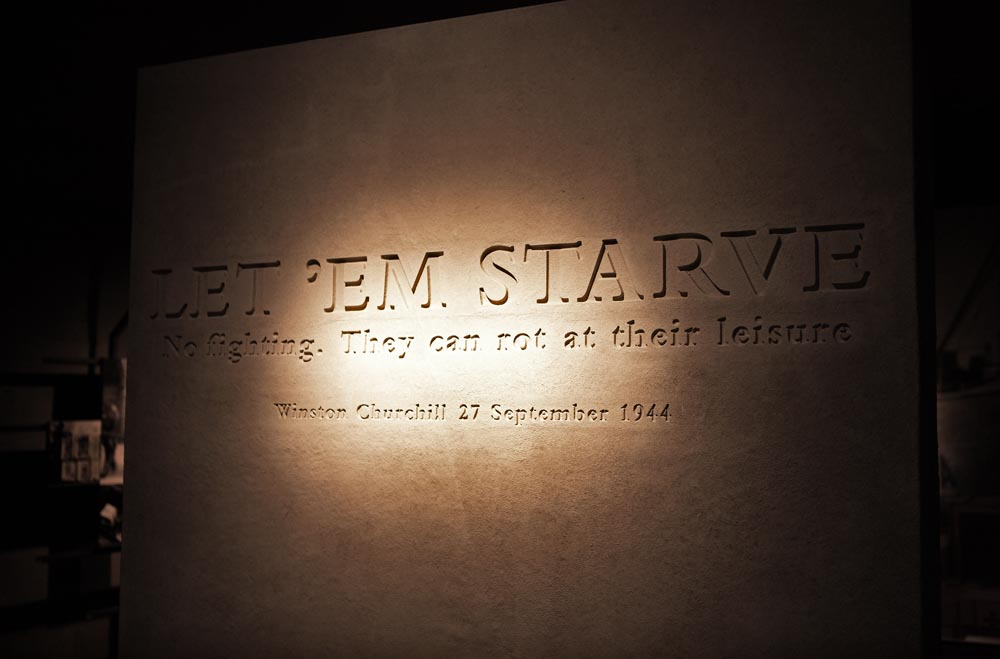
"Let 'em starve. No fighting. They can rot at their leisure." Winston Churchill, 27 September 1944. This quote is displayed at Jersey War Tunnels

During June 1944, the Allied Forces launched the D-Day landings and the liberation of Normandy. They decided to bypass the Channel Islands due to their heavy fortifications. As a result, German supply lines for food and other supplies through France were completely severed. The islanders' food supplies were already dwindling, and this made matters considerably worse – the islanders and German forces alike were on the point of starvation.

In August 1944, the German Foreign Ministry made an offer to Britain, through the Swiss Red Cross, that would see the release and evacuation of all Channel Island civilians except for men of military age. This was not a possibility that the British had envisaged. The British considered the offer, a memorandum from Winston Churchill stating "Let 'em starve. No fighting. They can rot at their leisure". The German offer was rejected in late September.

In September 1944 a ship sailed from France to Guernsey under a white flag. The American on board asked the Germans if they were aware of their hopeless position. The Germans refused to discuss surrender terms and the American sailed away.

It took months of protracted negotiations before the International Committee of the Red Cross ship SS Vega was permitted to bring relief to the starving islanders in December 1944, carrying Red Cross parcels, salt and soap, as well as medical and surgical supplies. Vega made five further trips to the islands, the last after the islands were liberated on 9 May 1945.

The Granville Raid occurred on the night of 8–9 March 1945, when a German raiding force from the Channel Islands landed in Allied-occupied France and brought back supplies to their base. Granville had been the headquarters of Dwight D. Eisenhower for three weeks, six months earlier.

== Liberation ==
=== Liberation ===
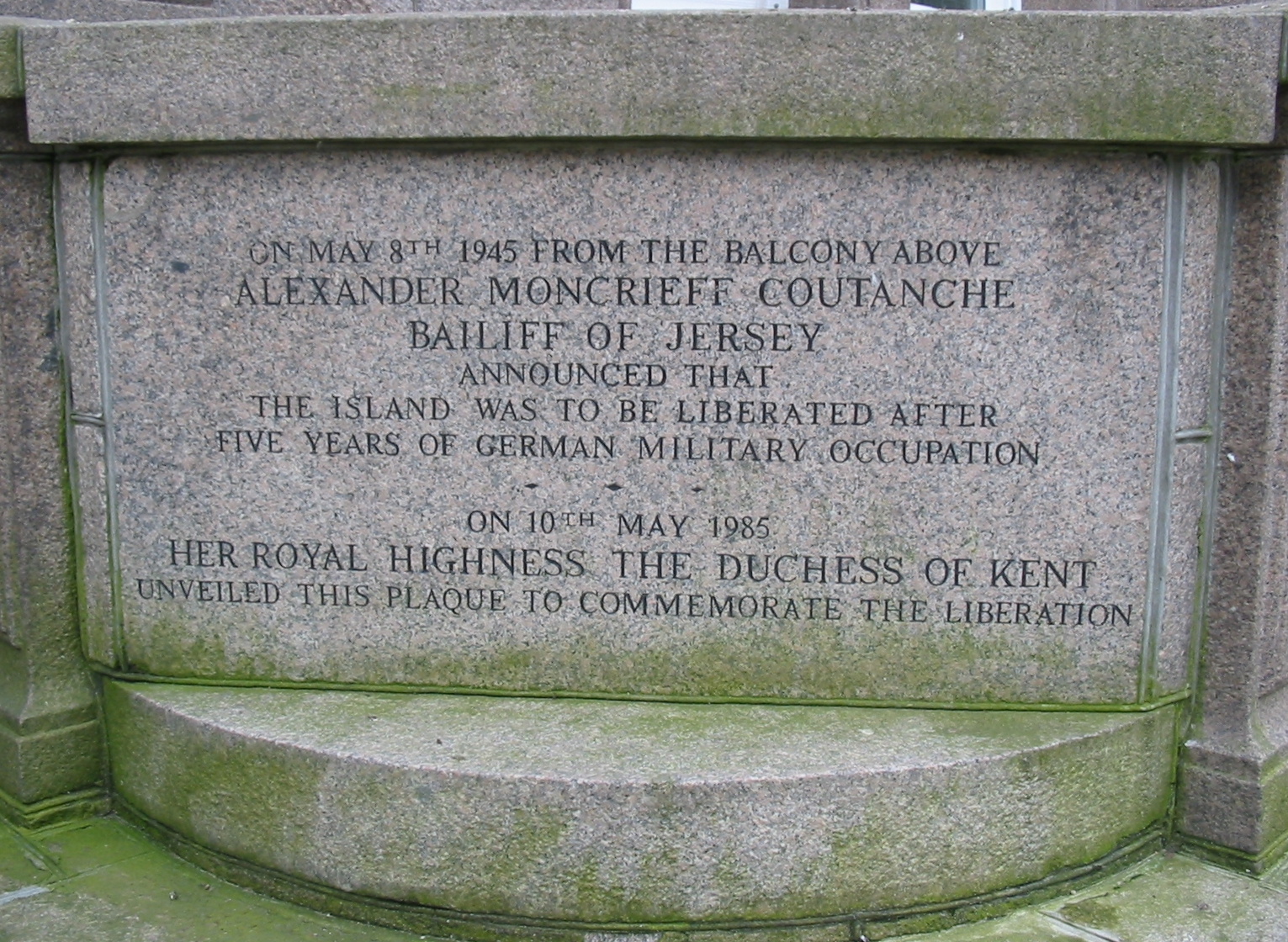
Plaque in the Royal Square, St Helier: On 8 May 1945 from the balcony above Alexander Moncrieff Coutanche, Bailiff of Jersey, announced that the island was to be liberated after five years of German military occupation. On 10 May 1985, the Duchess of Kent unveiled this plaque to commemorate the Liberation.

Although plans had been drawn up and proposed in 1943 by Vice Admiral Lord Louis Mountbatten for Operation Constellation, a military reconquest of the islands, these plans were never carried out. The Channel Islands were liberated after the German surrender.

On 8 May 1945 at 10:00 the islanders were informed by the German authorities that the war was over. Churchill made a radio broadcast at 15:00 during which he announced that:

Hostilities will end officially at one minute after midnight tonight, but in the interests of saving lives the "Cease fire" began yesterday to be sounded all along the front, and our dear Channel Islands are also to be freed today.

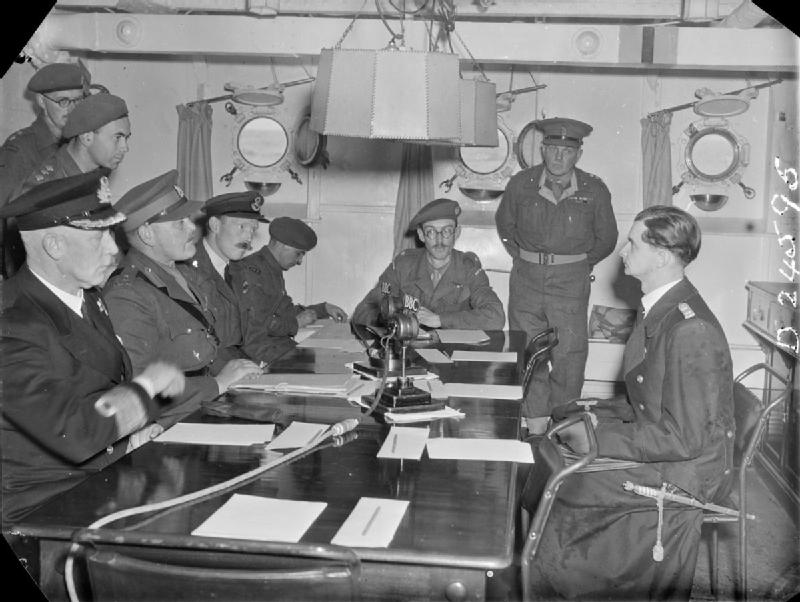
A scene on board HMS Bulldog during the first conference with Kapitänleutnant Zimmermann prior to the signing of the surrender document which liberated the Channel Islands on 9 May 1945. Left to right around the table are: Admiral Stuart (Royal Navy), Brigadier A E Snow (Chief British Emissary), Captain H Herzmark (Intelligence Corps), Wing Commander Archie Steward (Royal Air Force), Lieutenant Colonel E A Stoneman, Major John Margeson, Colonel H R Power (all of the British Army) and Kapitänleutnant Zimmermann (German Kriegsmarine).

The following morning, 9 May 1945, HMS Bulldog arrived in St Peter Port, Guernsey and the German forces surrendered unconditionally aboard the vessel at dawn. British forces landed in St Peter Port shortly afterwards.

HMS Beagle, which had set out at the same time from Plymouth, performed a similar role in liberating Jersey. Two naval officers, Surgeon Lieutenant Ronald McDonald and Sub Lieutenant R. Milne, were met by the harbourmaster (Cpt. H.J. Richmond) who escorted them to his office where they hoisted the Union Flag, before also raising it on the flagstaff of the Pomme D'Or Hotel. It appears that the first place liberated in Jersey may have been the British General Post Office Jersey repeater station. Mr Warder, a GPO lineman, had been stranded in the island during the occupation. He did not wait for the island to be liberated and went to the repeater station where he informed the German officer in charge that he was taking over the building on behalf of the British Post Office.

Sark was liberated on 10 May 1945, and the German troops in Alderney surrendered on 16 May 1945. The German prisoners of war were removed from Alderney by 20 May 1945, and its population started to return in December 1945, after clearing up had been carried out by German troops under British military supervision.

=== Aftermath ===
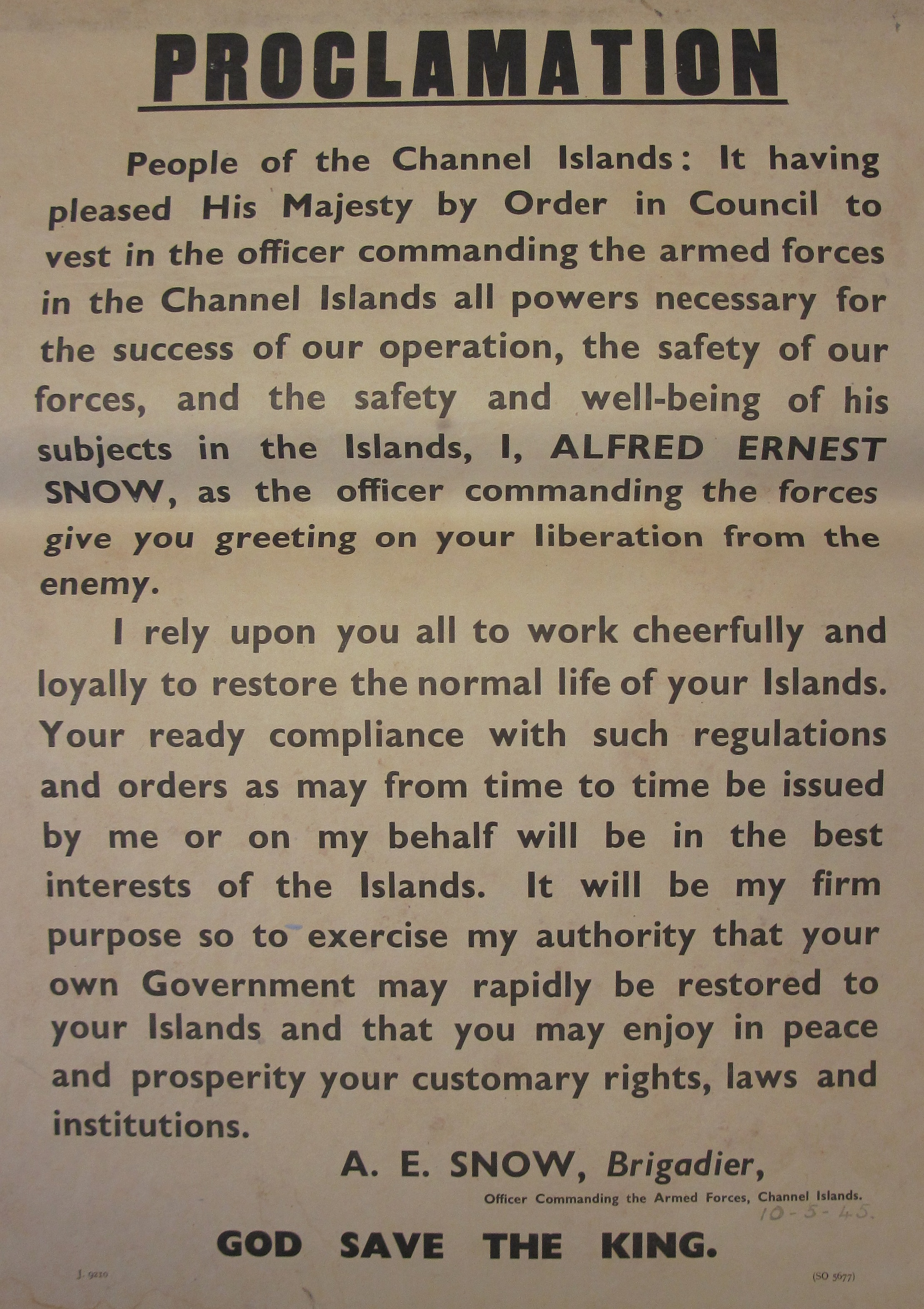
10 May 1945: The restoration of British administration is proclaimed

The main Liberation forces arrived in the islands on 12 May 1945. A Royal Proclamation read out by Brigadier Alfred Snow in both Guernsey and Jersey vested the authority of military government in him. The British Government had planned for the relief and restoration of order in the islands. Food, clothing, pots, pans and household necessities had been stockpiled so as to supply islanders immediately. It was decided that to minimise financial disruption Reichsmarks would continue in circulation until they could be exchanged for sterling.

In Sark, the Dame was left in command of the 275 German troops in the island until 17 May when they were transferred as prisoners of war to England. The UK Home Secretary, Herbert Morrison, visited Guernsey on 14 May and Jersey on 15 May and offered an explanation in person to the States in both bailiwicks as to why it had been felt in the interests of the islands not to defend them in 1940 and not to use force to liberate them after D-Day.

On 7 June the King and Queen visited Jersey and Guernsey to welcome the oldest possessions of the Crown "back to freedom".

Since the state of affairs in the islands had been largely unknown and there had been uncertainty as to the extent of resistance by the German forces, the Defence (Channel Islands) Regulations of 1944 had vested sweeping administrative powers in the military governor. As it turned out that the German surrender was entirely peaceful and orderly and civil order had been maintained, these regulations were used only for technical purposes such as reverting to Greenwich Mean Time. Each bailiwick was left to make its own regulations as necessary. The situation of retrospectively regularising legislation passed without Royal Assent had to be dealt with. Brigadier Snow signed regulations on 13 June (promulgated 16 June) to renew orders in Jersey and ordinances in Guernsey as though there had been no interruption in their technical validity. The period of military government lasted until 25 August 1945 when new Lieutenant Governors in each bailiwick were appointed.

Following the liberation of 1945, allegations of collaboration with the occupying authorities were investigated. By November 1946, the UK Home Secretary was in a position to inform the House of Commons that most of the allegations lacked substance and only 12 cases of collaboration were considered for prosecution, but the Director of Public Prosecutions had ruled out prosecutions on insufficient grounds. In particular, it was decided that there were no legal grounds for proceeding against those alleged to have informed to the occupying authorities against their fellow citizens. The only trials connected to the occupation of the Channel Islands to be conducted under the Treachery Act 1940 were against individuals from among those who had come to the islands from Britain in 1939–1940 for agricultural work. These included conscientious objectors associated with the Peace Pledge Union and people of Irish extraction. In December 1945 a list of British honours was announced to recognise a certain number of prominent islanders for services during the occupation.

In Jersey and Guernsey, laws were passed to confiscate retrospectively the financial gains made by war profiteers and black marketeers, although these measures also affected those who had made legitimate profits during the years of military occupation.

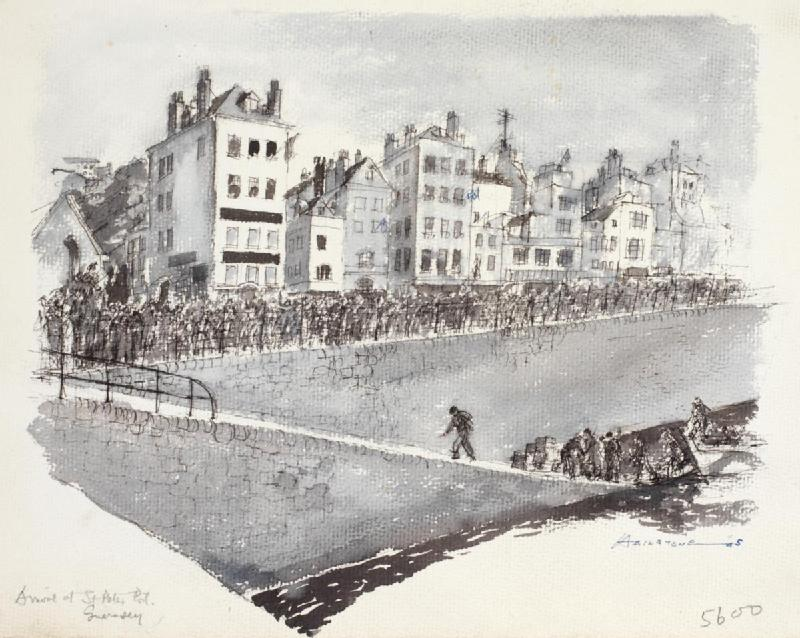
Arrival of British troops at St Peter Port, Guernsey in May 1945

Women who had fraternised with German soldiers were known as "Jerry-bags". This had aroused indignation among some citizens. In the hours following the liberation, members of the British liberating forces were obliged to intervene to prevent revenge attacks.

For two years after the liberation, Alderney was operated as a communal farm. Craftsmen were paid by their employers, whilst others were paid by the local government out of the profit from the sales of farm produce. Remaining profits were put aside to repay the British government for repairing and rebuilding the island. As a result of resentment by the local population about not being allowed to control their own land, the Home Office set up an enquiry that led to the "Government of Alderney Law 1948", which came into force on 1 January 1949. The law provided for an elected States of Alderney, a justice system and, for the first time in Alderney, the imposition of taxes. Due to the small population of Alderney, it was believed that the island could not be self-sufficient in running the airport and the harbour, as well as in providing an acceptable level of services. The taxes were therefore collected into the general Bailiwick of Guernsey revenue funds (at the same rate as Guernsey) and administered by the States of Guernsey. Guernsey became responsible for many governmental functions and services.

Particularly in Guernsey, which evacuated the majority of school-age children ahead of the occupation, the occupation weakened the indigenous culture of the island. Many felt that the children "left as Guerns and returned as English". This was particularly felt in the loss of the local dialect – children who were fluent in Guernesiais when they left, found that after five years of non-use they had lost much of the language.

The abandoned German equipment and fortifications posed a serious safety risk and there were many accidents after the occupation resulting in several deaths. Many of the bunkers, batteries and tunnels can still be seen today. Some have been restored, such as Battery Lothringen and Ho8, and are open for the general public to visit. After the occupation, the islanders used some of the fortifications for other purposes, but most were stripped out in scrap drives (and by souvenir hunters) and left abandoned. One bunker was transformed into a fish hatchery and a large tunnel complex was made into a mushroom farm.

The islands were seriously in debt, with the island governments owing over £10,000,000, having had to pay for the evacuation ships, the costs incurred by evacuees in the UK, the cost of the "occupation forces", being wages, food, accommodation and transport as well as the cost of providing domestics for the Germans, providing civilian work for islanders and needing to pay for reconstruction and compensation after the war. Taxation receipts had fallen dramatically during the war period. Finally, the now worthless Occupation Reichsmarks and RM bank deposits were converted back to Sterling at the rate of 9.36RM to £1. Part of this debt was met by a "gift" from the UK government of £3,300,000 which was used to reimburse islanders who had suffered damage and loss. In addition, the cost of maintaining the evacuees, estimated at £1,000,000 was written off by the government. As one could buy a house for £250 in the 1940s, the gift was equivalent to the value of 17,000 houses.

=== War crime trials ===
After World War II, a court-martial case was prepared against ex-SS Hauptsturmführer Max List (the former commandant of Lagers Norderney and Sylt), citing atrocities in Alderney. He did not stand trial, and is believed to have lived near Hamburg until his death in the 1980s. Unlike in the rest of Europe, German collaborators who had given information which led to the deportation of the Island's Jewish population to Belsen and Auschwitz were never punished by the British government.

== Legacy ==
- Since the end of the occupation, the anniversary of Liberation Day has been celebrated in Jersey and Guernsey on 9 May as a national holiday (see Liberation Day (Jersey)); Sark marks Liberation Day on 10 May. In Alderney there was no official local population to be liberated, so Alderney celebrates "Homecoming Day" on 15 December to commemorate the return of the evacuated population. The first shipload of evacuated citizens from Alderney returned on this day.
- The Channel Islands Occupation Society was formed in order to study and preserve the history of this period.
- Castle Cornet was presented to the people of Guernsey in 1947 by the Crown as a token of their loyalty during two world wars.
- Some German fortifications have been preserved as museums, including the Underground Hospitals built in Jersey (Hohlgangsanlage 8) and Guernsey.
- Liberation Square in Saint Helier, Jersey, is now a focal point of the town, and has a sculpture which celebrates the liberation of the island. The Liberation monument in Saint Peter Port, Guernsey, is in the form of a monumental sundial unveiled on 9 May 1995: the obelisk that acts as gnomon has 50 layers, with the top 5 sheared to represent the loss of freedom for five years during the occupation – the sundial is so constructed that on 9 May each year the shadow points to inscriptions telling the story of Liberation hour by hour.
- In Jersey the end of the occupation was also marked with a George VI penny (denominated "one-twelfth of a shilling") inscribed "Island of Jersey Liberated 1945". One million, two hundred thousand, were minted between 1949 and 1952. In 1977 it also appeared on a postage stamp. An additional 720,000 with the portrait of Elizabeth II were produceded in 1954. All mintages carry the "1945" date.
- In 1950 the States of Jersey purchased the headland at Noirmont, site of intense fortification (see Battery Lothringen), as a memorial to all Jerseymen who perished. A memorial stone was unveiled at Noirmont on 9 May 1970 to mark the 25th anniversary of Liberation.
- Saint Helier is twinned (since 2002) with Bad Wurzach, where deported Channel Islanders were interned.
- In 1966, Norman Le Brocq and 19 other islanders were awarded gold watches by the Soviet Union as a sign of gratitude for their role in the resistance movement.
- Former fugitives who had been sheltered by islanders were included among the guests at 50th anniversary celebrations of the Liberation in 1995.
- On 9 March 2010 the award of British Hero of the Holocaust was made to 25 individuals posthumously, including four Jerseymen, by the United Kingdom government in recognition of British citizens who assisted in rescuing victims of the Holocaust. The Jersey recipients were Albert Bedane, Louisa Gould, Ivy Forster and Harold Le Druillenec. It was, according to historian Freddie Cohen, the first time that the British Government recognised the heroism of islanders during the German occupation.
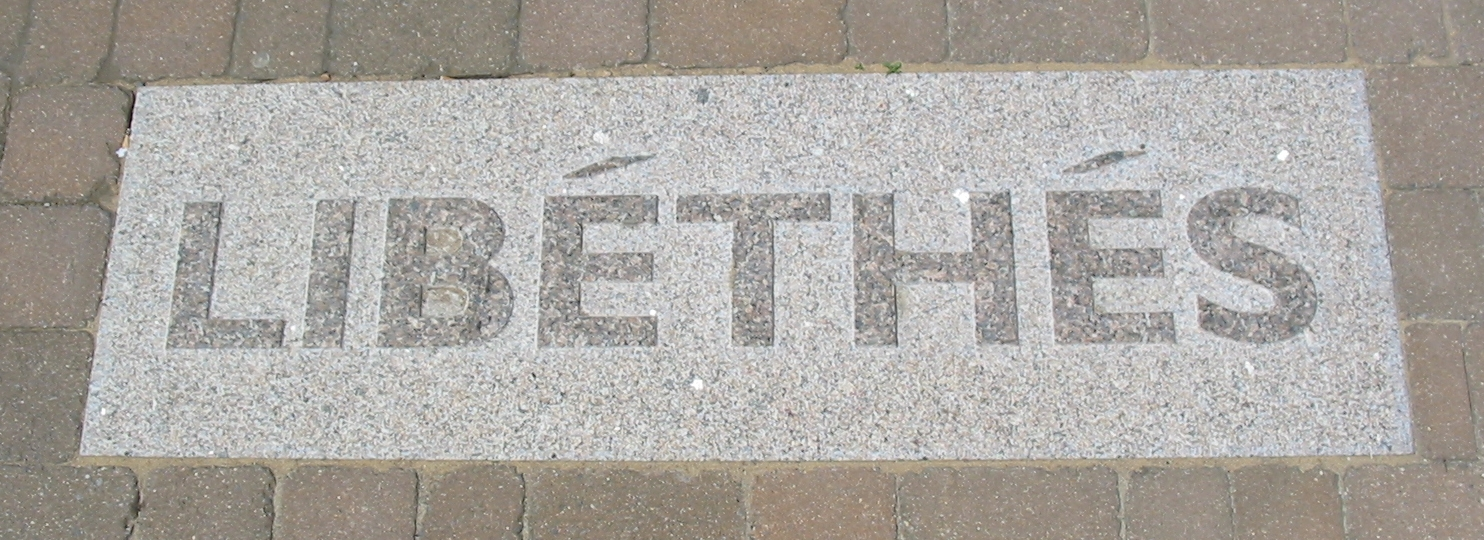
An inscription, reading "Liberated" in Jèrriais, was installed at La Pièche dé l'Av'nîn in St. Helier to mark the 60th anniversary of the Liberation in 2005

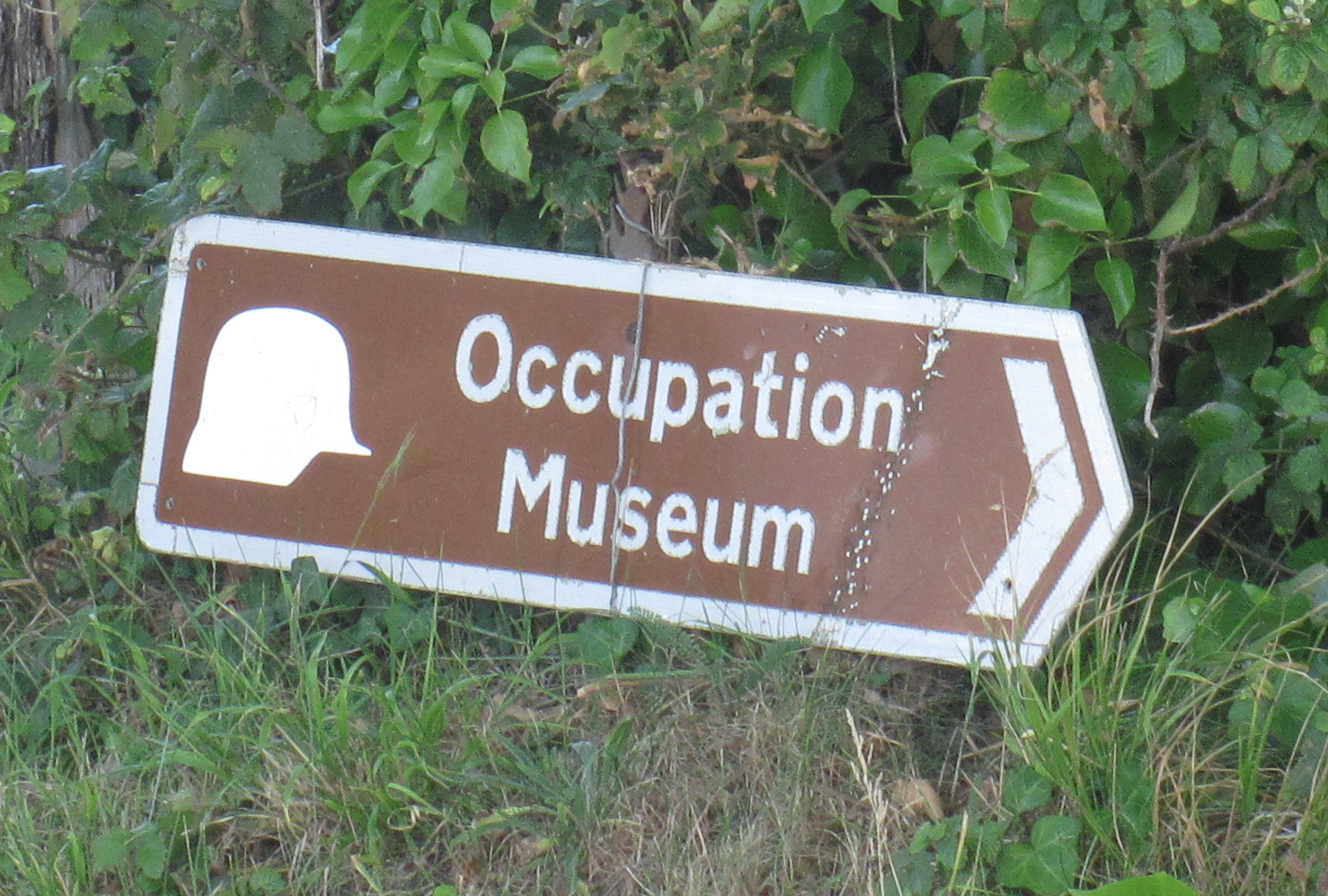
German Occupation Museum in Guernsey

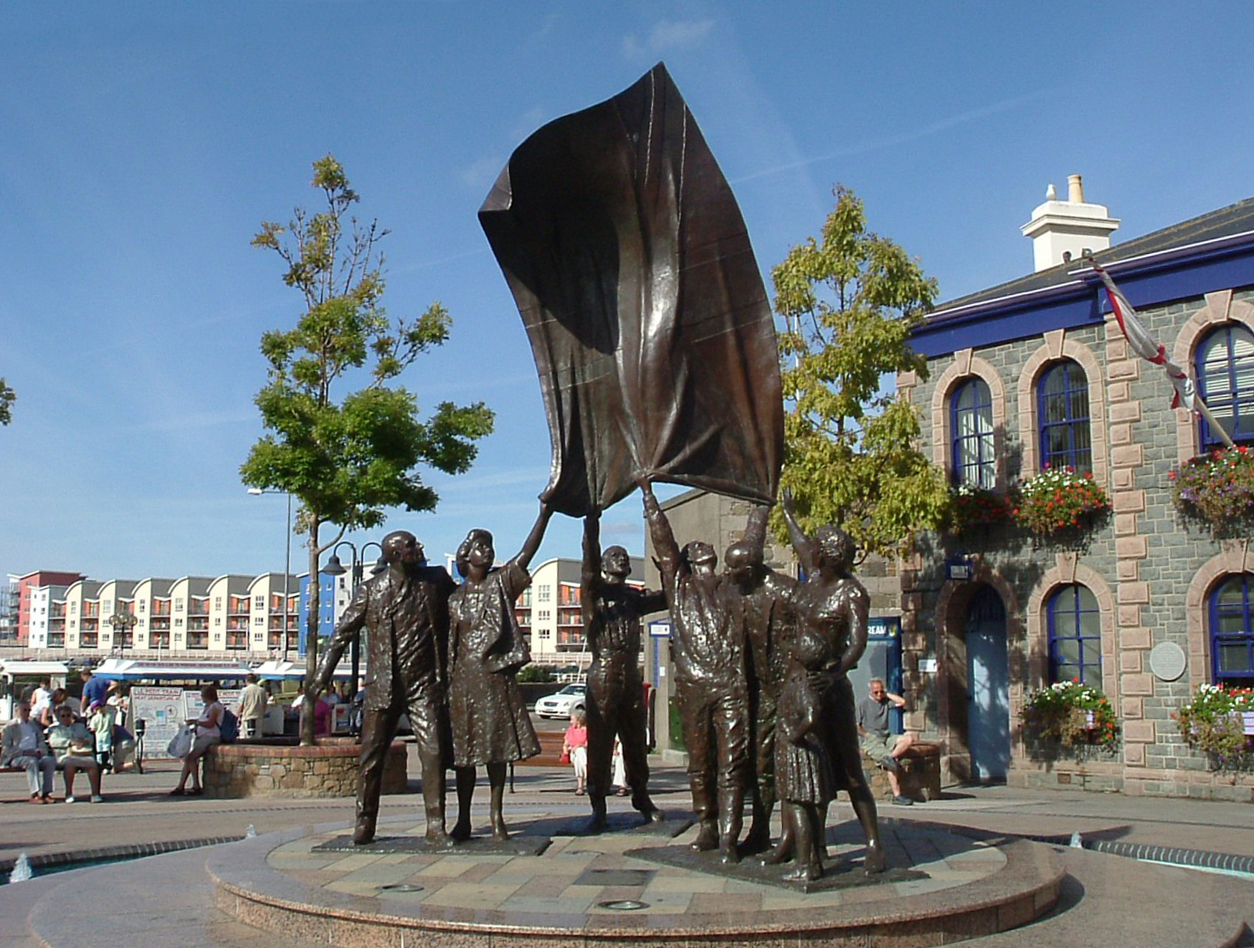
The statue in Liberation Square

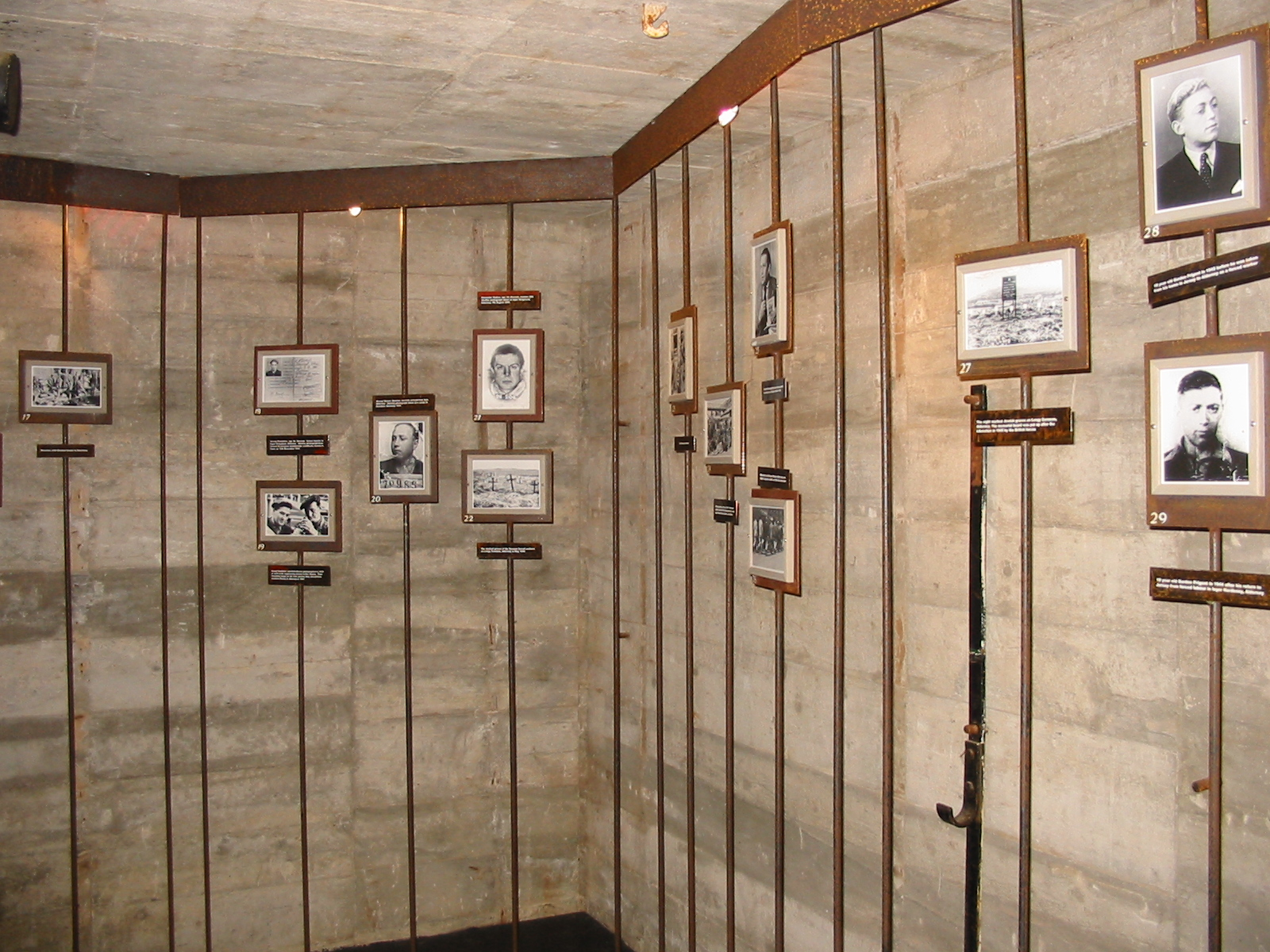
An underground command bunker, built at La Hougue Bie in Jersey, now houses an exhibition commemorating the workers from across Europe forced to build defences during the occupation

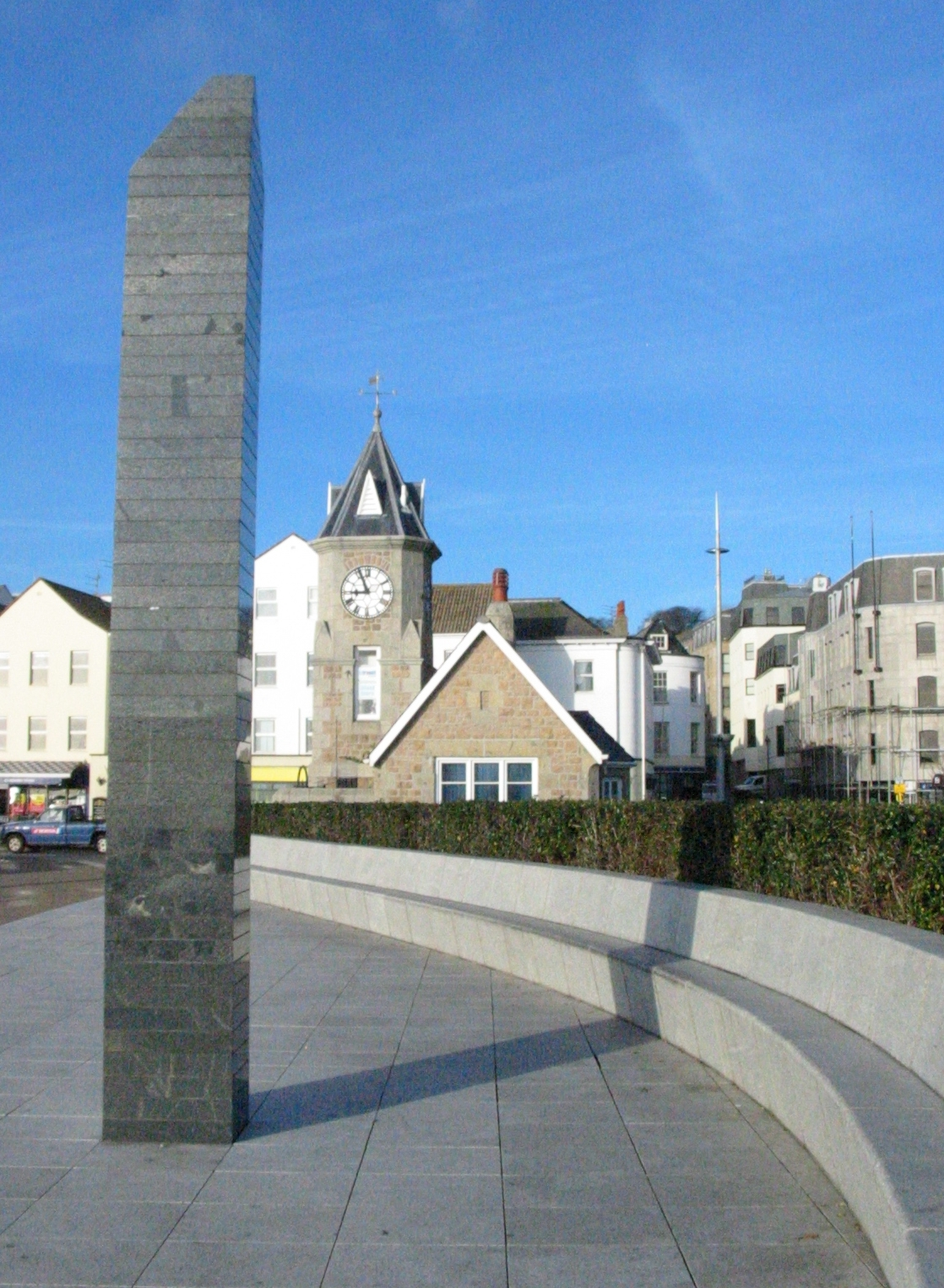
Liberation monument, La Piaeche d'la Libérâtiaon, Saint Peter Port

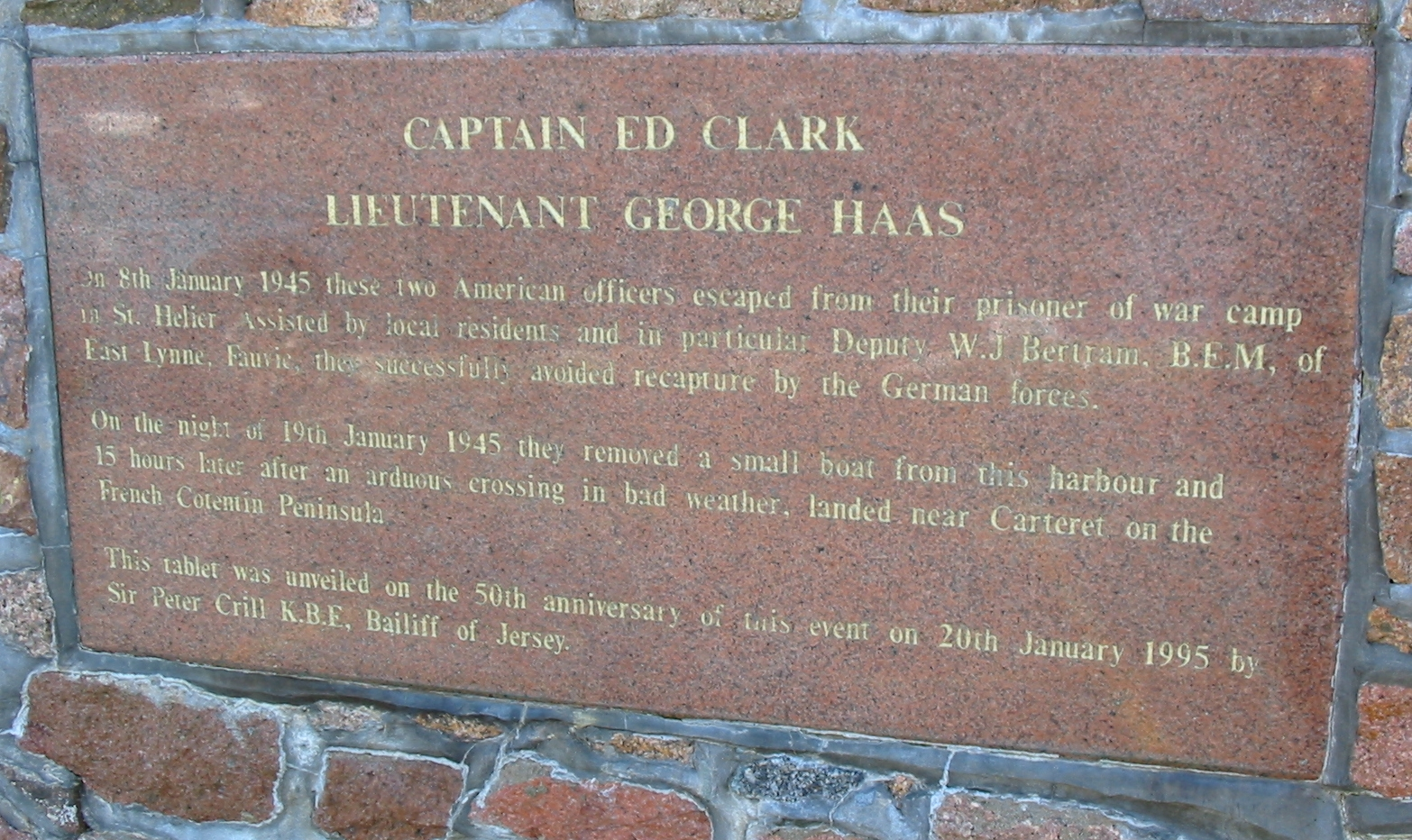
Plaque at Gorey: "Captain Ed Clark, Lieutenant George Haas: On 8 January 1945 these two American officers escaped from their prisoner of war camp in St. Helier. Assisted by local residents and in particular Deputy W.J. Bertram BEM, of East Lynne, Fauvic, they successfully avoided recapture by the German forces. On the night of 19 January 1945 they removed a small boat from this harbour and 15 hours later after an arduous crossing in bad weather, landed near Carteret on the French Cotentin Peninsula. This tablet was unveiled on the 50th anniversary of this event on 20 January 1995 by Sir Peter Crill KBE, Bailiff of Jersey."

=== Social impact ===
==== Illegitimate children ====
Evidence suggests that a significant number of children were born to German fathers during the occupation. Records show that the birth rate which had fallen at the start of World War II increased during the German Occupation. It has been reported that as many as 900 such babies may have been born in Jersey alone, though others have cited far more modest figures. At the time, under Jersey law, any child born to a married woman was automatically registered as her husband's, whilst unmarried women left the section for the father's details blank, and there were no formal legal structures surrounding adoption until 1947, so a child's German ancestry was often a matter of speculation. A government official in Jersey was reported to have said in the 1990s that "Many of them grew up with other families or may have been subsequently adopted. I think on the whole the children were assimilated," Many were placed in orphanages, whilst there were rumours that in line with the Nazi party's racial ideas some were taken to be adopted in Germany.

=== In media ===
==== Music ====
- The Liberation Jersey International Music Festival was set up in Jersey in 2008 to remember the period of occupation.
- John Ireland's Fantasy-Sonata for Clarinet and Piano (1943) was partly inspired by his experience in being evacuated from the Channel Islands in advance of the occupation.
- In her song Alderney, which appears on her album The Sea Cabinet, singer-songwriter Gwyneth Herbert tells the story of the sudden evacuation of the inhabitants of Alderney when the war broke out. She sings about the irrevocable changes introduced during the Nazi occupation of the island and their effect on the islanders.

==== Video games ====
- Occupied Guernsey appears in Mission 5 of Sniper Elite 5. Aptly named Festung Guernsey. Where the protagonist Karl Fairburne is tasked with infiltrating the Island to destroy the fictional Project Kraken Prototype: a Stealth equipped U-boat. At some point in the mission, Fairburne is also tasked with destroying Batterie Mirus after he hears it firing in the distance.

==== Television and film ====
- Several documentaries have been made about the occupation, mixing interviews with participants, both islanders and soldiers, archive footage, photos and manuscripts and modern day filming around the extensive fortifications still in place. These films include:
  - In Toni's Footsteps: The Channel Island Occupation Remembered (2002) – 52min documentary tracing the history of the Occupation following the discovery of a notebook in an attic in Guernsey belonging to a German soldier named Toni Kumpel.
  - Lover Other, a 2006 documentary about artist Claude Cahun, directed by Barbara Hammer, features the occupation prominently, as Cahun lived in Jersey at the time.
- There have also been television and film dramas set in the occupied islands:
  - Appointment with Venus, a 1951 film set on the fictional island of Armorel (based on the island of Sark).
  - Triple Cross (1966) has a passage set in Jersey in the period shortly after the German occupation commences.
  - The Blockhouse, a film starring Peter Sellers and Charles Aznavour, set in occupied France, was filmed in a German bunker and on L'Ancresse common in Guernsey in 1973.
  - The Eagle Has Landed (1976), directed by John Sturges, had a passage set in Alderney where Radl (Robert Duvall) meets Steiner (Michael Caine).
  - ITV's Enemy at the Door, set in Guernsey and shown between 1978 and 1980
  - A&E's Night of the Fox (1990), set in Jersey shortly before D-Day in 1944.
  - The 2001 film The Others starring Nicole Kidman was set in Jersey in 1945 just after the end of the occupation.
  - ITV's Island at War (2004), a drama set in the fictional Channel Island of St Gregory. It was shown by US TV network PBS as part of its Masterpiece Theatre series in 2005.
  - Another Mother's Son, a 2017 film about Louisa Gould, hiding a Russian war prisoner, starring Jenny Seagrove as Louisa Gould and Ronan Keating as Harold Le Druillenec.
  - The Guernsey Literary and Potato Peel Pie Society (2018), a film of the novel set in 1946, composed of letters written from one character to another.

==== Plays ====
- A stage play, Dame of Sark, by William Douglas-Home, is set in Sark during the German occupation, and is based on the Dame's diaries of this period. It was televised by Anglia Television in 1976, and starred Celia Johnson. It was directed by Alvin Rakoff and adapted for the small screen by David Butler.
- Another stage play, Lotty's War by Giuliano Crispini, is set in the islands during the occupation, with the story based on "unpublished diaries".

==== Novels ====
The following novels have been set in the German-occupied islands:

- Tickell, Jerrard (1951), Appointment with Venus, London: Hodder & Stoughton, set on the fictitious island of Armorel, based on Alderney
- Higgins, Jack (1970), A Game for Heroes, New York: Berkley, ISBN 0-440-13262-2
- Robinson, Derek (1977), Kramer's War, London: Hamilton, ISBN 0-241-89578-2
- Trease, Geoffrey (1987), Tomorrow Is a Stranger (London: Mammoth, ISBN 0-434-96764-5) set during the occupation of Guernsey.
- Edwards, G. B. (1981), The Book of Ebenezer Le Page (London: Hamish Hamilton, ISBN 0-241-10477-7) includes the occupation of Guernsey.
- Parkin, Lance (1996), Just War, New Doctor Who adventures series, Doctor Who Books, ISBN 0-426-20463-8
- Binding, Tim (1999), Island Madness, London: Picador, ISBN 0-330-35046-3
- Link, Charlotte (2000), Die Rosenzüchterin [The Rose Breeder], condensed ed., Köln: BMG-Wort, ISBN 3-89830-125-7
- Walters, Guy (2005), The Occupation, London: Headline, ISBN 0-7553-2066-2
- Shaffer, Mary Ann and Barrows, Annie (2008), The Guernsey Literary and Potato Peel Pie Society, New York: The Dial Press, ISBN 978-0-385-34099-1
- Cone, Libby (2009), War on the Margins, London: Duckworth, ISBN 978-0-7156-3876-7
- Andrews, Dina (2011), Tears in the Sand, Trafford, ISBN 978-1-4269-7006-1
- Horlock, Mary (2011), The Book of Lies, Canongate, ISBN 978-1-84767-885-0
- Lea, Caroline (2016), When The Sky Fell Apart, Text Publishing Company, ISBN 978-1-9252-4074-0
- Hanley, John F (2012), Against The Tide, Matador, ISBN 978-1-78088-298-7
- Hanley, John F (2013), The Last Boat, Matador, ISBN 978-1-78306-047-4
- Hanley, John F (2015), Diamonds For The Wolf, Amazon, ISBN 978-1-51711-409-1

==== Journal ====
- Bachmann, K M (1972), The Prey of an Eagle, Guernsey: Burbridge. A personal record of family life during the German Occupation of Guernsey, 1940–1945.

== See also ==
- Aviation accidents and incidents in the Channel Islands in the 1940s
- German Fortifications in Jersey
- Fort Hommet 10.5 cm Coastal Defence Gun Casement Bunker
- Henri Gonay, Belgian airman killed in Jersey, 1944
- Military history of France during World War II
- Neuengamme concentration camp subcamp list
- Sark during the German occupation of the Channel Islands
- Walker Collection: A collection of philatelic material in the British Library relating to the occupation.
