= Liberation of the German-occupied Channel Islands =

May 1945 British liberation of the Crown Dependencies

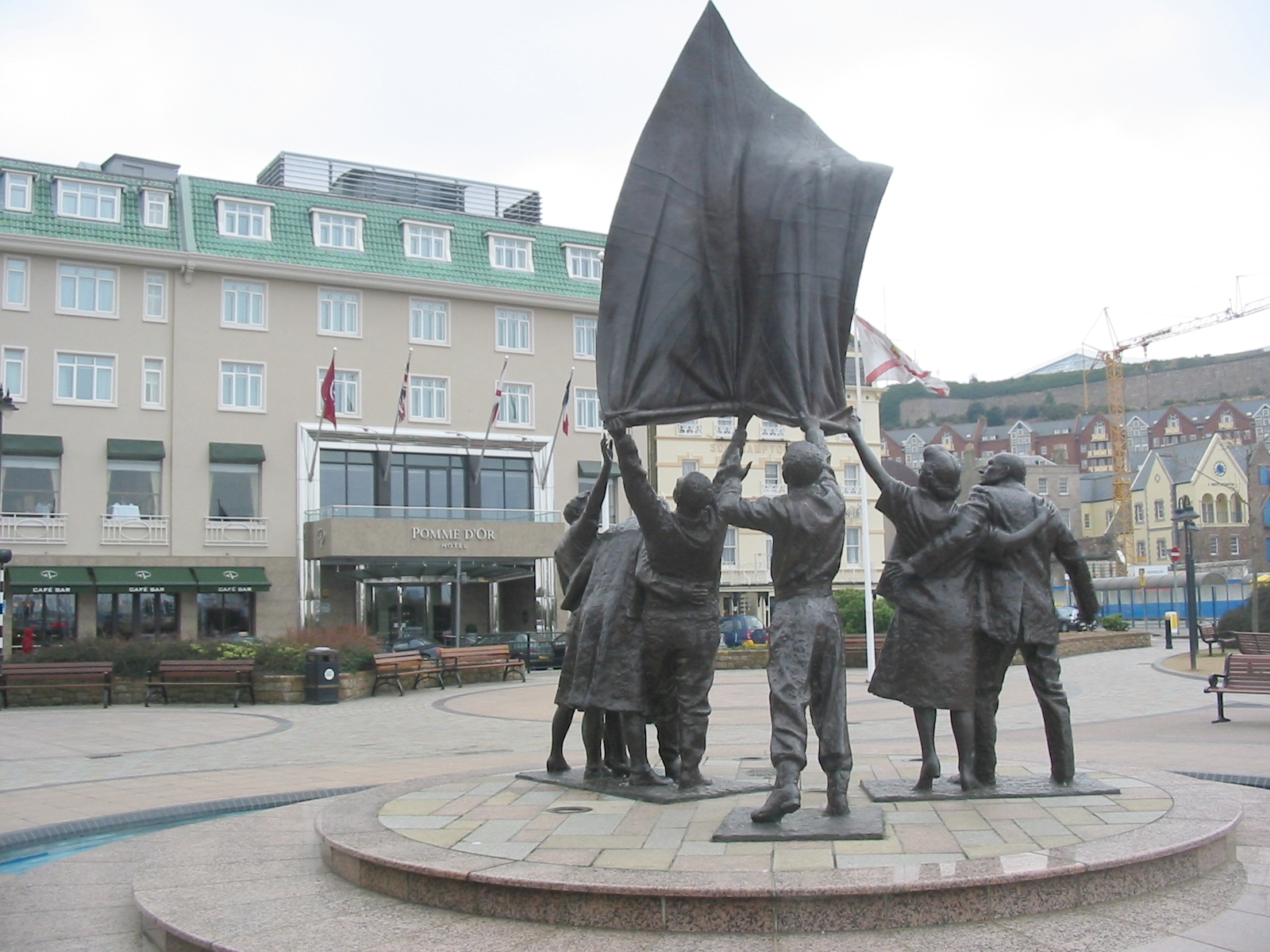
Liberation sculpture in front of Pomme d'Or Hotel, Jersey

The Channel Islands, Crown Dependencies of the United Kingdom, were occupied during the Second World War by Nazi Germany, from 30 June 1940 until May 1945. They were liberated by British forces following the general German surrender.

Considered not defendable by the Government of the United Kingdom in 1940, the islands were demilitarised and some civilians were given the opportunity to evacuate to England before German forces arrived.

The island leaders and some civil servants were asked to stay in their posts to look after the civilians in their care. Over 41,101 civilians remained on Jersey, 24,429 on Guernsey and 470 on Sark. Alderney had just 18.

Apart from undertaking a few commando raids, the islands were ignored by the British government until June 1944 when additional attacks on German shipping and radar units took place. To avoid starvation of civilians, the British government allowed Red Cross parcels to be sent to the islands during the winter of 1944–45. Liberation would have to wait until the end of the war in Europe in 1945.

== Early planning ==
In his role with Combined Operations, Lord Mountbatten was responsible for planning commando raids, from raids involving a handful of men up to the August 1942 Dieppe Raid which involved over 10,000. It was proposed in 1943, under the code name Operation Constellation, to carry out an assault on the three main islands of Jersey, Guernsey and Alderney, where 40,000 Wehrmacht troops were well dug in. Mountbatten commented:

Each island is a veritable fortress, the assault against which cannot be contemplated unless the defences are neutralised, or reduced to a very considerable extent by prior action. The proposal was eventually scuttled after it was felt that in order to dislodge the occupiers, naval and air units would need to smash the defences, resulting in massive civilian casualties.

Planning for the liberation of the Channel Islands began with Operation Rankin, prepared in late 1943. It looked at three possibilities:

- Case A – Liberation before the liberation of France; this concluded that a small attack might work if German morale was low and most German forces had left the islands.
- Case B – To occupy the islands if they were evacuated by the Germans
- Case C – The complete unconditional surrender of all German forces

Only Case C was considered likely at the time, and a directive dated 10 November 1943 was issued by the Chief of Staff, Supreme Allied Commander (COSSAC) which resulted in a Joint Plan for Operation Rankin C.

Naval forces would be based on whatever was available at the time; merchant shipping would be needed to transport three months' supply of food and medicines, as would small craft for landing supplies, bicycles for transport and signalling equipment. Just 725 officers and men were considered adequate.

=== Military intelligence ===
In 1943, military intelligence on the Channel Islands was severely lacking. Additional aerial photographs needed to be taken and interpreted. There were no Allied-controlled radio transmitters in the islands, so communications to discover what was actually happening in the islands were almost non-existent.

German troops were estimated as 23,800, with one artillery and three infantry regiments within 319th Infantry Division. Surrender would be unlikely without a fall in morale and/or starvation once isolated.

Allowing for the 2,000-3,000 British civilians who had been deported to camps in Germany in 1942–3, civilian numbers were estimated at 65,000 with 42,000 in Jersey, 23,000 in Guernsey and 355 in Sark.

Aerial photographs were taken and the few escaped civilians from the islands were interviewed.

== Detailed planning ==
Early in 1944 Brigadier Alfred Ernest Snow was appointed to command Task Force 135, the code name given to the liberation task force. Snow was 46 years old and had served in India and Burma between the wars, he was awarded an OBE when a Major with the BEF in June 1940. A small HQ structure was created to look into the planning.

On 10 May 1944 Supreme Headquarters Allied Expeditionary Force, (SHAEF) reported to Southern Command that in the event it became necessary to capture the Channel Islands, this would be undertaken by 21st Army Group, after which Southern Command would take over; and Rankin C should be reviewed accordingly. Shipping would be available after 15 July, but no troops. Southern Command replied on 22 June 1944, after the Normandy D-Day landings, that Rankin C could be amended to suit either the German evacuation of the islands or the German surrender on the islands. Alderney was to be bypassed as there were not believed to be any civilians there.

By August, it was decided that only Rankin C would be applicable, and Headquarters 115 Brigade provided the nucleus of the HQ for Task Force 135. The code name was changed to Operation Nestegg on 11 August 1944. Plymouth was chosen as the embarkation port and the planners of Task Force 135 moved their HQ from the New Forest to Cornwall.

In August 1944, the German Foreign Ministry made an offer to Britain, through the Swiss Red Cross, that would see the release and evacuation of all Channel Island civilians except for men of military age. This was not a possibility that the British had envisaged. The British considered the offer, but a memorandum from Winston Churchill said: "Let 'em starve. They can rot at their leisure". It is not clear whether Churchill meant the Germans, or the civilians. The German offer was rejected.

Not knowing when the force would be needed, a code word W-Day or warning day when the operation was given the go ahead by SHAEF was established and a timetable from then, W+1, W+2 etc. was established until C-Day or commencement day, the first landing day, with C+1, C+2 etc. for follow up days.

It was decided to involve a number of Channel Island people in the planning, as their local knowledge would be invaluable. The interrogation of islanders who managed to escape the islands by boat, especially those in 1944, provided much needed intelligence.

Needing to land in both Jersey and Guernsey on the same day involved additional shipping and men; three battalions each of 700 men, plus engineers, were now needed. Suitable beaches for landings, such as St Aubin's Bay in Jersey and L'Ancresse in Guernsey, were selected. Unloading in an area with a 10-metre (33-foot) rise and fall of the tide had to be planned. Surrender terms were drafted. Prisoner of war facilities would be needed. The airports would be opened for transport planes to land.

Administrative tasks would be given to No 20 Civil Affairs Unit, including bringing 200 tons of food, clothing and medicines in on C-Day. Everything the islands needed, from pots and pans to 1.1 million sheets of toilet paper, were sourced. The British Government gave the force commander authority under the Emergency Powers (Defence) Act 1939 to make regulations; any new laws passed by the civil governments in the islands would need Brigadier Snow's approval.

Civilians would not be allowed to leave the islands without a permit. British currency would be provided, with £1,000,000 in notes and coins brought to the islands to enable people to exchange Reichsmarks back into sterling. A distribution of free "treats" including tobacco, chocolate and tea was planned.

Longer-term plans were made to remove POWs, mines and weapons and to bring in enough food to provide 2,750 calories a day for three months for the civilians as well as fuel and goods, including 15 months worth of clothing rations which would be made available to purchase through the island shops.

There was no rush to liberate the islands. The cut-off Germans there were effectively prisoners of war who did not even have to be guarded. Because of the shortage of infantry, troops allocated to Task Force 135 were being sent to join the main army fighting in Europe.

=== Attempts at an early surrender ===
During September 1944, British aircraft dropped leaflets printed in German over the islands almost every night; on 22 September an unarmed air-sea rescue high speed launch HSL-2632 travelled from France to a point near St Martin's Point off Guernsey. Arriving late and not finding any German ship to meet them, they proceeded to St Peter Port harbour under a white flag, met by E-boat S-112 which was not aware of the proposed meeting. A message was sent ashore but the opportunity for a discussion was refused. The HSL-2632 sailed off to England, being fired at by an 8.8 cm battery on Alderney who were not aware of the attempted peace mission.

Around this time the Allies agreed to allow the International Committee of the Red Cross (ICRC) to send the ship Vega with Red Cross parcels to the islands to reduce the risk of starvation. The first ship would sail in mid December.

A few more leaflet dropping missions were undertaken, with no visible sign of success, possibly because it was impossible for the soldiers, trapped on an island, to desert.

=== Exercise Merlin ===
In December 1944 a rehearsal for Nestegg from W-Day to C+3 was undertaken. 6,100 troops were gathered and briefed, supplies loaded onto vehicles and ships, vehicles loaded onto landing ships and men were boarded. The Jersey force with 200 vehicles and 804 tons of supplies was landed at Paignton, the Guernsey force with 340 vehicles and 800 tons landed at Brixham. Realism continued with a few fanatic "enemy", some in plain clothes, and civilian women favouring Germany were met onshore. There were 12 minor injuries and a barn was damaged by a bulldozer. Lessons were learnt, such as the discovery of a shortage of cooks, and applied to modify the Nestegg plans.

A second exercise in late February 1945 was undertaken with no problems, as was street fighting in bombed out streets in Plymouth. A third exercise, scheduled for mid May, was cancelled.

== Task Force 135 ==
The roughly 6,000 military and the naval forces would include the following:

- 614, 618 and 620 Regiments, Royal Artillery
- 411 Independent heavy Anti-Aircraft Battery
- No 20 Civil Affairs Unit
- Assorted Royal Engineer companies
- Assorted Royal Signals sections
- Royal Army Service Corps units
- 209 Field Ambulance
- 135 Field Ordnance

- REME, Medical, Postal, Provost, Pioneer, Intelligence, Pay, Catering, PoW, DCLI band, Royal Marines, RAF, and Public Relations companies or sections
- Assorted ships from the British, American, Canadian, Polish, Belgian and Dutch Navies.

== W-Days ==
On 30 April 1945, when Adolf Hitler committed suicide, German flags in the Channel Islands were flown at half mast and Union Jack flags were being sold openly in the islands. The Bailiff in Jersey appealed for calm.

Coat of Arms of Jersey

Plan Prophet, the landing in Guernsey and plan Moslem in Jersey, were given the “stand to” warning on 3 May 1945, making 4 May W-Day. Formation badges were issued, the shield was based on the three leopards of Jersey and Guernsey coat of arms as used by Edward I of England and stencil formation signs were painted on the vehicles. Equipment and stores started to move from depots as far away as Liverpool. W+1, W+2 and W+3 came and went. On W+4, 8 May 1945, the day Europe celebrated the end of war in Europe, vehicles were being loaded. Press men came aboard on W+5 just before the leading ships sailed.

In the islands of Guernsey, Jersey and Sark the anticipation of the end of the war in Europe was at fever pitch; the authorities were trying hard to suppress the civilians' urge to hang out patriotic flags, as they did not want to provoke German retaliation. The Germans were very nervous about their future.

On 7 May the Bailiff of Jersey went to the prison, and at his request 30 "political prisoners" were released. Also on W+3 a message was transmitted by Southern Command in clear to the German commander in the Channel Islands telling them that ships would arrive shortly to accept their surrender. The German reply was that they only took orders from German command.

Everything changed on 8 May when the Germans released all British, French and American prisoners of war and all German prisoners held in the islands. Bunting and flags were put up in the streets, radios, which had been banned for years upon pain of imprisonment, were produced in public, connected to loudspeakers. and tuned in to the speech given by Winston Churchill at 3pm where they heard him say:

Hostilities will end officially at one minute after midnight tonight, but in the interests of saving lives the cease fire began yesterday to be sounded all along the front, and our dear Channel Islands are also to be freed today.

The crowds were cheering and jubilant, the island newspapers had published that peace had been declared, Allied flags and bunting flew everywhere, however the British landing force was not present.

Very late on 7 May, Southern Command had tried again by radio. The German commander replied to the British radio message confirming the British ships would not be fired upon. Two destroyers, HMS Beagle escorting HMS Bulldog, sailed at 09.45 on 8 May with an advance party, codename Omelette.

Arriving off the south west coast of Guernsey, four miles (6.4 kilometres) south of Les Hanois Lighthouse at 14.00 hrs, the ships were met by a German minesweeper. A junior German officer came aboard HMS Bulldog telling the assembled British that he was only empowered to negotiate surrender terms, not to sign them. Details of the surrender terms were handed to the German and he departed, as did the British ships as they would not be given safe conduct to remain as the general ceasefire would operate only from midnight.

=== W-Day +5 (9 May) ===
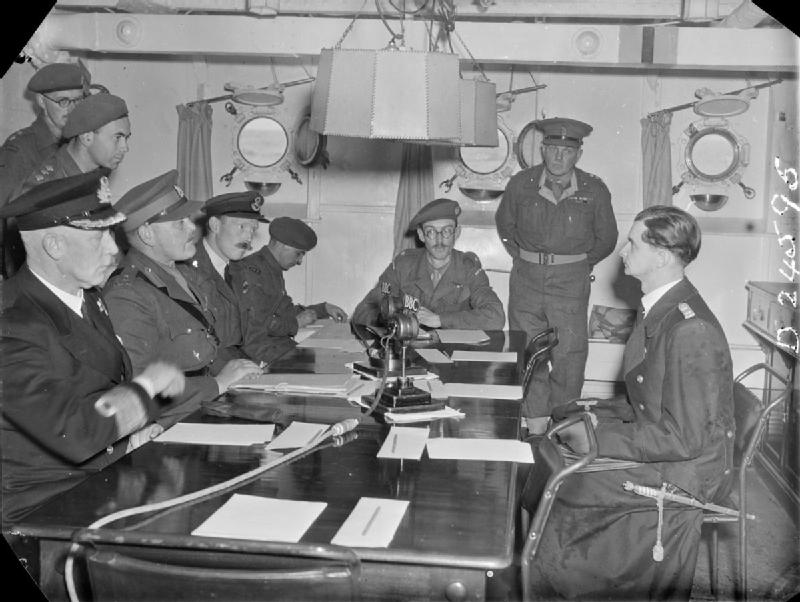
Channel Islands Liberated- the End of German Occupation, Channel Islands, 1945 D24595

Receiving a message from the Germans agreeing to a meeting at midnight on 8–9 May, the ships returned to the same south west coast location off Guernsey and a German minesweeper M4613 came out to meet HMS Bulldog. The German second in command, Generalmajor Siegfried Heine, came aboard and went to the wardroom. When asked if he would accept unconditional surrender he replied Ja. The ships sailed slowly around the coast to St Peter Port.

Eight copies of the formal terms of surrender were signed on the quarterdeck using a rum barrel as a table, with civility and polite bows. At 07.15 hrs HMS Bulldog with the help of a German pilot, anchored off St Peter Port.

All German flags would be lowered and German ships would be sent out to pick up British troops and land them on shore. The initial Omelette force of four officers and 21 men, including four Guernseymen, landed at 07.50 hrs to be greeted by a town decorated in red, white and blue and thousands of cheering malnourished islanders singing, amongst other patriotic songs, "Sarnia Cherie". Lt-Col Stoneman set up his HQ in the Royal Hotel. At 11.00 hrs Stoneman and his small party went to the Royal Court house where they met the Bailiff of Guernsey, Victor Carey and jurats. A Union Flag was ceremoniously hoisted.

Brigadier Snow had transferred to HMS Beagle and sailed on to Jersey, leaving HMS Bulldog anchored off St Peter Port, where a local fishing boat paid them a visit, swapping with the naval crew German souvenirs for chocolate and cigarettes.

HMS Beagle arrived at St Helier on Jersey at 10.00 hrs with another set of surrender documents to be signed. It had been done this way in case a German officer did not have authority over both islands and because of the rivalry between the two islands. Two naval officers, Surgeon Lieutenant Ronald McDonald and Sub Lieutenant R. Milne, were met by the harbourmaster who escorted them to his office where they hoisted the Union Flag out a window, before also raising it on the flagstaff of the Pomme d'Or Hotel.

The Bailiff of Jersey Alexander Coutanche had already received a phone call from the British HQ in Guernsey when at 10.00 hrs HMS Beagle arrived and radioed for a German ship to meet them. A Kriegsmarine tug, FK01 sailed out, but without the Jersey commander on board. It was noon before Generalmajor Rudolf Wulf with the Bailiff of Jersey sailed out to HMS Beagle. After the Germans had signed the surrender documents at 14.00 hrs and had lunch, the civilians returned with pockets full of bars of soap and tobacco to Jersey, overtaken en route by a launch carrying the first Jersey Omelette troops, five signallers.

The RAF made an appearance, with flypasts by Mosquitos at 13.00 hrs. The Jersey population had been told to be in Royal Square at 2pm, however the whole event was delayed. It was 14.30 hrs before the first group of fewer than 30 Omelette men, including Jersey born men, landed and marched to the Pomme d’Or Hotel where a massive crowd awaited them, Jersey girls being free with kisses and everybody exuberant, which slowed the troops to 100 yards an hour. The German swastika flag was removed and a Union Flag was draped from a balcony of the hotel which became the Task Force 135 HQ under Lt-Col Robinson, who made a speech to the crowd.

The Germans were told to remove all troops from a circle of one mile (1.6 kilometres) around the centre of St Helier, except for the hospital and guards on ammunition and weapon dumps. The flag flying over Fort Regent changed to the Union Flag at 17.00 hrs. British soldiers handed sweets to children and commented on how thin the islanders looked.

A large landing craft LCI(L)-130, carrying 200 additional Jersey Omelette personnel, including six Jersey men, arrived at 17.00 hrs just as another fly past, this time by RCAF Mustangs crossed St Helier. They scattered into small groups to take command of the town.

The Red Cross ship, SS Vega was in the harbour having recently arrived with the latest supply of Red Cross parcels for the starving civilians.

The main part of the Guernsey Omelette, comprising 160 men, landed from a landing craft, LCI-103 at 14.15 hrs. Many more people had come to the town to see them, church bells were ringing and the British soldiers were given flowers. The Germans had started clearing obstructions from the airport and disconnected sea minefields. Twenty-two German officers were allocated to work at the British HQ to assist. Germans were appointed as drivers and took British soldiers in their cars to various locations, such as the airport.

Both islands were told the main force would arrive on C+3, Saturday 12 May when there would be fitting ceremonial events in the presence of Brigadier Snow.

HMS Beagle sailed back to Guernsey, leaving HMS Cosby anchored off St Helier. HMS Beagle anchored off St Peter Port and HMS Bulldog sailed with Brigadier Snow back to Plymouth.

During the afternoon and evening of 9 May, on both islands, several young women were roughly handled by local men and women who had previously seen them in the company of German soldiers, as were other people who were considered quislings. A few people, including Germans, were arrested. There were a few injuries, mainly caused by children playing with German guns.

It appears that the first place liberated in Jersey may have been the British General Post Office Jersey repeater station. Mr Warder, a GPO lineman, had been stranded in the island during the occupation. He did not wait for the island to be liberated and went to the repeater station where he informed the German officer in charge that he was taking over the building on behalf of the British Post Office.

=== W-Day +6 (10 May) ===
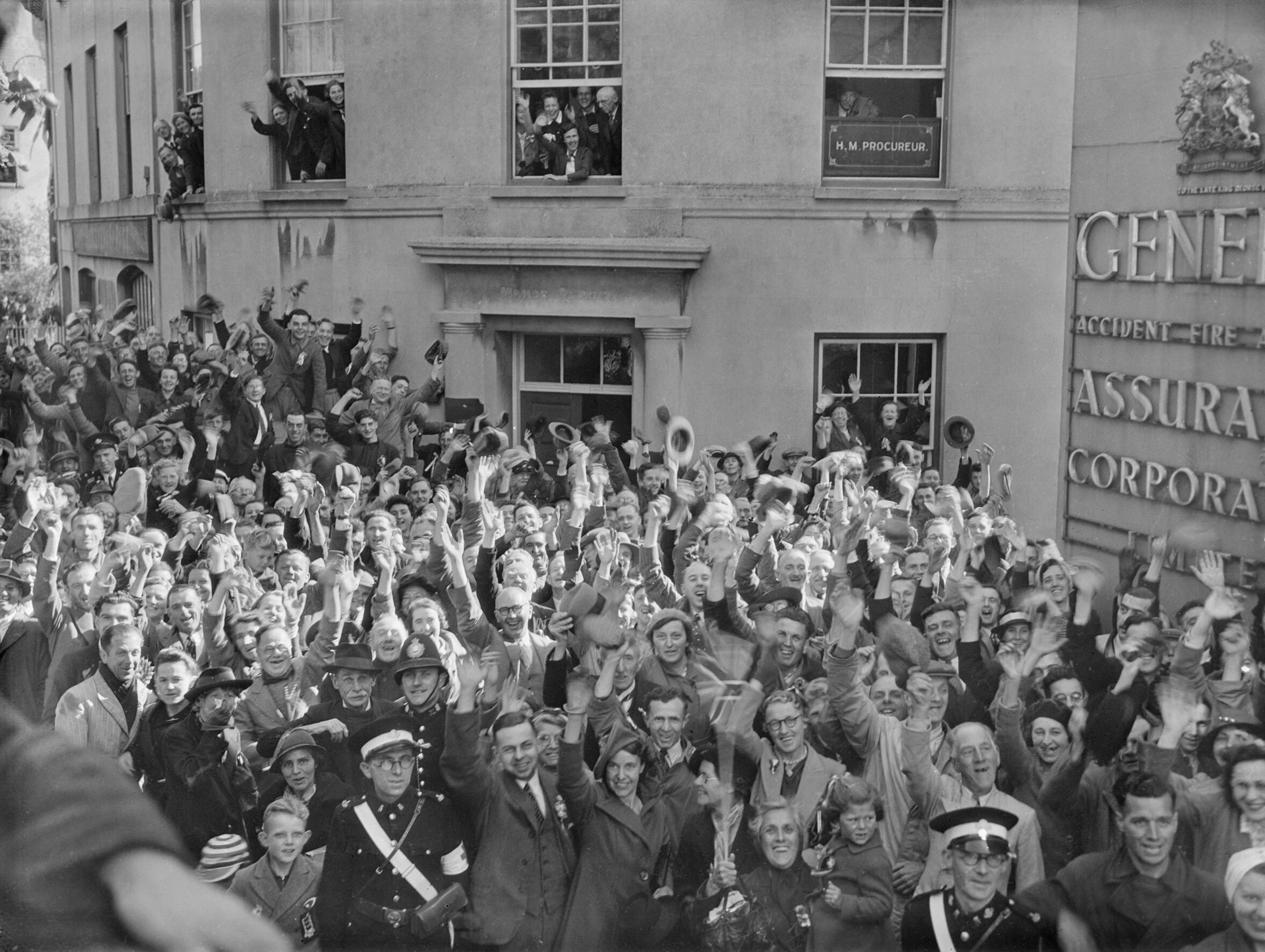
Crowds of people gathered outside the General Assurance Corporation building in St Peter Port, Guernsey to welcome the British Task Force sent to liberate the island from German occupation, 10 May 1945. D24590

Embarkation of vehicles, equipment and men were being completed, and small coasters carrying coal and fuel joined the assembling fleet. Ten Landing Ship, Tank (LSTs) were in the first lift, one British and three American for Jersey, with one British and five American for Guernsey. Troops boarded Landing Ship, infantry (LSI); each LSI carried six Landing Craft Infantry (LCI) to take the troops ashore.

On Jersey, Robinson with a guard of honour of British troops went for a march around the town, gathering a crowd as they progressed until arriving in Royal Square. They met the Bailiff and the Union Flag was symbolically raised, with a Boys' Brigade band playing "God Save the King". That afternoon a ceremony was held on the SS Vega where the Red Cross officials, captain and crew were thanked and presented with gifts. In the evening a variety show was put on at the Opera House.

Minesweepers were busy sweeping clear channels across the English Channel and into Bailiwick waters; no mines were found.

The size of the German garrisons was clarified: they totalled 26,909, with Jersey having 11,671, Guernsey 11,755, Alderney 3,202 and Sark 281.

Allied prisoners of war held in the islands had already been released by the Germans and joined in the partying; they were gathered together for processing for return to England. Anglican and Roman Catholic services were held to mark the liberation.

There were several assaults against girls accused of being too friendly with Germans, with some men as well as police and British soldiers standing up to the mobs to protect the girls. Others wisely stayed out of sight. One Jersey woman and her son were locked up for their own protection, and were still in jail in March 1946.

The liberation of Sark, Operation Marble, took place on this date. It occurred earlier than planned due to reports of unrest amongst the Germans when a large fire was sighted and nobody was answering the telephone. At 16.00 hrs the German ship FK04 was taken and sailed across to the island with a small number of British troops. Landing safely, they were met by Sibyl Hathaway, the Dame of Sark, who explained the bonfire was a celebration. Meeting the German commander at his headquarters, surrender documents were signed at Rosebud Cottage, after which the Germans were told to surrender weapons and start removing mines. The ship returned to Guernsey at 21.00 hrs leaving the Dame of Sark in charge of the 275 German soldiers until 17 May when most were removed.

=== W-Day +7 (11 May) ===
On the islands, work was under way to clear certain beaches and slipways of obstacles, mines and barriers to make them ready for the landing craft expected next day.

The public were warned to take great care not to pillage, loot, enter minefields, or pick up strange objects or weapons, and to stay away from the proposed landing areas so that the vehicles coming ashore could safely land with men and supplies.

In Jersey, the Bailiff, Jurats and States officials met in the Royal Court with the senior British officers. The proceedings were conducted in French as normal, and the Orders of His Majesty in Council giving emergency powers were presented and approved and lodged au Greffe, making them law. Simultaneous services of thanksgiving were held in nine Methodist churches, preparations for which had begun a year earlier.

Reports regarding the situation in the islands were quickly composed, covering fuel, food, health, hospital supplies, needs for evacuation to England, and postal services, to determine if any changes were necessary to the Nestegg plan. Members of the German Geheime Feldpolizei were rounded up.

A boat was sent to Sark to collect the Dame of Sark and she was entertained to lunch on HMS Beagle.

The Guernsey first lift group, codename Agent, comprising 13 ships, assembled and sailed at 15.45 hrs from Plymouth under the escort of six ships and a Liberator aircraft.

The Jersey group codenamed Booty followed 15 minutes later, escorted by a further six ships, mainly Canadian destroyers. All ships were ordered to keep a distance of 27,000 yards (25 km; 13 nmi) from Alderney as it was not known if they had surrendered.

== C-Day (W-Day +8) (12 May) ==
The ships comprising Booty anchored off St Helier at 07.00 hrs, Agent off St Peter Port at 07.15 hrs. German troops were confined to barracks.

Guernsey's Operation Prophet envisaged landings at L’Ancresse bay and in St Peter Port. At 08.30 the first LCA, docked on Baker Red the Castle Cornet breakwater, their objective to secure Castle Cornet, a fortified German strongpoint, commanding the harbour approaches. Thereafter a stream of LCAs came ashore to Baker Green, the White Rock pier and Baker Red; their jobs were to secure the German defences in the harbour area. There were not many civilians to be seen, but within a short time, people began flocking into town, shouting and cheering. British military police kept them clear of the harbour piers.

People were astonished to see LST-516 enter the harbour at 09.00 hrs and nose between the Old Harbour entrance, to await the fall of the tide. Troops moved through the town securing buildings that had been German HQs, including the Crown Hotel, the Grange Lodge and telephone exchanges.

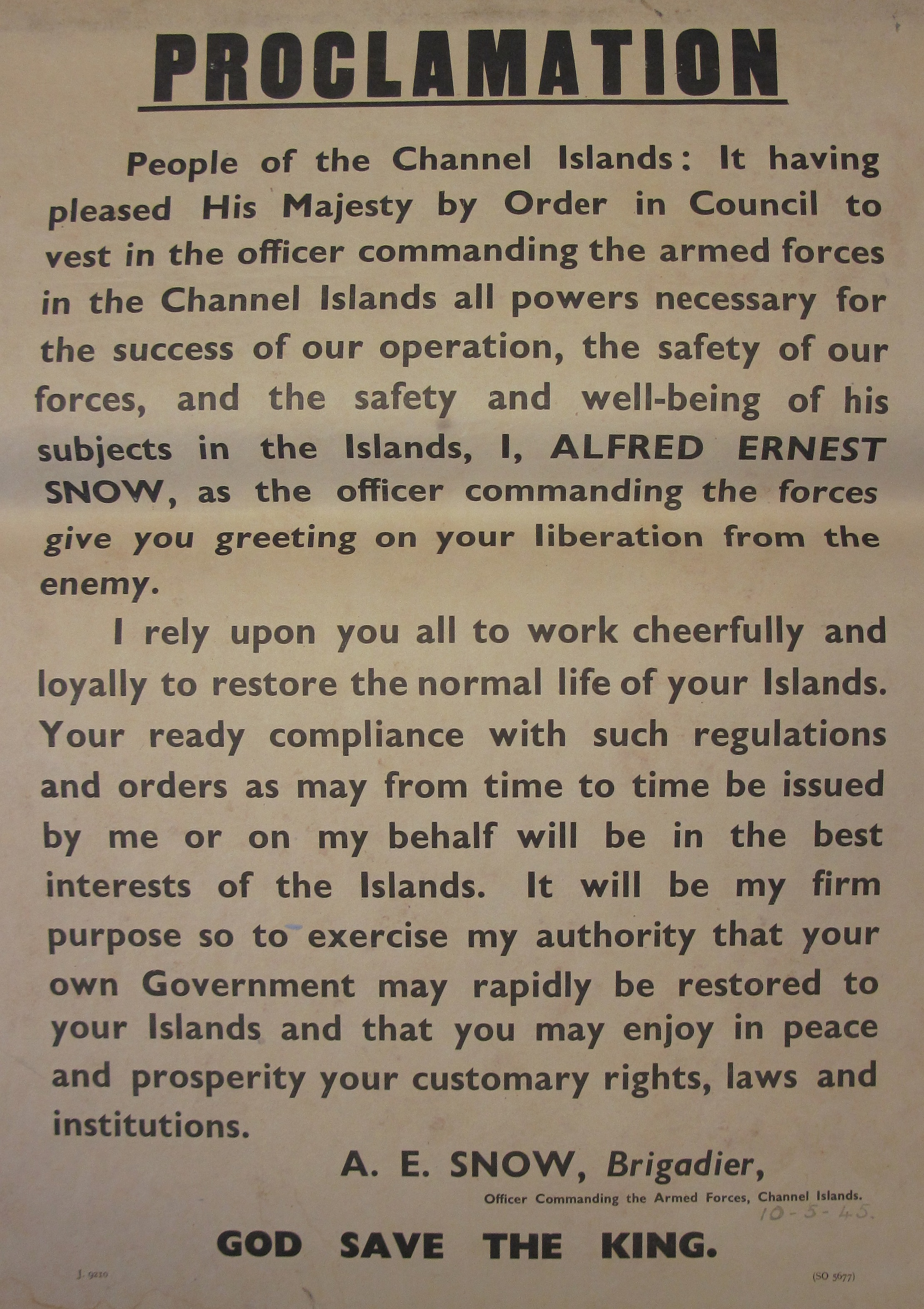
Proclamation Liberation Channel Islands 1945 Snow

Phase III started at 09.20 hrs landing a further 257 men, followed at 09.40 hrs with another load of men, including MI5 officers, the press, signals and engineers. The soldiers landing were ignoring the civilians and concentrating on the set military objectives, moving further away from the town, securing Fort George, the waterworks at Kings Mills and L’Ancresse common, bicycles helping troops to move quickly.

Yet another official surrender took place at 11.00 hrs when Brigadier Snow accepted the formal surrender of the German garrison at the Crown Hotel. Meanwhile, at L’Ancresse bay access to the beach was achieved. In town the audience was amazed to see DUKW amphibious vehicles swim ashore and drive onto the land, then at 13.40 the doors of LST-516 swung open and pre-loaded lorries drove out over steel slats laid over the mud and up the slipway to the enthusiastic crowd.

Brigadier Snow, accompanied by various dignitaries and with the band of the Duke of Cornwall's Light Infantry (DCLI) paraded through town, collecting a civilian following went to Elizabeth College at 14.00 where some 2,500 people witnessed the raising of the Union Flag and an official address including a message from King George VI, the Duke, was read out.

The majority of LSTs sailed for L’Ancresse bay, LST-516 withdrew when the tide had risen to be replaced in the old harbour by LST-295. Unloading would continue at night to suit the tide.

In Jersey, Operation Moslem followed a similar theme, securing Elizabeth Castle then creating a bridgehead in St Helier, securing casemates containing 10.5cm cannons and Pak 38(t) anti tank guns. Mines designed to destroy the harbour piers were made safe, aircraft kept watch overhead, phase II had newly landed troops moving to secure the town of St Helier and German headquarters. Phase III started at 10.15 hrs bringing troops ashore to move inland and secure electricity and water facilities.

DUKWs began to swim ashore and land, bringing supplies, LCIs started docking. St Aubin's bay was cleared for LSTs, numerous beach obstacles were destroyed and a gap created in the anti-tank beach wall. Jersey Scouts made themselves useful acting as messengers. A nine-year-old girl was killed when she stepped into the road and was hit by a motorcycle.

Brigadier Snow had left Guernsey and sailed to Jersey where at 18.00 hrs he participated in an historic proclamation reading in the Royal Square, where in 1781 a battle had taken place, resulting in the defeat of a French invasion force. Speeches and the message from the King were read out. Snow had been accompanied by the DCLI band who played the National Anthem and marches, resulted in much audience singing.

=== C-Day +1 (13 May) ===
Unloading continued in each island, by the end of the day, 3,427 men and 299 vehicles had been unloaded in Guernsey. St Sampson's harbour was brought into operation. German soldiers, now prisoners of war, were helping with the heavy work of unloading and moving supplies. 98% of weapons had been surrendered, the remaining ones were kept by Germans who were on guard duty.

In Jersey, St Aubin's bay was opened for LSTs to discharge their cargoes; vehicles included ambulances, cranes, bulldozers, a steam roller and wireless trucks. Lorries brought £477,000 of money to the island banks in 128 boxes. Many locals came to watch the unloading, they had never seen ships like these.

Empty LSTs were loaded with prisoners, around 800 per ship, who were eager to go as they had been promised food on board, almost resulting in a fight. German soldiers were half starved, the same as the islanders were.

=== C-Day +2 (14 May) ===
Unloading continued at St Aubin's bay. Road traffic reverted to driving on the left. Postal services opened for business with free postcards made available for people to send messages to relatives overseas. Clocks changed to British time.

Germans were working well with the British forces. Locals watched German soldiers being taken off the island in silence. It was estimated that around 10,000 PoWs would be taken off by the returning vessels from the first lift.

The British Home Secretary, Herbert Morrison arrived in Jersey on the destroyer HMS Impulsive in the early evening, accompanied by other government ministers and a Guernseyman, Wallace Le Patourel VC.

=== C-Day +3 (15 May) ===
A formal States of Jersey sitting to honour the visitors took place, Morrison congratulating the island for maintaining their British connections and explaining that the islands were never far from the thoughts of the British government during the five years of occupation. He attempted to explain that the British cabinet could not have helped the islanders in 1940, as any fighting would have resulted in high casualties, similarly to have attempted to take the islands back by force would have resulted in many deaths.

Orders were issued for the restoration of Sterling whereby Reichsmarks would be exchanged at the rate of 9.36 ℛℳ to £1, the same rate the Germans had used since 1942, until 23 May only. Sterling cash drawings from banks would be limited to £5 a week. The banks closed for two days so that accounts opened by evacuated islanders could be merged with local accounts.

Embarking of German PoWs continued, with engineers, naval and Luftwaffe being retained to continue work with the British. German troops were equally amazed by the strange landing ships.

=== C-Day +4 (16 May) ===
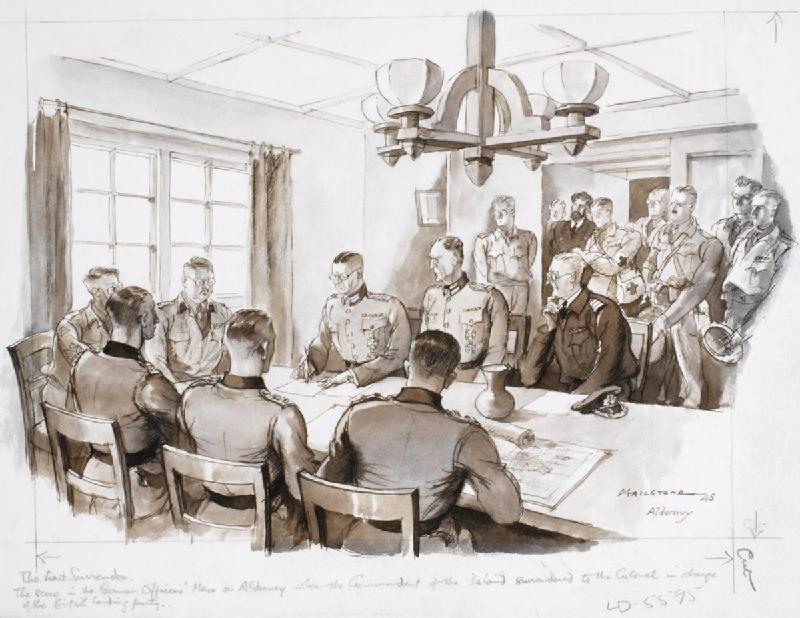
The Surrender - Official war artist Harold Hailstone's sketch of the surrender of the Alderney garrison

German troops in Alderney surrendered on this date to Force 135, the Channel Island Relief Force. (The German prisoners of war were not removed until 20 May and the population was not allowed to return until December when the island had been cleared up.)

On the islands, special police took over the tasks of guards on supply dumps, loudspeakers were erected through St Helier creating a public address system. Distributions of tea, chocolate, soap powder, lard, sugar, biscuits, cereals and rice etc. were made to civilians as the weekly rations were reorganised, increasing the daily calorie intake from the previous low of around 1,000. Red Cross parcels continued to be issued.

Houses used by Germans and Organisation Todt (OT) workers were inspected and many were found to be in a terrible state with holes knocked through walls, wood ripped up for fuel and all needing disinfecting. German and OT hospitals were cleared and the buildings disinfected.

Police courts opened for business, with a few civilians charged with theft, even of German equipment. Newspapers which had been desperate for newsprint, continued printing as supplies would shortly arrive.

Mines were being lifted and made safe; this process would go on until August, with 65,982 removed. This dangerous work would result in a number of German deaths and injuries. Over 5,689 beach obstacles and one hundred thousand metres (330,000 feet) of barbed wire were also removed. Weapons and shells needed to be collected and disposed of safely.

Operation Merit started when an armed trawler sailed for Alderney, carrying Brigadier Snow, officers and the press, accompanied by two LCI with support troops the coaster Beale, with supplies. Landing at Braye Harbour and met by the island commandant, the parties moved to a house later called Peacehaven to discuss the surrender details. Civil Affairs officers began interrogating OT workers, guards, prison officials and the few civilians present about the four camps on Alderney about which stories of brutality abounded, with the object of holding an enquiry.

== Aftermath ==
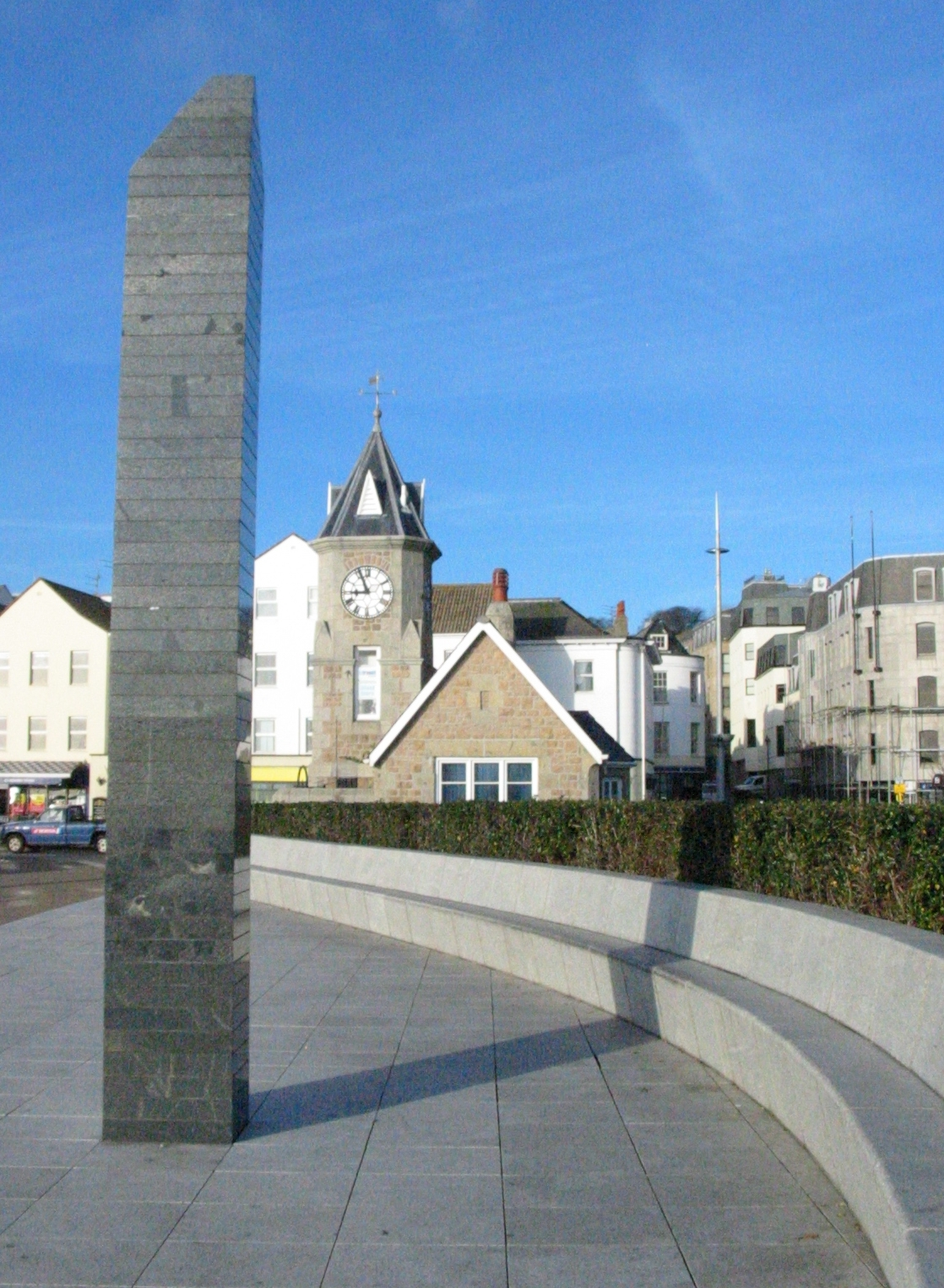
Liberation Monument, Guernsey, in the form of a sundial

The liberation of the Channel Islands was now complete and the tidy up and reconstruction of the islands was beginning. The period of military government lasted until 25 August 1945 when new lieutenant governors in each bailiwick were appointed.

The Germans had not tried to demolish any facilities; even so, innumerable problems would need to be resolved: paying compensation for requisitioned assets, and damage to houses, furniture, greenhouses and businesses during the occupation; taxation of war profiteers, including those involved in the black market; considering whether people should be prosecuted for crimes committed during the occupation and others should be publicly praised for their actions; regenerating and growing the tourist industries; and paying off the massive public debts: Jersey owed £5,960,000 and Guernsey £4,232,000.

Romances occurred: one British soldier kissed a girl on the 19th and proposed on the 21st, but was sent to Alderney next day; on his return in July, they married within 24 hours. Several Force 135 personnel later settled in the islands. Eric Walker became the bomb disposal officer for Jersey; he died in 2016.

There were other problems: tens of thousands of evacuated and deported civilians, especially children, many now grown up and realising their parents did not know them, returned to the islands, followed by the men in demob suits.

There were the sick, both physically and mentally, who never recovered from the experience. Anger and fear affected some people for decades before time would allow an element of forgiveness. As in the UK, rationing continued until the mid-1950s. Guy Fawkes parties into the 1960s dressed Guys in German uniforms.

The last Germans, including those on Alderney, left on 20 May, to join the 400,000 German PoWs in Britain, except for 1,500 in Guernsey, 1,300 in Jersey and 500 in Alderney who were retained for essential clearing up. On 23 May a small group of Wehrmacht soldiers were found on the Minquiers reef; they had been forgotten and wanted to surrender. The King and Queen flew to Jersey, then Guernsey for brief visits on 7 June. For lunch the royal couple and guests ate tinned steak and kidney pie and tinned fruit, the same as the German PoWs and British soldiers were eating. The first evacuees started to arrive from 25 June. Alderney residents had to wait until December before their island was safe to return to: 35,000 mines had to be removed, which caused casualties; 22 year old Sapper George Onions was killed. The houses had been very badly damaged. In December a number of honours were awarded: the two Bailiffs and Jurat Leale were knighted, and four CBEs and a number of OBEs and BEMs were also awarded to civil servants and civilians.

=== Awards made in 1945 ===
The Bailiff of Jersey (Alexander Coutanche), the Bailiff of Guernsey (Victor Carey), and Jurat Leale, President of the Controlling Committee, Guernsey, were knighted.

Charles Duret Aubin, HM Attorney-General, Jersey; Jurat Dorey, Jersey; and Ambrose Sherwill, HM Procureur, Guernsey, received CBEs.

==== OBEs (Jersey) ====
Jurat Bree; CJ Cuming, Connétable of Saint Helier; Dr McKinstry, Medical Officer of Health; K Bond; HF Ereaut

==== OBEs (Guernsey) ====
Deputy R Johns; HE Marquand; A Symons, Health Officer; L Guillemette; E Hall; G Heggs; J Loveridge; E Young

==== BEMs ====
Deputy W Bertram, Jersey, H Bichard, Guernsey, T Camp, Jersey, T Cross, Jersey, J Fraser, Jersey, A Lamy, Guernsey, E Langmead, Guernsey, M Messervy, Jersey, and J Remphry, Jersey.

Alderney had changed the most. Many civilians did not return; those that did would agree major changes to their constitution in 1948.

Castle Cornet was presented to the people of Guernsey in 1947 by the Crown as a token of their loyalty during two world wars.

== Commemoration ==
The commemoration of the liberation has changed over the years. May 9 is still a public holiday in Guernsey and in Jersey. For some islanders it is a chance to party, for others a day of quiet remembrance.

== See also ==
- Atlantic pockets
- Civilian life under the German occupation of the Channel Islands
- Deportations from the German-occupied Channel Islands
- Evacuation of civilians from the Channel Islands in 1940
