= Civilian life under the German occupation of the Channel Islands =

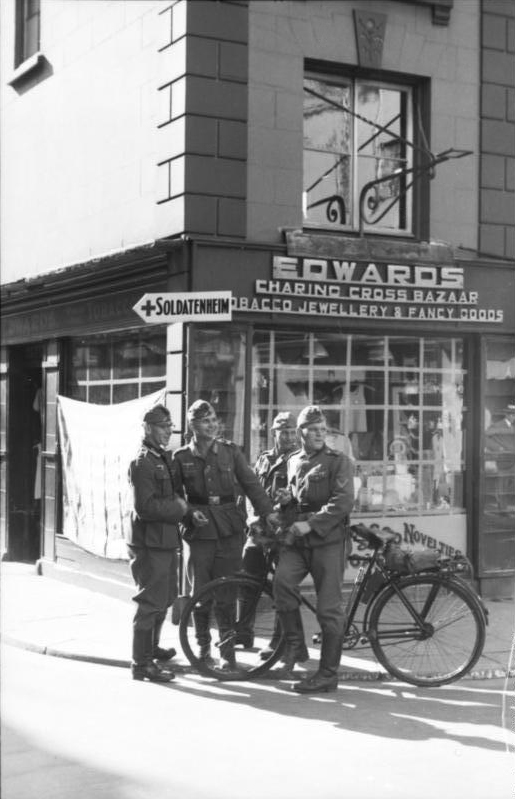
German soldiers in Jersey

During the five-year German occupation of the Channel Islands (30 June 1940 to 9 May 1945) civilian life became much more difficult. During that time, the Channel Islanders had to live under and obey the laws of Nazi Germany and work with their occupiers in order to survive and reduce the impact of occupation. Given no guidance on how to behave by the British government, there were individuals who got close to the enemy and others who undertook resistance activities.

Most felt they had no choice but to accept the changes and depredations to their lives and hope that external forces would someday remove the forces of occupation. The winter of 1944–45 was particularly hard; food and fuel were in short supply.

Overall, and considering that at times there were two German soldiers and one Organisation Todt (OT) worker for every five civilians in the very small land area in the islands, there was minimal contact and socialising.

== Milestone events ==
A number of events greatly affected the whole civilian population in the Channel Islands:

- June 1940 evacuation of children and adults to the UK
- 28 June 1940 bombing of islands by the Luftwaffe
- July 1940 German troops arrive and occupation starts
- Winter 1941–42 when the islands were inundated with soldiers and construction workers
- September 1942 and February 1943 deportations of civilians to Germany
- October 1943 Funeral of sailors from HMS Charybdis and HMS Limbourne particularly in Guernsey
- Resistance in the German-occupied Channel Islands#Passive resistance
- 6 June 1944 Normandy landings
- 27 December 1944 SS Vega bringing Red Cross parcels
- 9 May 1945 Liberation

== Evacuation ==
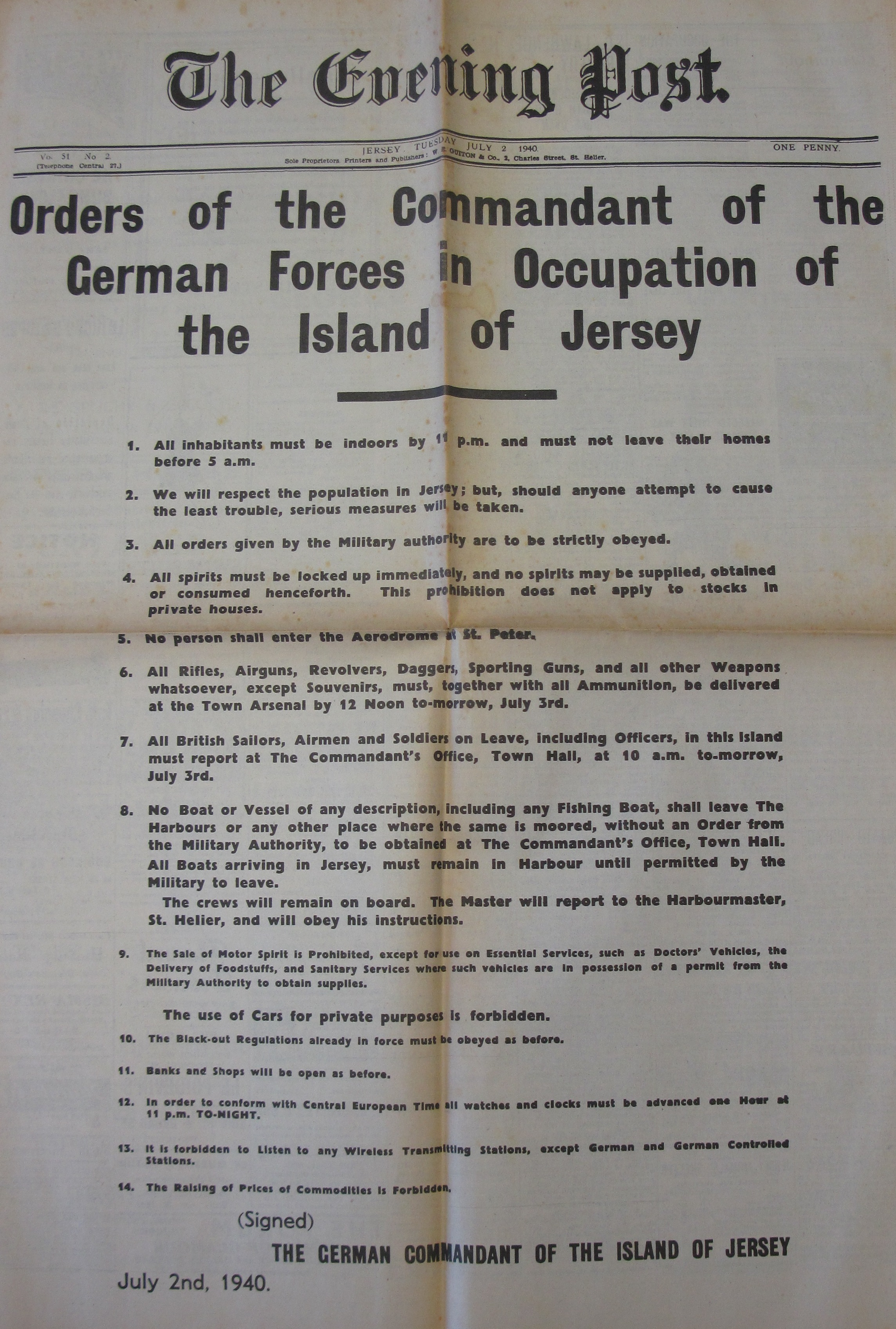
Orders of the Commandant of the German Forces in Occupation of the Island of Jersey, 2 July 1940

A number of civilians, mainly men, had left the islands in the winter of 1939–40 to join the armed forces. With the invasion of Belgium in May 1940 a few people decided to leave the islands using their own resources. In June, there was a fear the trickle would become a flood. Arrangements were made by the UK and island governments to provide shipping and recommendations to evacuate Guernsey children were issued at short notice. This resulted in most school children leaving. Teachers were ordered to leave with them. Parents, however, were initially not normally permitted to travel with them unless there was a child under school age. In Jersey no order was given for schools to be evacuated.

Evacuation was then opened up for other people, but with the shortage of shipping and to avoid panic, people were recommended to "stay put". Confusion reigned, with all but a handful leaving Alderney, very few leaving Sark, only 6,600 leaving Jersey and 17,000 departing Guernsey. Some ships sailed from Jersey empty.

The decision to leave or stay was personal. Reasons for leaving ranged from noble (to join the fight), to fearful. Reasons for staying included defiance (not willing to be intimidated), age (too old to move), money (not wanting to abandon businesses or houses), caring (not wanting to abandon elderly parents or pets), or duty (civil servants and other essential workers were asked not to leave). Some literally missed the boat. King George VI sent a message of hope to the Bailiffs of each Island, with the request that it be read out to the people.

Over 25,000 people had been evacuated to Britain, including most children, but 41,101 remained on Jersey, 24,429 on Guernsey, and 470 on Sark. Alderney had just 18. The governments in Jersey and in Guernsey were operational, though the emergency services were understaffed due to the evacuation to the UK.

The British Government had decided on 15 June to demilitarise the islands, so all military personnel, weapons, and equipment had been taken to England. They did not tell the Germans, and on 28 June German bombers appeared in the skies and bombed and strafed various places on both islands, including the harbours of Saint Peter Port and Saint Helier, killing 44 and wounding over 70 civilians. A ship in Guernsey harbour returned ineffective fire.

While the German commanders were finalising their plans for Operation Grünpfeil (Green Arrow) to invade the islands with assault troops, a German Dornier Do 17 pilot decided to land on 30 June at Guernsey airport and have a look around. He returned to France and notified his superiors that the island appeared to be undefended. More aircraft were sent over. A Junkers Ju 52 landed, and the Germans were given a note by the head of the police confirming the islands were not defended. The next day, aircraft brought German troops to both islands: the occupation had begun. Everyone who had stayed became trapped for almost five years in the islands.

=== Guidance on occupation ===
While Great Britain had occupied distant overseas territories in the past, there was little to no advice on how citizens were expected to behave under occupation. The British Treason Act 1800, as amended, gave the consequences of treason. The British Treachery Act 1940 was only passed as a law in the UK on 23 May 1940. The only Jersey law on treason dated from 17 June 1495.

The island governments, headed by their bailiffs, Victor Carey in Guernsey and Alexander Coutanche in Jersey, had been ordered by the British government to remain on their islands to maintain law and order and to do what they could for the civilians. This put them under a duty of care. When the lieutenant governors, who were the king's representatives on each island, departed on 21 June 1940, their powers and duties were vested in the bailiffs, namely to protect the islands and their population. Taking on the duties of the lieutenant governors added a further duty of care.

=== Changes to government operation ===
In Guernsey, the States of Deliberation had voted on 21 June 1940 to hand responsibility for running island affairs to a Controlling Committee, under the presidency of HM Attorney General Ambrose Sherwill. Sherwill was selected rather than the bailiff, Sir Victor Carey, as he was a younger and more robust person. The committee had been given almost all the executive power of the States, and had a quorum of three persons under the president (who could nominate additional members). The Controlling Committee initially had eight members. Sherwill was imprisoned by the Germans as a result of his attempts to shelter the British servicemen in the fallout from Operation Ambassador in 1940. He was released but banned from office in January 1941. Jurat John Leale replaced him as president of the Controlling Committee.

The States of Jersey passed the Defence (Transfer of Powers) (Jersey) Regulation 1940 on 27 June 1940 to amalgamate the various executive committees into eight departments each under the presidency of a States member. The presidents along with the Crown Officers made up the Superior Council under the presidency of the bailiff.

Since the legislatures met in public session, the creation of smaller executive bodies that could meet behind closed doors enabled freer discussion of matters such as how far to comply with German orders.

== Working with the German occupiers ==
The governments of the islands enacted emergency legislation to manage the crisis and, when the occupiers arrived, had to come to arrangements to reduce the impact of the occupation on the civilians under their care. Businesses had to conform to the changing rules and regulations, including how to deal with a German customer or suffer reprisals. Individuals generally tried to avoid contact.

On arrival in the islands, the Germans issued proclamations imposing new laws on the resident islanders. As time progressed, additional laws restricting rights were posted and had to be obeyed.

Anyone caught and sent to prison may have had to wait until space became available. Short sentences were served in the islands, which was very difficult. Rations were roughly half of what civilians got; and if sent away to prison, it was even worse, and the risk of dying increased. As the war progressed, prisoners sentenced for possession of radios were released early to reduce the demand on German supplied food rations.

Assemblies in churches and chapels were permitted and prayers for the British royal family and the welfare of the British empire could be said although nothing could be said against the honour or interests of the German government or forces. German soldiers were free to attend services. Open air meetings were banned as were The Salvation Army, the Freemasons, the Odd Fellows and the Ex-Servicemen's clubs. La Sociéte Guernesaise and La Sociéte Jersisise were permitted to continue holding meetings.

Resistance took place with little success. Amongst the notable events was feeding and hiding a few OT workers, at the cost of a number of civilians being imprisoned and the death of Louisa Gould in Ravensbrück concentration camp.

=== German orders ===
The German Feldkommandantur 515 (FK515) led by Colonel Rudolf Graf von Schmettow until October 1941, then Colonel Friedrich Knackfuss until February 1944, and finally Major Heider, dealt with civilian matters with the island civil authorities.

The military consisted of varying numbers of troops, around 25,000 in October 1944, with an additional 15,000 Organisation Todt (OT) workers once fortification of the islands began in October 1941.

There was some animosity between the troops in the garrison and FK515 men who were mainly civilians.

Soldiers were punished for crimes against civilians. As the war progressed and soldiers were rotated out to other war zones, however, the quality of soldiers decreased, affecting their manners and attitudes. Serious problems started to arise in the last year of occupation when food was in short supply.

The local German command seems to have tried to keep the civilian population as happy as possible, letting them govern themselves, paying them for work done and not enacting too many draconian orders sent over from France. Resistance activity by islanders would not be tolerated, however. Punishment of the guilty served as a deterrent to others.

The Germans used propaganda on the islanders. Open air band concerts were promoted, and one of the 1942 deportees, Irishman Denis Cleary, was returned to the island with glowing reports of centrally-heated huts, soldiers carrying the luggage of the internees and abundant food.

There were no Waffen-SS troops except in Alderney, although some people seeing the few men wearing a black panzer uniform with a deaths head collar badge mistook these tank men for SS.

=== Discipline ===
German soldiers would without fail obey orders from their superiors. The discipline imposed over the German soldiers was generally very good, although as troops were rotated and poorer quality Ostlegionen soldiers serving in the German army began to arrive, there was a fall. Most men realised that they had a safe and secure billet and would not risk a transfer to the eastern front.

Soldiers quickly discovered that the islanders did not consider themselves British but were loyal to the King and Queen, simply looking forward to the day when the Germans would depart. Most soldiers kept their distance from the islanders although some fraternisation took place and a few soldiers returned after the war to marry their sweethearts.

Off-duty the soldiers were entertained in many ways. There were locally produced newspapers and going to the cinema or church. Live entertainment and sport was encouraged. Soldatenheime were established, being similar to a British NAAFI or American PX, and officers established clubs. Freudenhaus or brothels were established in Guernsey and Jersey, importing women to work in them. There were hobbies such as photography and visiting beaches.

The islands were promoted as a tourist destination for German soldiers with guide book Die Kanalinseln: Jersey – Guernsey – Sark by Hans Auerbach which was printed in 1942 in Paris, France.

=== Civil authorities ===
The island authorities were allowed to continue managing the civilian population, courts, and services, with limited interference, subject to all new laws requiring German knowledge (and therefore consent). Any German-originating laws would require the civil authorities to register them in the same manner as local laws.

The civil authorities of each island, represented by the bailiffs, were the elected members of the island parliaments. Civil servants and emergency services had of necessity to work in a professional manner with the occupiers for the benefit of the civil population. They had been ordered to do this by the Secretary of State in letters dated 19 June 1940. It did not stop the Germans from using such arrangements for publicity purposes, such as photographing "British" policemen opening doors and driving cars for, and saluting, German officers.

On 8 August 1940, less than two months into the occupation, Ambrose Sherwill, President of the Controlling Committee of Guernsey, broadcast on German radio that, while the Channel Islanders remained the "intensely loyal subjects" of the British Sovereign, the behaviour of the German soldiers on Guernsey was "exemplary" and he was grateful for their "correct and kindly attitude." He affirmed that the leaders of the Guernsey government were being treated with courtesy by the German military. Life, he said, was going on just as it did before the occupation. Sherwill's objective was to ease the minds of relatives in Britain about the fate of the islanders. German authorities made propaganda usage of his broadcast. The British government was furious, but Sherwill's speech seems to have been greeted with approval by most of the islander population.

Sherwill's broadcast illustrated the difficulty for the islander government and citizens to co-operate—-yet stop short of collaborating—-with their occupiers, and to retain as much independence as possible from German rule. The issue of islander collaboration with the Germans remained quiescent for many years, but was ignited in the 1990s with the release of wartime archives and the subsequent publication of a book titled The Model Occupation: The Channel Islands under German Rule, 1940–1945 by Madeleine Bunting. Bunting commented that the Channel Islanders "did not fight on the beaches, in the fields or in the streets. They did not commit suicide, and they did not kill any Germans. Instead they settled down, with few overt signs of resistance, to a hard, dull but relatively peaceful five years of occupation, in which more than half the population was working for the Germans." Language such as the title of one chapter, "Resistance? What Resistance?" incited islander ire. The issue of collaboration was further inflamed by the fictional television programme Island at War (2004) which featured a romance between a German soldier and an islander girl and portrayed favourably the German military commander of the occupation.

From the start, the islands won the right to keep their civil governments, courts and laws, the only concession being that Germans would have to approve all new laws passed. All German orders affecting the population would have to be registered with the civil authorities, breaches of which would normally be tried in civilian courts rather than German military ones. To lose this right would result in direct German rule, with the SS and Gestapo moving into the islands. The Germans threatened to do this on various occasions. Under this agreement, highly unpopular laws created by the Germans, in particular rules regarding Jews, were also registered as laws in the islands.

Each island could use their committees, a "Controlling Committee" in Guernsey and an "Executive Bodies" in Jersey, and enacted emergency powers to enable the running of the governments. What was achieved, could be described as subtle passive resistance. Co-operation had benefits, such as getting permission to obtain wood for civilian use, keeping rations at a higher level, being allowed to use German shipping to import food and clothing from France. A number of cases of police officers turning blind eyes to activities has been recorded, as well as getting Germans arrested for crimes.

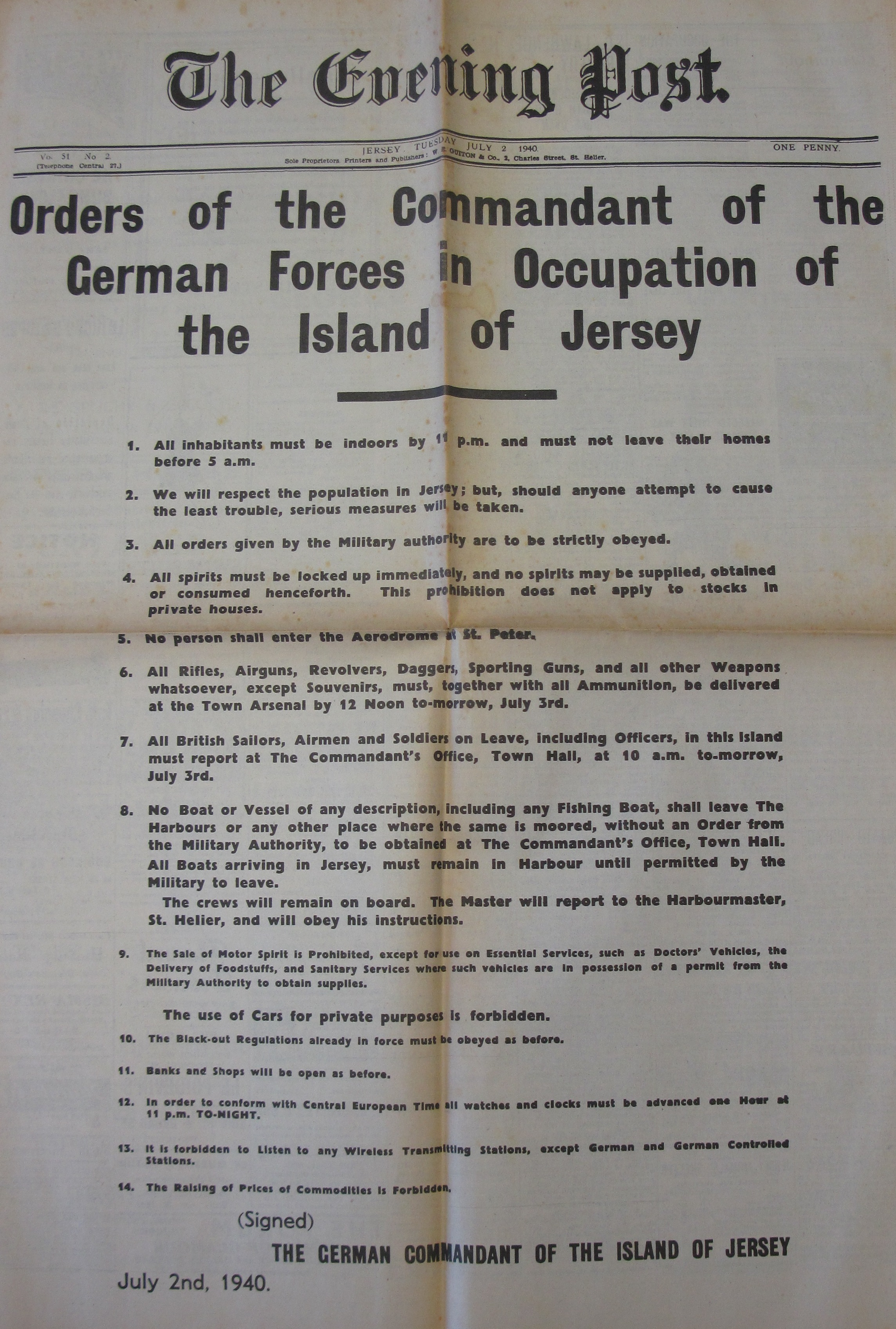
Orders of the Commandant of the German Forces in Occupation of the Island of Jersey, 2 July 1940

Like many occupied countries, the islands were required to pay the costs of the German troops that were stationed there, including wages, rent, food, drinks, transport and the salaries of those they employed. Objections to paying for an excessive number of troops were raised, and some of the sums charged from 1942 onwards were never paid; however, the income tax rose from 10d to 5/- in Guernsey and from 1/6 to 5/- in Jersey. Surtax and purchase taxes was introduced and civil service pay reduced, but even so, the islands ended the war with a debt of £9 million, roughly the total value of every house in the islands.

It was in the interests of both the Germans and the island authorities to clamp down on black market activities. Hoarding food and selling "under the counter" were crimes often linked to thefts and were dealt with by the island police and the military police. Interrogations by the Feldgendarmerie (German Field Police) might involve beatings with "rubber hoses".

Money provided by the Germans, who paid for such things as vehicles they requisitioned, was used, with German help, to fund trips to France to buy thousands of tons of essential food and other materials. This continued while shipping was made available, until mid 1944.

Unpalatable laws put forward by the Germans were sometimes openly argued against. Laws regarding registration of, and restrictions applied to, Jews were registered in the islands, which caused controversy after the war. The civil authorities could not win many of these battles. One that Jersey won, was the refusal to allow the "evacuation" to France of patients from their mental health hospital.

The civil authorities were often asked to accumulate information, not knowing what it would be used for; in August 1940 a list of aliens showed 407 in Guernsey. In October 1940, they produced a list of all German, Austrian and Italian people. A census was held of all civilians in August 1941. In September 1941, the census was used to make a list of all British-born people. This list identified people for deportation to camps in Germany in 1942 and 1943.

=== Civilians ===
Prior to the arrival of the German forces, the largest employer had been the States of Jersey and the States of Guernsey. Unemployment in Jersey at Christmas 1940 was 2,400 men. Many businesses closed or operated on reduced staffing levels, so many jobs vanished. The island governments tried to create suitable relief work. The island authorities introduced pay scales that were lower for single men or men whose wives and children were in England. They also cut the salaries of civil servants in half.

Civilian buses were suspended in July 1940. The drivers were still employed by the bus company, but were required to transport German soldiers instead. Similar situations existed in hotels taken over by Germans.

The German occupying forces, which had a need for builders, electricians, plumbers, mechanics, cleaning staff, quarry men, secretarial staff, labourers, translators and many other trades and skills, offered twice the normal island pay. All young men in the islands were required to register with the Feldkommandantur so they could be assessed and "recruited" as workers if not employed in useful work elsewhere. By 1943, around 4,000 islanders were directly employed by the Germans. Most of the skilled workers in the German building businesses under the collective Organisation Todt (OT) were volunteers, paid for their work and fed better than the drafted forced labourers from many nations, who were treated like slaves. The Germans would demand labour be provided. One job involving 180 men was to help level the airport, a clear breach of the Geneva Convention. Others, like gathering in the harvest in Alderney, were less objectionable.

Everyone had to put up with ID cards and a list of rules, such as not singing patriotic songs and cycling on the right, restrictions such as curfews and on fishing, rationing, requisition of houses (2,750 in Guernsey). The Germans requisitioned lorries, cars and bicycles, requiring the island government to pay for them. and confiscation of radios and subversive books. Necessary items ran out as the war progressed. German soldiers and OT workers were billeted in 17,000 private houses in 1942. Children had to learn German in school. Infrequent Red Cross messages between February 1941 and June 1944 were the only communication the islanders had with their evacuated children, relatives and friends.

The position of churches and chapels was not easy and while German ministers held military services in borrowed churches, where a German flag was placed over the altar, civilian services were open to all worshippers and many services took place attended by islanders, Germans and OT workers including Russians, praying, singing and taking communion together. Services were sometimes attended by the Feldgendarmerie to ensure sermons complied with the rules.

The deportations of 2,190 UK-born men, women, children and babies to Germany, the main group in September 1942, triggered a few suicides in Guernsey, Sark and Jersey, as well as the first public show of patriotism, resulting in arrests and imprisonment. Despite this, the treatment by Germans of the "evacuees" was better than those experienced in other European countries. The Germans provided field kitchens to cook food for the evacuees at the Guernsey harbour, put them onboard clean ships, transported them in second-class train carriages rather than in horse boxes and provided them rations for the journey.

The 100,000 mines installed by the Germans resulted in several deaths among the islanders. However, lack of essential medicines, like insulin, caused more deaths amongst civilians.

Survival became increasingly hard with reduced rations and lack of fuel. Death rates rose as the occupation progressed. Those with money could supplement their diet with black market produce. Islanders were saved from starvation with the arrival of the SS Vega, bringing Red Cross parcels during the winter of 1944–1945.

During the occupation, no civilian was deported for work in factories in Germany as occurred in most occupied countries. Local people working for the OT were paid and did so voluntarily, they were only employed in the islands. The OT set a pay rate of 60 per cent over normal civilian workers wages for Channel Island workers. German behaviour towards civilians was generally much better than in any other occupied zone.

=== Alderney and Sark ===
There were almost no civilians in Alderney during the occupation. The handful that did worked to feed themselves and undertook work for the thousands of OT workers and soldiers. In addition a few local islanders were asked to undertake temporary work in Alderney, such as marine divers.

On Sark, apart from two raids by British commandos, Operation Basalt and Hardtack 7, an Avro Lancaster bomber crash landing on the island and some of their citizens being included in the deportations, wartime occupation was largely peaceful and the soldiers very well behaved. The island supplied fish to Guernsey in exchange for other goods.

=== People on the islands ===
People in the islands fall into a number of main categories. Each category knew people they did not trust, others they did not like, and yet others they treated as enemies:

- Within the German army were soldiers from many countries:
  - Soldiers from Germany
  - Soldiers from the expanded Third Reich including Austria and Poland
  - Those from the eastern countries, called Ostlegionen soldiers by the Germans, they were treated worse than ordinary soldiers and were often hungry. They lived in fear of being returned to Russia where their fate would not be good.
- Organisation Todt workers fell into three categories:
  - Volunteer experts, recruited from many countries, well paid, allowed holidays and given benefits
  - Semi-volunteer workers (often given little choice about volunteering) who were paid and allowed some time off
  - Unskilled workers forced to work, who were badly paid, treated, clothed and fed. The worst treated become a category of slave workers, they appear in all islands but were mainly in Alderney camps
- Locals could fall into numerous categories. There were "informers", "black marketeers", those "too friendly with the enemy" those who "worked for the Germans", those who "antagonised the Germans" and lastly the category, the "normal" civilian

Locals could be OT workers, German soldiers and OT workers could also be black marketeers, any of them could be criminals and people held differing religious beliefs and differing political ideals. A few lived "underground", hidden away from sight, they might be Jews, escaped OT workers, escaped convicts including those who undertook "resistance" activities, or even soldiers. Authority was enforced by the Feldgendarmerie, the Geheime Feldpolizei and the local police.

== Property ==
The first wave of German troops on the island were housed in empty hotels. However within months the numbers of troops had increased and empty buildings, including schools and houses belonging to people who had evacuated in June 1940 were requisitioned.

Late in 1941 Hitler took the decision to fortify the islands and in the winter of 1941 and spring tens of thousands of soldiers and 15,000 construction workers arrived, all requiring accommodation. Some huts were built on camps for the OT workers, however many ended up being billeted in private houses that had a spare room. German soldiers and OT workers were billeted in 17,000 private houses in 1942. Households with a soldier billeted on them were paid a few shillings a week by the island government, but they were required to do his laundry.

Furniture was requisitioned or just taken and at the end of the war stores full of furniture had to be gone through by people looking for items taken from their houses. Jersey had 185,000 items of furniture looking for owners. A small number of people were ordered out of their houses on short notice when the house was requisitioned, this might be for accommodation or for fortification reasons, which could result in demolition.

A number of buildings were demolished by the Germans, often to improve lines of sight for guns, or obvious navigation markers, in Guernsey they included the Cobo Inn, the Cobo Institute the Doyle Monument at Jerbourg Point and the James Sausmarez monument at Delancey.

== Work ==
Changes caused by the occupation affected most workers, but especially shop and office workers. Many people had been evacuated leaving vacancies, however many businesses had a dramatic fall in trade, so required fewer employees. Certain jobs vanished overnight, such as bus and taxi drivers, people in the building trade found that the main employer became the German army.

Unemployed people were reduced to charity from their parish officials, so the island governments introduced a work programme before the end of 1940 to give employment to the increasing numbers of unemployed, 2,300 unemployed men in Jersey. This system continued throughout the occupation. Work undertaken included such things as road improvements., cutting timber for fuel and getting water mills working again. Jersey set up Summerland factory which employed 250 people for sorting making and repairing clothes and shoes. Guernsey created a boot factory; even so the waiting list for a pair of shoes could be a year.

Employees in businesses undertaking essential services including utilities were required to provide telephone, electric and water services to German buildings, including the new fortifications being built, as well as continuing with their normal work.

Civil servants had their pay cut, the governments also established a weekly wage rate of £2.10s. This was matched with a maximum price that could be charged for almost everything. There were complaints the prices were too low, leading to selling "under the counter".

The German pay rates were £1 a week higher, and attracted workers who could not live on the low wages paid in the civilian sector. The OT offered twice the normal island pay. In Jersey 600 were attracted by the higher wages.

In most European countries the Germans demanded workers and took adults away to Germany to work in factories and on the land, this did not happen to islanders.

== Food ==
The islands had been importing 80% of their food. Despite the reduction in the civilian population following the departure of evacuees up to June 1940, the increasing number of German soldiers and from 1942 OT workers made demands on limited resources.

Initially commercial growing provided the bulk of food, with supplements brought in from France. Anyone who had a garden was encouraged to grow their own vegetables. Seeds were obtained from France once local supplies ran out. Many people took to breeding hens and rabbits, however they were always prone to theft and had to be locked up and guarded.

Women generally spent hours a day queuing for what little food was available, sometimes using the waiting time to do knitting, often getting to the front to find nothing was left, then after collecting sticks and water from a well, using ingenuity and time preparing a meal, with men and what children that remained eating more than their fair share.

Calories for civilians from food controlled by rations amounted to roughly 1,350 per day in the 1941-44 period. The minimum amount is 1,500 for women and 2,000 for men. Rationed calories halved in the winter of 1944/5 making food an obsession, with the poor in the towns having to spend hours queuing for a few cabbage leaves and potato peelings, fainting with hunger, even after the life saving Red Cross parcels started to arrive.

=== Growing ===
Commercial growing of tomatoes in Guernsey continued during 1940 to 1943 with tons being shipped out to France on German military shipping. In Jersey the potato crops were grown as in normal years with the food used for exports and local consumption. Seed potatoes for Guernsey were acquired from France.

Lack of fertiliser began to show decreases in productivity. The local vraic was difficult to harvest as access to beaches was restricted. During 1942-3 Jersey lost access to 1,555 acres of arable land, 10% of the total, as they fell within newly fortified areas.

=== Requisition of food ===
The obligation of the bailiwicks to pay the cost of the occupation meant that the governments had to pay the food for the soldiers. The Germans requisitioned food that was grown so it was shared between the civilians and soldiers. The proportion was by negotiation but with the Germans holding the control, it would move more in favour of the soldiers as the war progressed, even so the German soldiers were close to starving during winter 1944–45.

=== Fishing ===
Important industries in the islands, some of the fishing boats had sailed away to England in June 1940. Fishing was banned in September 1940 following an escape. When permitted again, restrictions were put over them, including limiting their access to fuel.

Whenever another boat fled the islands, restrictions would increase, with a German guard boat or a soldier often placed on each boat. The fish catch decreased but provided a useful source of calories with Germans taking 20% of all catches.

Fish was rationed, 1 pound (0.45 kg) a week per household from May 1941.

Shore gathering of limpets, winkles and ormers were permitted in certain places at certain times. Rod fishing was also permitted on some beaches, care had to be taken of barbed wire and mines. Limpet pie was quite tasty but required two hours of boiling before being trimmed and then baked with swede in an oven.

=== Rations ===
Rationing in line with rationing in England was already operating when the islands were occupied, amendments to suit the food available from France was introduced in August 1940 . The ration supplies were under the orders of the Manche district of France and the islands set up a purchasing commission in the port of Granville to supply what needs could be met from French sources. Tens of thousands of tons of goods were purchased for cash, the goods being freighted to the islands on German shipping.

Every type of food, apart from vegetables and fruit, were soon rationed, as were clothing and footwear. Milk was rationed from October 1940 to half a pint per day, the island herds not being slaughtered for meat as milk, butter and cheese was considered more important.

Rations were reduced for civilians, until by the end of 1944 they were at a slow starvation level. The level of rations depended on whether one was a German, civilian or heavy manual worker.

=== Red Cross parcels ===
A few hundred parcels were received in spring 1943 having been forwarded from detainees in Oflag V-B which was located at Biberach an der Riß and Ilag VII in Laufen. The deportees having been treated as POWs received a generous supply of parcels and knowing conditions in the islands, used the German post service to deliver treats to friends and families.

Following the August 1944 British refusal to allow the evacuation of civilians from the Channel Islands, as proposed by the Germans, the Bailiff of Jersey with the agreement of the German authorities was allowed to send a message to Britain in November 1944 stating the level of food reserves available to the civilians with the request for Red Cross relief. In the autumn of 1944 various escapees had passed similar messages to the British about conditions in the Islands. Britain agreed to the request and the British Joint War Organisation (British Red Cross and Order of St John) worked with the International Committee of the Red Cross (ICRS) to organise the relief from Lisbon.

The arrival at the end of December 1944 of the ICRC ship SS Vega bringing Red Cross parcels certainly saved lives. The ship would return four more times before liberation on 9 May 1945. The third voyage brought flour, as the island had run out in February, it was white and enabled a 2 pounds (0.91 kg) loaf to be given to every civilian.

460,000 food parcels, each weighing over 10 pounds (4.5 kg) from Canada and New Zealand were delivered to the islands to be distributed by the Joint War Organisation, a British collaboration of St John Ambulance and the British Red Cross, to the 66,000 civilian population. They were the same as parcels sent to prisoners of war.

Church collections in aid of the Red Cross in early 1945 raised thousands of pounds, as people were so thankful for the help they were receiving. In total, £171,000 was raised by October 1945, equivalent to around £6,000,000 in today's money. This would continue after the war with the Red Cross being a highly favoured charity.

== Clothing ==
Clothing and shoes were quickly rationed as shops sold out. Jersey opened the Summerland factory to make clothes out of blankets, curtains and sheets. Nothing was thrown away, knitted objects were unravelled and remade. Other clothes were patched and repaired. Clothes in houses that belonged to evacuated people were requisitioned. As people lost weight due to the diet, new clothes needed to be found or clothes adjusted. Elastic supplies ran out. Shortages of needles and thread were relieved with supplies from France.

Shoes were a major problem; leather became impossible to obtain. Soles of shoes were made out of rope and wood. Uppers were knitted. 45,000 pairs of sabot were made in Jersey. Such inflexible shoes gave people foot troubles. Through 1943 the controller of footwear in Guernsey was supplying 60 people a day with shoes.

Washing clothes became a problem as time moved on as there was no soap and no fuel to heat water to wash clothes in. Most people outside the towns used wells as a source of water.

== Commerce ==
Most businesses continued to operate when possible and stocks lasted. They were not allowed to discriminate between local and German customers. The Germans had a very favourable exchange rate, so while shops had goods, including clothes, boots, cigarettes, tea and coffee, they bought everything up in massive quantities and posted them back to Germany, many for resale at a profit. Shops did not hold stocks back for locals until later in the war. Business hours were reduced, shop workers who had worked nine-hour days, 15 on Saturdays, were reduced to 20 hours a week.

A few businesses decided to work for the Germans. The Guernsey firm Timmer Limited, horticultural suppliers, took over increasing quantities of requisitioned land and greenhouses to grow food exclusively for Germans, and were given access to German transport facilities to export food to France.

=== Banks ===
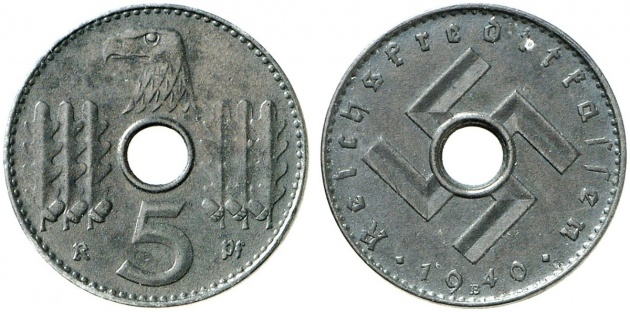
zinc 5 Reichspfennig for use in the occupied territories

Banks, whose main assets were inaccessible at their headquarters in London, had to freeze the bank accounts of their customers. The island governments had to stand guarantor to the banks to get them to make advances to people.

People evacuating had been limited to the amount of cash they could withdraw, these people putting deeds and valuables in safe deposit boxes. Germans later demanded access to these safe deposit boxes, looking for valuables. A box of gold coins from Barclays Bank, Guernsey, was carried on board an evacuation ship by one of the bank's employees.

£384,043 stg was left in the Channel Islands. British notes and coins became rare in 1941 and were supplemented by locally printed notes ranging from 6d to £1. German occupation marks were in circulation at a fixed exchange rate of 1 ℛ︁ℳ︁ to 2s.6d., favourable to the Germans.

At the end of the war Reichsmarks were converted to sterling at face value, a three-ton British army truck having arrived in each island loaded with £1m of Bank of England notes, which annoyed one farmer who had burnt two suitcases full of occupation notes a few days before, thinking they were worthless.

=== Shops ===
Shops quickly ran out of supplies, the buyers were German soldiers wanting to send parcels of luxuries home as well as locals, who had some money, buying up goods whilst they were available. Shops also hoarded goods, waiting for prices to rise.

There were few supplies arriving in the islands from France to restock the shops. Almost all goods had a government fixed maximum price attached with vendors being fined heavily for selling above the set price.

Bartering became common, advertisements in shops and the local papers offered a wide range of goods to meet a specific urgent need of the advertiser. Exchanges such as a nightgown for flour or a breeding rabbit for good shoes. Empty shops became exchange locations for a small fee.

Shops specialising in repair were in high demand, especially bicycle shops, and machinery and shoe repair shops. Old fire hoses were made into bicycle tyres, as were garden hoses. Chemists were called on to create exhausted items, like glue and matches. Oil and paraffin lamps were made from tins.

== Criminal activity ==
The German military police, the Feldgendarmerie (Field Police), worked with the civilian police to maintain law and order. The German military court tried all crimes involving Germans and civilian criminal activities involving German interests.

Antagonising the Germans achieved little, but had consequences. Putting "V" marks on signs and walls had island police rubbing them out before the Feldgendarmerie saw them. The police also found and warned children as young as six against the offence. German reaction was initially mild with warnings, then radios were confiscated from areas where the signs appeared, then men were required to stand guard duty in rotation all night for weeks to avoid a recurrence. On 21 February 1945, the Germans in Jersey used tar to daub hundreds of houses with swastikas. Four nights later in St Helier, many red, white and blue Union flags and "V" signs appeared overnight.

Civilian crimes against Germans or German property were supposed to be referred to the German police, many instances were overlooked at some risk to the policemen involved. Some police gave out verbal warnings of the dangers of being caught. In 1942, 18 Guernsey police officers were tried before the German military court for stealing or receiving foodstuffs and wood from a German military store.

A total of around 4,000 islanders were sentenced for breaking laws during the five-year occupation, just over one per cent of the population per annum. People had to wait to serve prison time due to overcrowding and the fact that many cells were requisitioned for German soldiers, men sentenced to solitary confinement had to share cells. 570 prisoners were sent to continental prisons and camps, of whom at least 31 died.

=== Black market activity ===
Hoarding food and goods became an industry as rationing became stricter and shortages grew worse. Farmers would keep back crops and not register animals born. Goods could always be traded. Both hoarding and bartering were illegal. There were 100 prosecutions in Guernsey in 1944, up from 40 in 1942.

Dealers in the black market included German officers and men as well as OT workers and many civilians. The worst off during the occupation were the poor in the island towns those who had no access to farms and could not afford the black market prices. The rich did not live well, but at least could buy adequate quantities of basic food. Prisoners could supplement their worse than normal rations by paying heavily for black market foods to be brought to them.

Black marketeering was large scale and profitable. A French doctor was found with a ton each of potatoes and salted beef, and a Jersey youth had £800 in his bank account when caught, a house could be bought for £250 and he was only 16 years old. Some black marketeers were Germans, including officers, and black market restaurants operated. People were caught breaking and entering and stealing goods to sell on the black market. One case in Guernsey of a Frenchman involved 20,000 cigarettes and 40 kg (88 lb) of tobacco. Even civilian prisoners could supplement their worse than normal rations by paying heavily for black market foods to be brought to them. Importing restricted goods from France for the black market was not considered a problem by the civilian police as it supplemented local supplies.

In Alderney, the Lager Sylt commandant, Karl Tietz was brought before a court-martial in April 1943 and sentenced to 18 months penal servitude for the crime of selling on the black market, cigarettes and watches and valuables he had bought from Dutch OT workers.

== Schools ==
5,000 Guernsey schoolchildren had been evacuated and many of the now empty classrooms closed. Some schools were used for barracks by soldiers and administrative offices, the Forest school in Guernsey became a hospital, as did the Jersey College for Girls building. A few teachers had remained in Guernsey and a few retired teachers helped teach the children who stayed, 1,421 in Guernsey, of which 1,100 were in school.

In Jersey, the reverse happened, all but 1,000 of the 5,500 children stayed in the island with 140 teachers. All schools were provided with air raid shelters for the children. Sitting 11 year exams continued as normal in Jersey in January 1941 with children taking the bus to St Helier, talking amongst themselves in Jèrriais. The only change to the curriculum was the compulsory teaching of German as a language from January 1942, taught by local teachers to avoid German officers being sent into schools. Supplies such as paper, were short so slates were reintroduced.

The school leaving age in Jersey was increased to 15 to try to stop youngsters getting into trouble on the streets, despite this, two girls aged 14 and 15 spent three days in jail for spitting cherry stones at Germans. The classrooms still in use were unheated and lighting was limited, even so examinations were set and sat by the older pupils. After the war leaving certificates were presented once papers had been marked externally.

== Recreational activities ==
=== Entertainment ===
The occupation had a limited impact, band concerts in parks were provided by the Germans. Theatres stayed open, sometimes operating in church halls, until summer 1944. Censors limited productions and the curfew required productions to start earlier than normal. During the summer of 1943 75,000 attended shows at Candie in Guernsey.

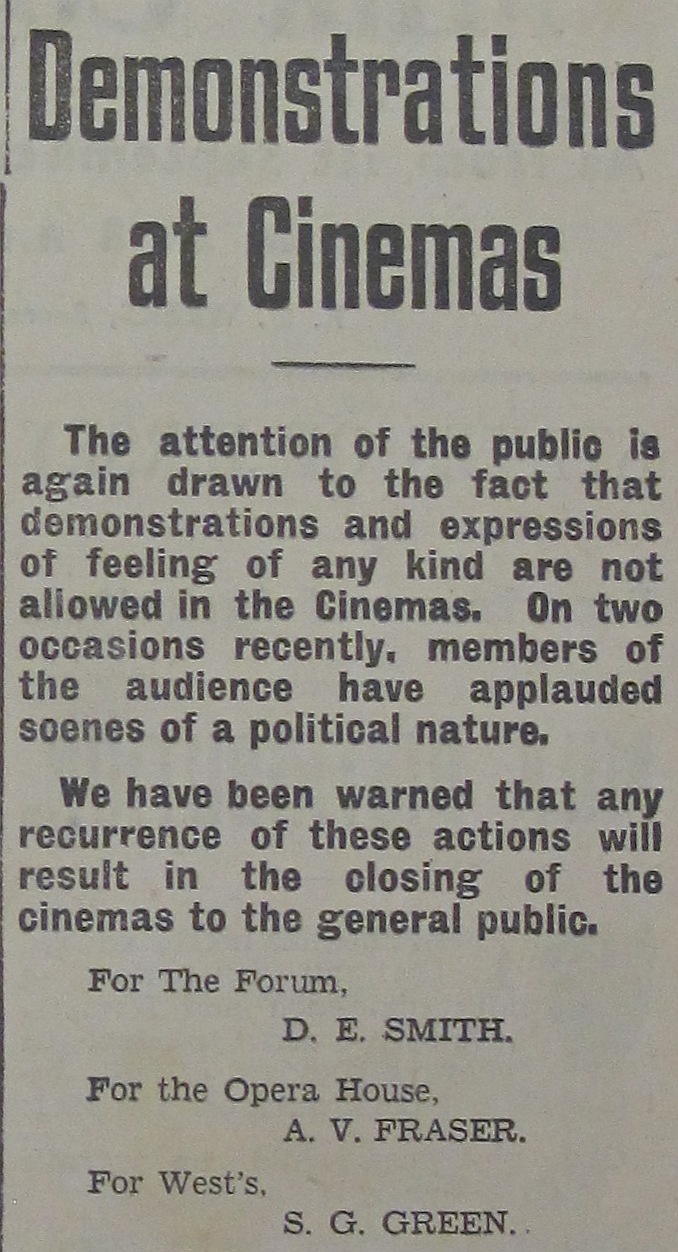
Demonstrations at Cinemas August 1941 Jersey

Cinemas stayed open, with separation of German soldiers and civilians; however, although the number of films was limited, Jersey and Guernsey exchanged their films which were supplemented with French and German language films from the continent. When allied soldiers were shown, even if prisoners, the local audience would cheer. Interest in the cinema flagged for civilians when the supply of films in English ran out.

Dance classes took place through the war. Dances with German soldiers and local girls took place from 1942; however, in 1943 they were banned in Jersey due to an outbreak of diphtheria. A dance show in Guernsey attracted an audience of 500 a performance for a fortnight.

Boxing tournaments were popular entertainment, as were Beetle Drives. Public houses stayed open, with reduced hours and limits on selling hard spirits. Card games, including the local Euchre, darts and shove ha'penny were popular.

Sport was also popular and continued as a relief from boredom, until the shortage of food left people without the energy to participate. Occasionally games were followed by a visit to a pub for a half pint, if beer was available. One football match attracted a crowd of over 4,000. There were recorded games against German teams, a football game in July 1940 was won by Guernsey. Sport also included, cricket, baseball, rugby and in 1940 a church to church walk.

With the curfew, home entertaining had to finish earlier than normal, whether it was having a meal, a musical evening or to play card games, or else everyone spent the night, returning home next morning.

From 6 June 1944, all amusements and theatres were closed. Curfew was extended from 9 pm to 6 am. Care had to be taken during the war over showing a light at night as it was not unknown for a German soldier to simply shoot at a lit window.

=== Clubs ===
Many clubs were allowed to stay open, after applying for permission, with a few exceptions, such as the Salvation Army the Odd Fellows and many children's clubs including the Scouts, Girl Guides, Boys' Brigade and Girls' Life Brigade. The Freemasons were closed down, but avoided persecution, as had happened elsewhere although moveable property was stolen and the buildings devastated by Germans. There were occasional restrictions placed on numbers of people meeting, such as at military funerals following the large numbers who turned out to pay their respects to drowned British sailors.

== Transport and fuel ==
The rationing of petrol caused civilian cars and then motorcycles to leave the roads within days of the occupation starting. A limited bus service ran for a while. Some delivery vans were allowed. Bicycles became the standard form of transport, but strong bikes were requisitioned by the Germans.

The horse and cart came back into use for freight and as a horse-drawn bus, with old prams being used by people to transport heavy goods. Attaching a basket to a walking stick also helped.

=== Petrol ===
Immediately rationed from July 1940, civilian cars almost ceased to operate. There were exceptions such as for doctors, a number of people had to swap to motorcycles to eke out the legal fuel ration. The mileage of vehicles had to be reported to ensure black market fuel was not being added, leading to the disconnection of mileometers to avoid discovery.

A large number of vehicles were requisitioned by the Germans and shipped to France. Over 100 buses, cars, vans, lorries and even an ambulance were converted to run on wood gas, produced using charcoal and wood, called Gazogene units

=== Heating, lighting and cooking ===
Coal could no longer be imported from June 1944 and ran out three months later. Small amounts of peat were cut for fuel. Gas was restricted from 1941, both by appliances and the hours when it was available, running out completely in December 1944.

Electricity restrictions started in April 1942, with limited usage and hours of use, the supply ceasing in February 1945. The shortage of power for pumping caused the piped water supply to be restricted.

The cutting of wood was restricted from the start of the occupation and rationed from July 1941. Gathering wood needed a permit, even if on your own land. Late in the war people started stripping empty houses of wood then burning furniture. In December 1944 a household with six people with no gas or electricity was allowed 2cwt, 224 pounds (102 kg) of wood a week. The scenery had changed by the end of the war, many thousands of trees had been cut down all over the islands.

Paraffin lamps were made out of tins. It was only allowed for lighting and supplies ran out in July 1944. Candles were scarce, households were allowed only one per week. Matches were also very scarce.

The old tradition system of taking food in crocks, such as Bean Jar to a bakers to cook in their cooling ovens during the day, for a fee of 3d was encouraged.

Haybox cooking became popular. This required food in a pot to be brought up to heat, then the pot was placed in the centre of a box, packed with hay and left to cook slowly for hours, without using additional fuel.

Furze ovens were brought back into use in old farmhouses. Communal kitchens were set up, as early as 1940. Jersey using commercial facilities such as bakeries had produced 400,000 meals by the end of 1943 and the States of Jersey had supplied over 2,000,000 pints of soup. Guernsey relied more on mobilising the voluntary sector.

Sawdust stoves were made from a tin, with the compacted sawdust mixed with tar burnt to create heat.

== Communications ==
All external telephone links were severed within days of occupation and all radio transmitters were seized. Post was disrupted and subject to censorship and control, with initially no post permitted outside of the islands. English postage stamps continued in use; when they ran out in 1941, 2d stamps were cut diagonally in half to make 1d stamps. and in both islands local stamps were printed, in Jersey incorporating the royal cipher GR.

In September 1940 the first letters allowed to be sent via the Red Cross from Jersey were limited to 220 in number. The Germans initially refused to accept any letters to anyone who had evacuated the Island before the invasion.

In Guernsey in 1940, the Germans proposed, instead of letters, to record a message to be transmitted by them over a radio so that people in Britain could listen. The message recorded by Ambrose Sherwill was broadcast and caused controversy as it mentioned the exemplary conduct of the German soldiers and how the population was being well looked after. This was not the way Churchill wished the Germans to be perceived, but would have provided comfort to islanders in Britain.

During the occupation, no civilians had access to a radio transmitter, nor was any attempt made from England to deliver one to the islands.

Telephone calls were listened to at the exchanges. Not many people had phones, even so the usage by civilians ceased in June 1944 and even by emergency services from January 1945.

=== Red Cross messages ===
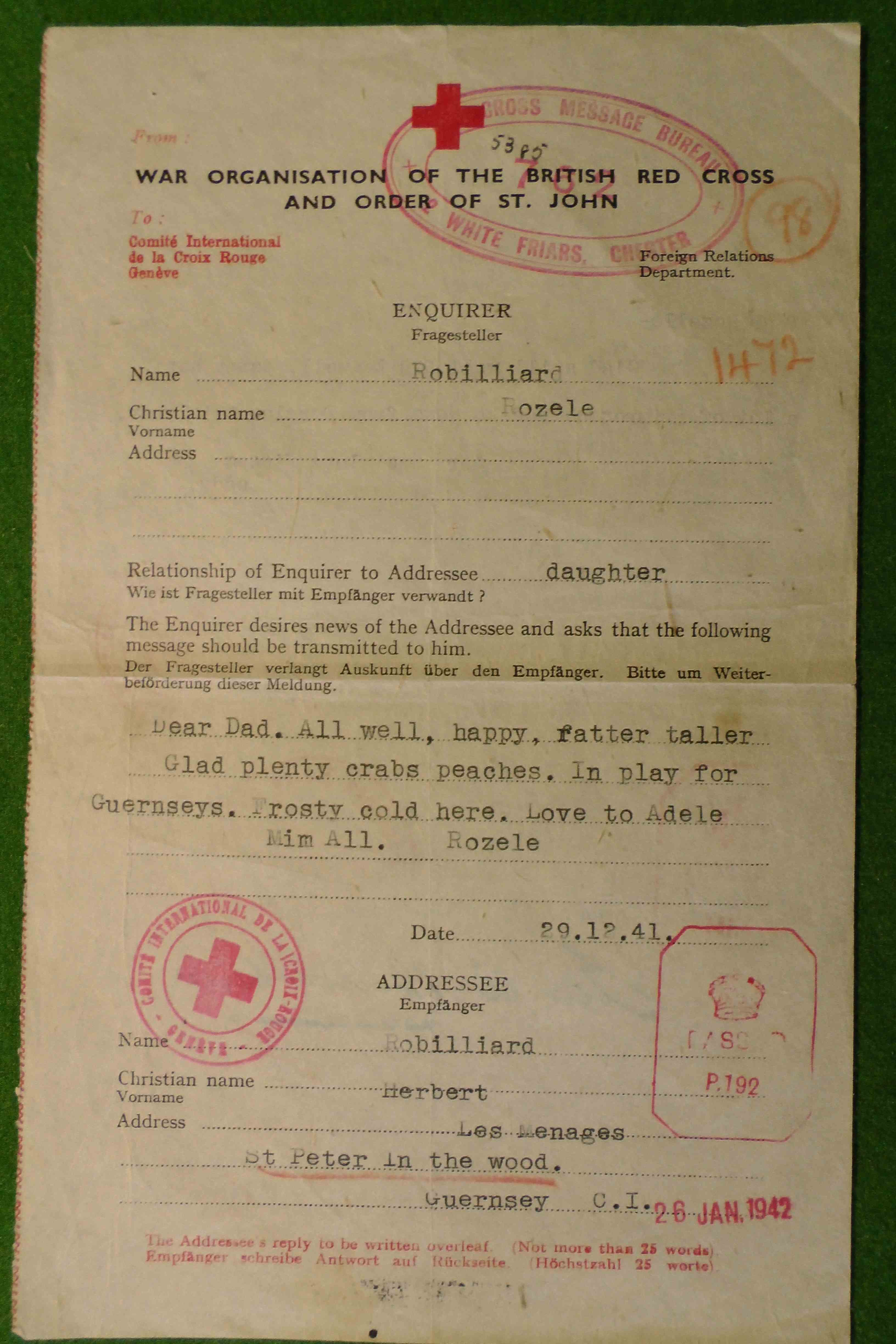
December 1941 Red Cross letter from England

Red Cross messages became very important to the islanders. Normally routed via Germany then Sweden or Portugal, they could take weeks or months to arrive. The number of words written on the cards was limited, as well as vetted. Many islanders placed secret codes in their messages to their evacuated relatives. Many Red Cross letters were published in a monthly magazine, The Channel Islands Monthly Review created in Stockport, England by adult Channel Island evacuees.

This was one area where restriction were gradually lifted, the number of words increased from 10 to 25. The number and frequency of cards one could send also increased. The requirement to come and collect your message changed to simply posting the message to recipients.

Nearly a million messages were dealt with by the bureau volunteers before the islands were isolated in late 1944 and messages stopped.

=== Censorship ===
Newspapers were censored from the start, with papers often carrying articles written by Germans who purported to be editors. Printing exactly what they were given, the bad English used in "German" articles gave away the propaganda items. During those months when it was possible to listen to the BBC openly it was also clear who was telling the truth. A Jersey paper written in Jersey French caused problems for the Germans as they could not translate it and it ceased production.

Paper became scarce so newspapers became smaller, dropping to just one page and then began to print on alternate days. Official announcements being displayed in shop windows.

Resistance newssheets were printed secretly as a means of circulating news from the BBC. Most people involved were eventually arrested and a number died in prisons. Allied propaganda leaflets were not dropped after summer 1940. In autumn 1944 leaflets were dropped to encourage Germans to surrender.

Libraries were popular and operated through the war after having some titles withdrawn through censorship.

=== Radios ===
For the first four months, radio receivers were permitted and people could listen to the BBC. Then, following a preliminary commando raid when two men were trapped in Guernsey, 8,000 radios were confiscated and handed in within Guernsey alone. It was easy to identify owners as almost everyone had a BBC radio licence. Returned in December 1940, they were again confiscated in June 1942 for "military reasons"; a coincidence that it followed a devastating raid by 1,000 bombers on Cologne.

If people had more than one radio, they might hold one back, or just hand in an old broken set. Other people made crystal radio sets. It was possible to make crystals, wire was available, the hardest object was a speaker. Stripping down telephone receivers solved that problem.

Radios and crystal sets had to be well hidden as listening to them had severe penalties of up to six months in prison with a very heavy fine. Imprisonment of a number of people resulting in some deaths, including Frederick William Page who died in Naumburg-an-der-Saale penal prison.

The BBC did not broadcast any programmes aimed at the Channel Island civilians for fear of retribution being made against the civilians, it left the islanders feeling forgotten although in July 1940 on the Forces programme a message was transmitted about the progress of evacuated children. and on 24 April 1942 a message was sent. 20 minute programmes were scheduled by the BBC for Christmas Day 1941. and on the same day in 1942 however it is not known if they were broadcast

== Medical treatment ==
The reduction in normally accepted facilities, heating, warm food, warm dry clothing, soap as well as a poor diet resulted in an increase in minor ailments such as dysentery, head lice and scabies, and in major ailments such as typhus, brought to the islands by Russian OT workers. This resulted in a number of deaths. Typhoid and infectious hepatitis appeared more frequently as the war progressed and clean water became scarce.

Ambulances changed from motorised back to a horse-drawn wagons. Doctors, dentists, nurses and St John ambulance staff worked quite closely together, treating civilians, soldiers and OT workers. There were restrictions regarding helping injured German soldiers from 1942. Each group had its own hospital.

An outbreak of diphtheria in Jersey quickly led to the island running out of antitoxin, it was contained by isolation and bans on public gatherings. Medical supplies where possible, were made locally, bandages made from torn up sheets, moss was an alternative for cotton wool, with some medicines sourced from France. A few supplies, such as insulin, came through after 1942 from the Red Cross, but too late for 30 patients in Jersey.

Babies born during the occupation received the best facilities available, irrespective of whom the father might be, with midwives in Jersey having to learn the different way female Soviet OT workers birthed and then wrapped up their babies in a cocoon.

Malnutrition became common amongst most civilians, some losing up to 40% of their body weight. This led to related illnesses, with swellings, bad teeth and making them susceptible to diseases like tuberculosis. The death rate in January 1945 in Jersey was three times normal.

== Resistance ==
Despite severe penalties, some resistance took place in the islands. A number of civilians died in prisons. There were few instances of active resistance and immaterial damage was done to the occupying forces.

The most visible sign of passive resistance occurred in Guernsey following the sinking of HMS Charybdis and HMS Limbourne on 23 October 1943, the bodies of 21 Royal Navy and Royal Marines men were washed up in Guernsey. The funeral attracted over 20 per cent of the population, laying 900 wreaths. This was enough of a demonstration against the occupation for subsequent military funerals to be closed to civilians by the German occupiers. The ceremony is commemorated annually.

Apart from islanders serving in the allied armed forces, the islands can claim the most damage done to the Nazi regime was absorbing large quantities of concrete and steel and keeping 30,000 German troops mis-deployed, who could have been used elsewhere to defend the Third Reich.

One of the French artillery pieces brought to the island and installed in Batterie Strassburg at Jerbourg Point in 1942 may have been sabotaged in France, as the breach exploded on the 22 cm gun when it was fired, killing several German marines.

== Collaboration ==
=== Joining the German Army ===
No islanders joined active German military units.

=== British Free Corps ===
Eric Pleasants, a British seaman, met up with Dennis Leister, an Englishman of German extraction who had gone to Jersey as part of the Peace Pledge Union party. They took to burglary of houses left unoccupied by families that had evacuated. In 1942, they were sentenced by the German military court for a number of offences and sent to Dijon to serve their sentences. They returned to Jersey on their release in February 1943, but were deported as undesirables to Kreuzberg in Germany. They both joined the British Free Corps (Britisches Freikorps) a unit of the Waffen SS, which comprised at its peak just 27 men. Pleasants ended up at large in Soviet-occupied Berlin until he was caught in 1946 and sent to a prison in Siberia. He was repatriated in 1954. Leister was jailed by British courts for three years.

=== Working for the Nazi regime ===
Eddie Chapman, an Englishman, was in prison for burglary in Jersey when the invasion occurred. Chapman and fellow prisoner Anthony Faramus, a Jerseyman, offered to work for the Germans as spies. They were arrested by the Germans and sent to Fort de Romainville France. Faramus was rejected and sent to Buchenwald concentration camp; he would survive the war. Chapman was accepted by the Abwehr and, under the code name Fritz, trained as a spy. On landing in Britain, he turned himself in to the authorities and became a British double agent under the code name ZigZag, ending the war with an Iron Cross from Hitler, a British pardon and £6,000 from MI5.

Pearl Vardon, a Jersey-born teacher, spoke German and worked for an Organisation Todt company as an interpreter. After entering into a relationship with a Wehrmacht officer, Oberleutnant Siegfried Schwatlo, when he was posted to Germany in 1944, she decided to go with him. Vardon began working as an announcer at Radio Luxembourg for the Deutsche Europa Sender (DES). She read out letters written by British prisoners-of-war to their families back home. A German colleague later said of Vardon's attitude that she "simply hated all things English and loved all things German". Vardon was tried at the Old Bailey in February 1946. There she pleaded guilty to the offence of "doing an act likely to assist the enemy" and was given a nine-month prison sentence.

John Lingshaw from Jersey was deported to Oflag VII-C in Laufen in 1942. In August 1943 he volunteered and was employed to teach English to a group of 15 women working in the German propaganda service. After the war he was prosecuted in the Old Bailey and sentenced to five years’ penal servitude.

=== Informers ===
There were a number of cases of anonymous letters sent to the German authorities denouncing fellow islanders for crimes. The reasons for these letters may well be personal rather than acts of collaboration. A few letters were intercepted by the post office, the head of whom steamed open the envelopes and having read the contents, "lost" the letters or delayed them until the accused could be warned. Other letters were not anonymous, as people were attracted by the 20–50 ℛ︁ℳ︁ reward offered to informers by the Germans. On Sark, an islander nailed to a tree a list of everyone with an illegal radio; the local commandant was shocked by this betrayal and refused to act on the information.

People were arrested, imprisoned and subsequently died after being denounced. Louisa Gould was one. She had been sheltering an escaped OT slave worker. She was denounced by two "old biddies", elderly spinsters living next door who sent an anonymous letter. Though not prosecuted after the war, the old ladies were ostracised for the rest of their lives. Informers were hated more than the Germans by the civilian population.

=== Fraternisation ===
Some island women fraternised with the occupying forces. This was frowned upon by the majority of islanders, who gave them the derogatory nickname "Jerry-bags". The extent of "horizontal collaboration" has been exaggerated. Records released by the Public Records Office in 1996 suggest that as many as 900 babies of German fathers were born to Jersey women during the occupation. The Germans themselves estimated their troops had been responsible for fathering 60 to 80 children in the Channel Islands.

Following liberation, the Security Service calculated a figure of 320 illegitimate births in the islands, estimating that of those 180 were due to German fathers. The majority (95 per cent) of women did not have relationships with Germans. The German military authorities themselves tried to prohibit sexual fraternisation in an attempt to reduce the transmission of sexually transmitted diseases. They opened brothels for soldiers and OT workers, staffed mainly by French prostitutes, who were able to earn a good income, under German medical supervision.

There were very few cases of maltreatment of the island women or their children during the war, as there was always the risk of being informed on; however, some were sent postcards saying "you are number X on the list for a haircut". Local girls seen out with Germans after the curfew were arrested for breach of the curfew law. After liberation, attempts to abuse the girls were defused by the police and British soldiers. Some girls were helped to leave the islands as soon as possible. A number of German soldiers returned and married their island sweethearts.

=== Friendships ===
Being civil to each other was expected by both sides. Germans attended islanders' cricket matches, and cinemas were divided with separate areas allocated to Germans and civilians. The German army regularly put on music concerts open to the public. Dances were held, with local ladies invited to attend. A few families became friendly with a specific soldier or OT worker. More than 20 Spanish Republican OT workers stayed and married Jersey women after the war.

The British commander after the liberation heard evidence from many people of collaboration. Talks of "lobster dinners" for Germans were dismissed, as were most other accusations as hearsay, second-hand accounts and "tittle tattle".

== Relief of civilians ==
In August 1944, the German Foreign Ministry made an offer to Britain, through the Swiss Red Cross, that would see the release and evacuation of all Channel Island civilians except for men of military age. The British considered the offer, a memorandum from Winston Churchill stating "Let 'em starve. They can rot at their leisure", it is not clear whether Churchill meant the Germans, or the civilians. In late September the offer was rejected.

In November the Germans instigated a message, after getting agreement with the Bailiff of Jersey, to send to Britain details of the current level of food stocks available to the civilians. The British, with the agreement of the German authorities, then agreed to the supply of Red Cross parcels to civilians. It was very unusual for Red Cross POW parcels to be given to civilians.

The British Joint War Organisation (The British Red Cross and Order of St John) working with the International Committee of the Red Cross organised for the SS Vega to be released from the Lisbon-Marseilles route to bring relief to the Channel Islands. Arriving in Guernsey on 27 December and Jersey on 31 December with 119,792 standard food parcels, salt, soap and medical supplies. Further shiploads of relief supplies would be received monthly until liberation. These parcels saved many civilian lives.

== Liberation ==
Expected for several weeks, at dawn on 9 May 1945 Allied ships were visible from Guernsey. Crowds gathered and a few British troops landing amidst great celebrations, German troops remained in barracks. Some ships went on to Jersey to make an official landing and accept their surrender. Men, vehicles and supplies were pouring ashore from Force 135, by 12 May.

After the initial jubilation, the practical aspects of getting the islands "back to normal" could begin. Initial needs for food, clothing, medicines and basics, even toilet paper, were brought in on landing ships until harbours could be cleared of mines. German soldiers were shipped out on the now empty landing ships. Arms and ammunition were collected and civilians went souvenir hunting; pistols, daggers and medals were very popular. Military equipment was gathered together. Mine clearing took months. Mines are still being found in the islands.

The 20,000 evacuees started to return in batches from July, with 2,000 deportees returning in August. The children, many of whom were very young when they had left five years earlier, hardly knew their relatives and many could no longer speak the local Patois language. Many evacuees felt that they were treated as second class citizens by those who had remained during the occupation, because they had left in 1940. Men and women who had volunteered for the armed services returned when demobbed, mainly in 1946. Relationships would have been difficult at first. Returned children did not understand why islanders did not throw any food away, even eating apple cores.

Accusations and recriminations flew around. Some civilians were angry at the Germans, some at the British for abandoning them and many at other civilians for how they had behaved. Investigators turned up looking for war crimes. The bulk of civilians went looking for work, rebuilding their strength with the improved food and medicines now available and trying to pick up their lives after five years of occupation. There was also a lot of work to do repairing damaged houses.

After spending years in POW camps in the UK, a handful of Germans returned to the islands to marry their sweethearts, as did a number of OT workers, they received mixed reactions from islanders.

=== After liberation ===
The island governments were bankrupt, as they had to pay for the cost of the occupation. They were helped by the British government with a grant. Rationing, as in the UK, would continue until 1955.

A conference at the Home Office decided to define collaboration as:

(a) Women who associated with Germans;
(b) People who entertained Germans or had social contacts with them;
(c) Profiteers;
(d) Information givers;
(e) Persons, whether contractors or workmen, who had carried out work for Germans.

No official action would be taken for groups (a) and (b); social sanction was sufficient. Group (c) would be dealt with through taxation rules, the War Profits Levy (Jersey) Law 1945 and the War Profits Levy (Guernsey) Law 1946. Groups (d) and (e) would come under the provision of the Treason Act, Treachery Act or Defence Regulation 2A. The first two carried mandatory death sentences; the third, penal servitude for life. The British intelligence services in 1945 concluded that the numbers of English in the OT was small and that they were at least under some degree of compulsion.

Following the liberation of 1945, allegations of collaboration with the occupying authorities were investigated. By November 1946, the UK Home Secretary was in a position to inform the House of Commons that most of the allegations lacked substance. Only 12 cases of collaboration were considered for prosecution, but the Director of Public Prosecutions ruled out prosecutions on insufficient grounds. In particular, it was decided that there were no legal grounds for proceeding against those alleged to have informed to the occupying authorities against their fellow citizens. The only trials connected to the occupation of the Channel Islands to be conducted under the Treachery Act 1940 were against individuals from among those who had come to the islands from Britain in 1939–1940 for agricultural work, these included conscientious objectors associated with the Peace Pledge Union and people of Irish extraction.

King George VI and Queen Elizabeth made a special visit by plane to the islands on 7 June 1945. Field Marshall Lord Montgomery visited in May 1947, Winston Churchill was invited twice in 1947 and 1951, but did not travel to the islands.

The bailiffs of each island were cleared of every accusation of being "Quislings" and collaborators. Both were given knighthoods for patriotic service in 1945. A list of other people were also honoured with knighthoods, CBE, OBE or BEM. Only those who lived under occupation can fully appreciate those five long years.

The passing of laws during the occupation needed to be legalised; in Jersey 46 laws were retroactively given Royal Assent after Liberation through the adoption of the Confirmation of Laws (Jersey) Law 1945.

Germans were investigated, particularly regarding the deportations; the outcome concluding that no war crimes had been committed in Jersey, Guernsey or Sark. As regards Alderney however, a court case was recommended over the ill treatment and killing of the OT slave workers there. No trial ever took place in Britain or Russia; two OT overseers were however tried in France and sentenced to many years of imprisonment.

Deaths during the occupation:

- German forces: about 550
- OT workers: over 700 (500 graves and 200 drowned when a ship was sunk)
- Allied forces: about 550 (504 from the sinking of HMS Charybdis and HMS Limbourne)
- Civilians: about 150, mainly air raids, deportees and in prisons (excludes Island deaths from malnutrition and the cold)

A higher percentage of civilians died in the islands per head of pre-war population than in the UK.

From the people who had left the Islands in 1939/40 and been evacuated in 1940, 10,418 islanders served with Allied forces.

- Jersey citizens: of 5,978 who served, 516 died
- Guernsey citizens: of 4,011 who served, 252 died
- Alderney citizens: of 204 who served, 25 died
- Sark citizens: of 27 who served, one died

A higher percentage of serving people from the islands died per head of pre-war population than in the UK.

== See also ==
- German occupation of the Channel Islands
- Deportations from the German-occupied Channel Islands
- Resistance in the German-occupied Channel Islands
- German fortification of Guernsey
- Sark during the German occupation of the Channel Islands
