= Cecil Stanley Harrison =

Bailiff of Jersey
- In office 1961–1962
- Preceded by: Alexander Coutanche, Baron Coutanche
- Succeeded by: Robert Le Masurier

Personal details
- Born: 17 November 1902 Jersey
- Died: 14 April 1962 (aged 59)
- Resting place: Parish Church of Saint Clement, Jersey
- Spouse: Evelyn Jeannie Reid
- Children: Sally Le Brocq (1938-)

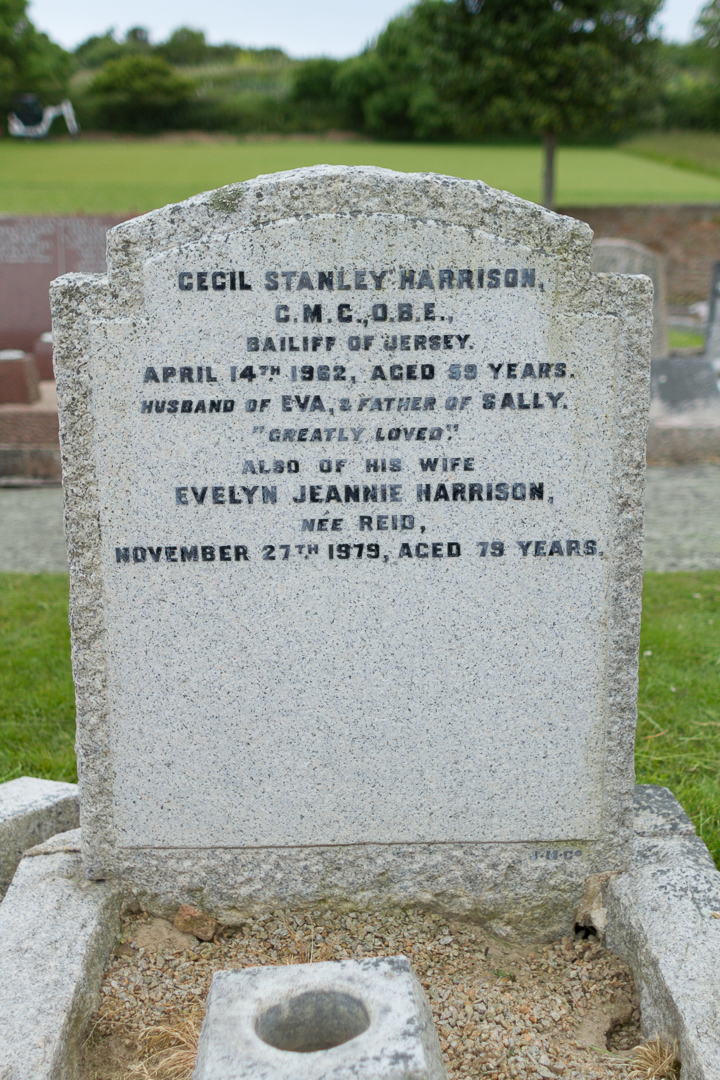
Harrison's gravestone in St Clement's churchyard, Jersey

Cecil Stanley Harrison, CMG OBE (17 November 1902 – 14 April 1962) was Bailiff of Jersey from 1961 to 1962.

== Portrait ==
The artist Herbert James Gunn created a portrait of Harrison in 1964. The painting is located in Jersey's Royal Court.
