= Victor Carey =

Guernésiais bailiff

Sir Victor Gosselin Carey
- Born: 2 July 1871; Guernsey, Channel Islands
- Died: 28 June 1957 (aged 85); Guernsey, Channel Islands

Bailiff of Guernsey
- In office 1935–1946
- Preceded by: Arthur William Bell
- Succeeded by: Ambrose Sherwill

Sir Victor Gosselin Carey (2 July 1871 – 28 June 1957) was a resident of Guernsey on the Channel Islands. He held the post of Bailiff of Guernsey from 1935 to 1946. Carey was a leading member of one of Guernsey's oldest families. In 1935, when incumbent Baliff Arthur William Bell died, Carey, who had been Receiver General from 1912 to 1935, replaced him because Procurer Ambrose Sherwill, to whom the role would have normally fallen, had been in office only a few weeks.

Carey is controversial for his complicity in the deportations of three Jews, who were subsequently murdered in Auschwitz, living in Guernsey during the German occupation of the Channel Islands. Carey assisted the Germans by reporting a list of names of Jews on the island, which was drawn up by police chief William Sculpher.

== Pre war ==
He was born 2 July 1871 in Guernsey, son of de Vic Francis Carey and Harriet Mary Gosselin. He was educated at Elizabeth College 1880–83, Marlborough College 1885–87, and Caen University, France 1895–97, where he studied law. He married Adelaide Eleanor Jeffreys on 23 March 1899.

From 1935 until the Germans landed at Guernsey airport, he fulfilled the duties of Bailiff, both as head of the Courts of Guernsey and as head of the States of Guernsey. The civil authorities of Guernsey, represented by their Bailiff, the elected members of the island parliaments, civil servants and emergency services, had of necessity to work in a professional manner with the occupiers for the benefit of the civil population. They had been ordered to do this by the Secretary of State in letters dated 19 June 1940.

The Bailiff oversaw the evacuation of 17,000 children and adults to England in June 1940.

== German Occupation ==
During the Nazi German occupation of the Channel Islands, which began on 30 June 1940, German authorities seized control of the Bailiwick. Age 69 at the beginning of the Occupation, Carey was considered too old to be able to function as the executive of the Island Authorities on his own. Therefore, in contrast to the situation in Jersey, which had a 48 year old Bailiff, Alexander Coutanche, the Bailiff of Guernsey's powers were actually reduced during the Occupation as day-to-day running of Island affairs became the responsibility of a Controlling Committee made up of a small number of members of the States of Guernsey, chaired at first by Ambrose Sherwill, and after Sherwill's imprisonment for aiding British soldiers trapped on the Island, by Jurat John Leale.

The Bailiff remained a higher authority, entering into the political fray only when the actions of the Controlling Committee had yielded an unsatisfactory outcome. Carey and the Controlling Committee cooperated with the German commander in the interest of the civil population under their care.

The census of islanders the Germans ordered in autumn 1941, combined with the pre-war aliens registration records, the police records of enemy aliens who had been detained in May/June 1940 combined with the German requirement for people of the Jewish faith to register, gave the Germans the names of most of the Jews in Guernsey and the nearby island of Sark. Three Jews were deported to German-occupied France in April 1942, where they took jobs and from where, several months later they were picked up in a roundup of French Jews and were eventually killed in Auschwitz-Birkenau. After the war a British Military Intelligence report said "when the Germans proposed to put their anti-Jewish measures into force, no protest whatever was raised by any of the Guernsey officials and they hastened to give the Germans every assistance".

A private memorandum from a senior judge, Lord Justice du Parcq, to the Home Secretary, James Chuter-Ede, in 1945 comments on allegations of collaboration within the Jersey and Guernsey administrations. He specifies the Channel Island governments' collaboration in the deportation of 2,000 English and Jews to camps in 1942. 'I think that a strong case can be made . . . that the authorities ought to have refused to give any assistance in the performance of this violation of international law. I have had some communication with the War Crimes Commission on the subject, and I know that the commission has recommended the prosecution of the Germans responsible . . . I should feel happier if I thought a strong line had been taken.'

Of the Bailiff of Guernsey, Victor Carey, he says: 'There is strong feeling in responsible quarters in Guernsey against the Bailiff by reason of the orders issued by him. Some at least were shocked by the use of the words 'enemy forces' to describe His Majesty's and Allied Forces, and by the promise of a pounds 25 reward to any informer against a person writing the V sign (symbol of resistance) or other words calculated to offend the German authorities. This condemnation was made without understanding that people undertaking such petty offences risked not only long imprisonment for themselves, but innocent islanders in the area it was committed, who the Germans had threatened with severe punishment and on occasions enforced collective punishments. The lack of understanding was compounded by not realising that laws were passed by the States of Guernsey, or the Controlling Committee, not by the Bailiff.

A few published works have criticised his role in the government of the Bailiwick during this period. This opinion is in the minority, on the whole he remains a figure of considerable repute in Guernsey itself.

The island governments, headed by their bailiffs, Victor Carey in Guernsey and Alexander Coutanche in Jersey, had been ordered by the British Government to remain on their islands to maintain law and order and to do what they could for the civilians. This put them under a duty of care. When the lieutenant governors, who were the King's representatives on each island, departed on 21 June 1940, their powers and duties were vested in the bailiffs, namely to protect the islands and their population, taking on the duties of the Lieutenant Governors added a further duty of care.

However, for the part of the island's population that was Jewish this ‘duty of care’ was abrogated by the ‘Third Order’ registered in the Royal Courts of Guernsey on 17 June 1941. This law prohibited all persons deemed Jews from carrying on any kind of business on the island, without compensation, adding further that no Jew was to be engaged as a ‘higher official or as an employee who comes into contact with customers’ and Jewish employees should ‘be dismissed and replaced by non-Jewish employees’.

== Post-war ==
Theobald Mathew, the Director of Public Prosecutions, and MI5’s Joseph Richmond Stopford agreed in July 1945 that the idea of awarding decorations to the Channel Island bailiffs was “rashly conceived.” When Carey's name was submitted for honours to Prime Minister Clement Attlee in October 1945, Attlee asked Home Secretary Chuter Ede to explain the discrepancies between the negative Mathew and Stopford report and Ede's positive view. Ede explained that his investigations concluded that Mathews found the Channel Island authorities had “behaved well, animated by the sole desire to act as a buffer”, which contradicts Mathew's actual comments, and that the newly appointed Channel Island Lieutenant Governors confirmed that both bailiffs deserved commendation. Neither Jersey's Lieutenant Governor Arthur Edward Grasett nor Guernsey's Lieutenant Governor Philip Neame were present in the Channel Islands during the occupation.

Carey's grandson later remarked that once the war was over, "the government didn't know whether to hang my grandfather for treason or knight him." The bailiffs of both Jersey and Guernsey were cleared of every accusation of being "Quislings" and collaborators. Both were given knighthoods for patriotic service in 1945. A list of other people were also honoured with knighthoods, CBE, OBE or BEM.

Victor Gosselin Carey was given a knighthood in December 1945.

In 1946 Sir Victor Carey, now aged 75, retired as Bailiff and Ambrose Sherwill was appointed in his stead. Sir Victor died on 28 June 1957, aged 85.

== See also ==
- German occupation of the Channel Islands

Legal offices
Preceded by Arthur William Bell	Bailiff of Guernsey; 1935–1946	Succeeded by Sir Ambrose Sherwill
