= John Leale =

The Reverend Sir John Leale (14 January 1892 – 22 July 1969) was a Guernsey Jurat and Methodist minister, who assumed the role as President of the States of Guernsey Controlling Committee during the occupation of the Guernsey by Nazi Germany (1940–1945).

== Biography ==
Leale was born at Vale, Guernsey, in 1892 and was ordained in 1918, at the Methodist Conference in Manchester.

After his predecessor, Ambrose Sherwill, was deported to Nazi prisons on the Continent in 1940, Leale assumed his role at the head of the executive committee. He and Victor Carey, Bailiff of Guernsey from 1935 to 1946, have attracted considerable criticism for emphasising passive collaboration and opposing acts of resistance. However, in some instances, Leale took a stand against the Germans, if he considered that they were in violation of the Hague Convention, to which (in Leale's words) the controlling committee had "wed" itself.

Opponents of Leales' elevation to knighthood, on 11 December 1945, have described him as a traitor. Leale has been criticised as a collaborator and for providing the names of Jews to the Nazis; three women from the island were subsequently murdered at the Auschwitz concentration camp.

An avenue and a building on Guernsey are named after him.
