= Ambrose Sherwill =

Sir Ambrose Sherwill
- Born: 12 February 1890; Guernsey, Channel Islands
- Died: 25 September 1968 (aged 78); Alderney, Channel Islands

Bailiff of Guernsey
- In office 1946–1959
- Preceded by: Victor Carey
- Succeeded by: William Arnold

Sir Ambrose James Sherwill KBE MC (12 February 1890 – 25 September 1968) was Bailiff of Guernsey from 1946 to 1959. In the early months of World War II, he helped in the administration of the Channel Islands when they were occupied by the Germans.

== Early life ==
Educated in Guernsey and in Cherbourg he worked for a lawyer in Guernsey before passing the qualification of Licencié en Droit at Caen University (necessary to practice law in Guernsey) in 1914, just before the war broke out.

Although a member of the Royal Guernsey Militia, Sherwill volunteered as a dispatch rider but was called up as an air mechanic in the Royal Navy Air Service Armoured Car Division and served as a petty officer until he was commissioned into The Buffs in 1916. Sherwill was awarded the Military Cross (MC) for services at the battle of Messines in 1917, where he was wounded, being promoted to Lieutenant shortly afterwards. He received a second bad wound in 1918, and used the recovery time to continue with his law studies. On demobilisation in 1919 he moved to England to pass the English Bar exams before returning to Guernsey in May 1920 to apply for admittance to the Bar as an Advocate of the Royal Court.

His military service continued with the Royal Guernsey Militia being appointed Lieutenant in 1921, Captain in 1922 and Major in 1925 before retiring in 1928 when the militia was scaled back.

Standing for election to the States of Guernsey, he served as a Deputy from 1921 to 1926 whilst continuing to practice law. In 1935 Sherwill became His Majesty's Attorney General (with the duties of public prosecutor), having to give up private practice and accept the reduced income associated with public office.

== World War II ==
During World War II, he was President of the Controlling Committee during the German occupation of the Channel Islands, responsible for the running of the Island government and the main contact for the German authorities, reporting only to the elderly Bailiff, Victor Carey, until Sherwill was deported to Cherche-Midi Prison for his part in the Nicolle and Symes affair. Jurat John Leale took over his responsibilities as president.

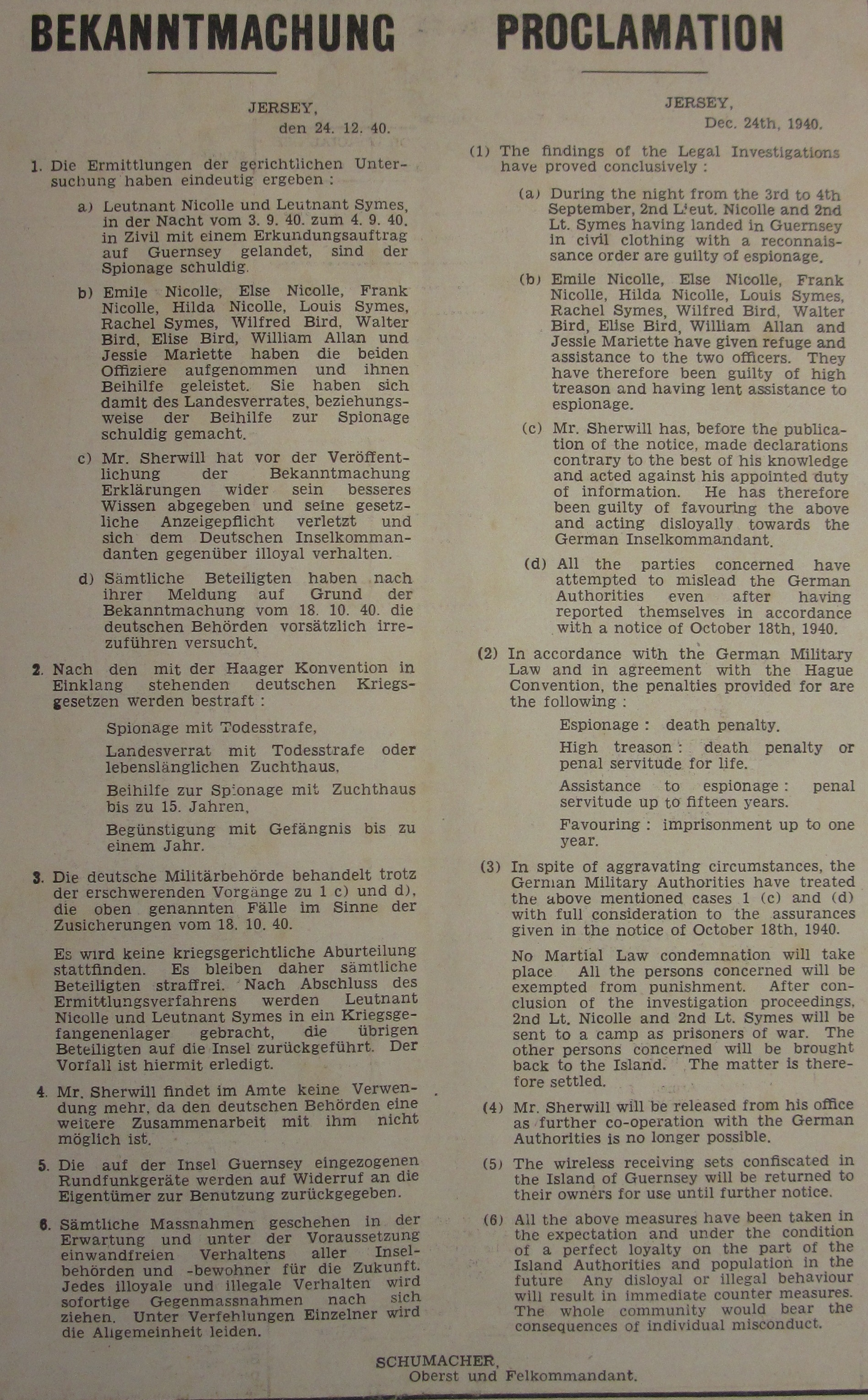
German proclamation of measures against Sherwill, Nicolle, Symes and others following Operation Ambassador

Sherwill's patriotism was confirmed, when at great personal risk he doctored Guernsey militia uniforms to make them appear to be British Army uniforms, in order that Nicolle and Symes would be treated as soldiers, rather than spies (as undercover operatives were routinely shot by both sides as part of protocol.)

Sentenced to two months in prison, taken to France in a Junkers Ju 52, he spent November and December 1940 in several prisons including 45 days in the very unpleasant Cherche-Midi Prison in Paris. On his return he was informed he would no longer be allowed any contact with the German authorities. This was lifted for the winter of 1942–3 when he again practised as Attorney General.

He conducted himself with distinction at the Laufen Internment Camp to which he was eventually deported in February 1943, becoming head of the British forces/citizens at the camp in June 1943. Laufen was a chateau housing single men, mainly from the Channel Islands as well as some "American" men, who had been in Europe when America entered the war. Liberation came on 4 May 1945 with the internees being flown to England in June.

=== Controversy ===
Sherwill has been variously accused of excessively cordial relations with the German occupying troops, and acquiescing without due resistance to the Feldkommandant. Most notable perhaps is the episode of August 1940, when Sherwill, with the professed intention of reassuring those evacuated Guernsey citizens who anxiously awaited news of their loved ones who had chosen to remain on the Island, recorded a broadcast for Radio Bremen assuring of the 'kindly' treatment of islanders at the hands of the German troops. No doubt Sherwill's intentions were noble, but his naivety was nonetheless exploited by the German propaganda machine in their desire to show that the realities of German occupation were far removed from the bleak picture propagated by British communiqués and propaganda.

=== Post 1945 ===
He returned to Guernsey after the War, and was made a Commander of the Order of the British Empire in December 1945. He served as Bailiff of Guernsey between 1946 and 1959. He was knighted, when made a Knight Commander in 1949. In 1960, he retired to Alderney, then later moved to Guernsey with his wife to live with his son and daughter-in-law, Rollo and Jenny Sherwill. He died at his son's home on 25 September 1968 at the age of 78.

Legal offices
Preceded by Sir Victor Carey	Bailiff of Guernsey; 1946–1959	Succeeded by Sir William Arnold
