= Operation Constellation =

Operation Constellation was the name of one of a number of missions proposed by Vice Admiral Lord Louis Mountbatten in 1943 to take back the Channel Islands from German occupation during World War II. It was never mounted. The other missions were Operation Condor, Operation Concertina, and Operation Coverlet.

== Background ==
Between 1940 and 1945, the Channel Islands were the only British territory to come under Nazi occupation. On these islands were entrenched almost 40,000 German soldiers, sailors and airmen, behind fortifications that had consumed more than 10% of the concrete used in the Atlantic Wall, which stretched from Norway to the Pyrenees.

== Proposal ==
In 1943, British Chief of Combined Operations, Vice-Admiral Lord Louis Mountbatten proposed Operation Constellation, an offensive against the Channel Islands, Operation Concertina, an offensive against Alderney, Operation Coverlet, the offensive against Guernsey, and Operation Condor, the offensive against Jersey. He suggested that:

"There is no doubt that the enemy has fully appreciated the value of the Channel Islands, and the potential threat those islands would offer if re-occupied by our forces"

In 1941, the Channel Islands, captured without opposition in July 1940 were turned into fortresses, never to be surrendered. These developments had been observed by Mountbatten through aerial reconnaissance. Mountbatten commented:

"Each island is a veritable fortress, the assault against which cannot be contemplated unless the defences are neutralised, or reduced to a very considerable extent by prior action."

"Prior action" meant either naval bombardment or aerial bombing. Although most defences were on or near the coast, the inaccuracies of bombing or shelling had the potential to pulverise two thirds of Guernsey's land surface, and at least half of Jersey's. Because of the likely substantial civilian casualties from this bombardment, the extreme difficulty and likely casualties of invasion even after heavy bombardment, and the very limited use of the islands for the Allies, the operations were shelved.

The German garrison of the islands was by-passed with Operation Overlord, the liberation of mainland Europe, and eventually surrendered as part of the general German surrender on 9 May 1945, a day later than the rest of Europe and in the case of Alderney, on 16 May 1945.

== See also ==
- German occupation of the Channel Islands
