= Alexander Coutanche, Baron Coutanche =

The Right Honourable The Lord Coutanche
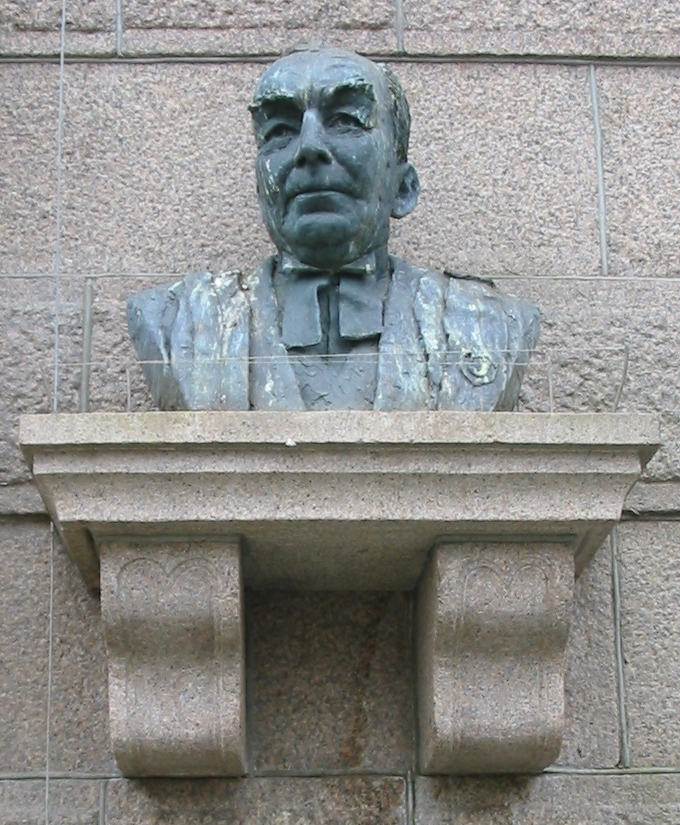
- A bust of Lord Coutanche is sited on the side of the States Building in Saint Helier below the balcony from which he announced the Liberation of Jersey on 8 May 1945

Bailiff of Jersey
- In office 1935–1962
- Preceded by: Charles de Carteret
- Succeeded by: Cecil Stanley Harrison

Personal details
- Born: Alexander Moncrieff Coutanche; 9 May 1892 Saint Saviour, Jersey
- Died: 18 December 1973 (aged 81) Saint Brélade, Jersey
- Resting place: Saint Brélade, Jersey

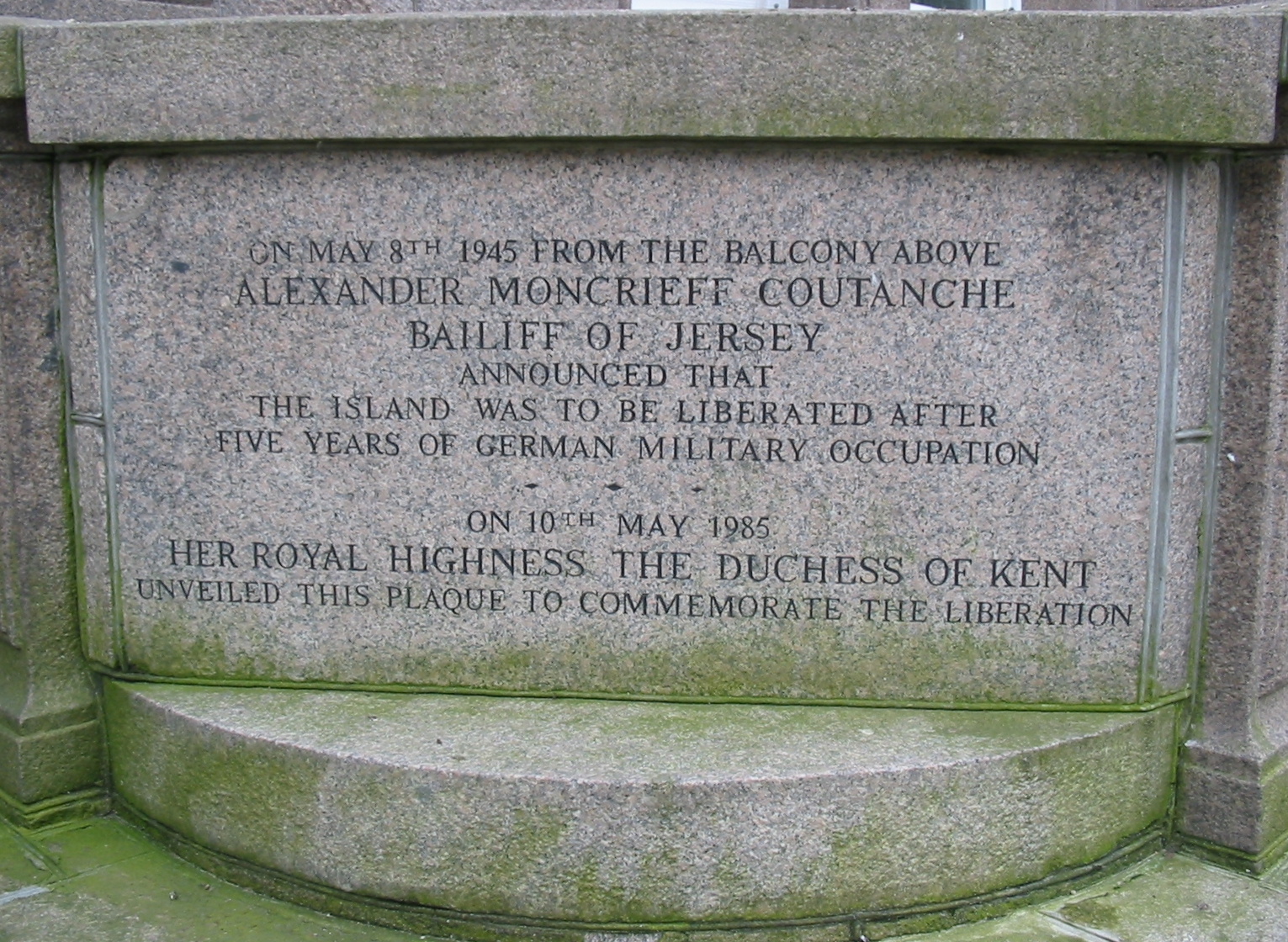
On May 8th 1945 from the balcony above Alexander Moncrieff Coutanche Bailiff of Jersey announced that the Island was to be liberated after five years of German military occupation

Alexander Moncrieff Coutanche, Baron Coutanche (9 May 1892 – 18 December 1973), known as Sir Alexander Coutanche from 1946 until 1961, was a former Bailiff of Jersey and member of the House of Lords in the United Kingdom.

== Early life and education ==
Coutanche was born in Saint Saviour, Jersey; the younger son and third child to Adolphus Arnold Coutanche (1856–1921) and Jane Alexandrina Finlayson (1867-1909). He was educated at Jersey High School and Victoria College before going to study law at the University of Caen. He then attended Carlisle and Gregson's London Academy with the intention of entering the Indian Civil Service. However, although he passed the entrance examination for the Indian Civil Service, he was rejected on health grounds due to the discovery of a systolic heart murmur.

== Early career ==
Having studied law before attempting to enter the civil service, Coutanche entered the chambers of John Beaumont at the Middle Temple in 1912. He aimed to practise at the Chancery bar, but was instead called to the Jersey bar in 1913. Upon the outbreak of the First World War in 1914, Coutanche served as an assistant to a government secretary in Jersey. He was ineligible to join the Inns of Court regiment due to his previously discovered heart murmur. Therefore, he went to work at a munitions factory, rising from a worker through to management level. He was called to the English bar in 1915.

In 1917, he volunteered for work with the War Claims Commission and was posted to Belgium with the rank of lieutenant. During his time in Belgium, he won the Belgian Croix de Guerre and was appointed chevalier of the Order of the Crown (Belgium). He left the army in 1920 with the rank of captain. He returned to his chambers in London, but then had to return to work at the Jersey chambers due to the illness of his father.

He was elected a Deputy of Saint Helier in 1922, and married Ruth Sophia Joan Gore in 1924.

== Attorney-General and Bailiff of Jersey ==
In 1925, Coutanche was appointed Solicitor-General, and went on to reform the department of the law officers and reorganised the States Greffe of the States of Jersey. He was promoted to Attorney-General in 1931. In 1935, the bailiff of Jersey, Charles de Carteret, retired. Coutanche was promoted to this office. As the last bailiff appointed before the passage of a law on the Bailiff in 1936, he was the last bailiff appointed for life and the last under the sole prerogative of the Crown without the obligation to consult the States of Jersey.

As the bailiff of Jersey also fulfills the function of Deputy Governor, Coutanche took on the additional role of Governor of Jersey when the island was demilitarised in 1940 by King George VI.

== During the German Occupation of Jersey 1940–1945 ==
The UK Home Office instructed the Lieutenant-Governor of Jersey that the Bailiff of Jersey should take over his responsibilities, and that the Bailiff and Crown Officers should remain at their posts. The Lieutenant-Governor discussed with the Bailiff the matter of being required to carry on administration under German orders. Coutanche considered that this would be contrary to his oath of allegiance, but he was instructed otherwise.

The States of Jersey passed the Defence (Transfer of Powers) (Jersey) Regulation 1940 on 27 June 1940 to amalgamate the various executive committees into 8 departments each under the presidency of a States Member. The presidents along with the Crown Officers made up the Superior Council under the presidency of the Bailiff.

Coutanche's remarks to Professor Karl Heinz Pfeffer, head of the Great Britain department at the Institute for Foreign Affairs (Berlin), during the latter's visit to Jersey in 1941 were reported by Pfeffer. Coutanche's explanation of "decent" co-existence between Jewish and Christian traditions and people in Jersey can, according to Sanders, be interpreted as disapproval of anti-Jewish policy. Coutanche refused to ratify the registration of the eighth order requiring the wearing of a yellow star as a "measure too far".

== After the Liberation ==
He was knighted in 1946. He was made a life peer in the Birthday Honours of 1961 taking the title of Baron Coutanche, of St Brelade in the Island of Jersey and of the City of Westminster. He retired as bailiff in 1961. During the period when he was simultaneously a member of the legislatures of Jersey and the United Kingdom he sat as a crossbencher in the House of Lords; upon his retirement as bailiff he took the Conservative whip.

He was an honorary Bencher of the Middle Temple and Doctor of Laws of the University of Caen.

== Arms ==
Coat of arms of Alexander Coutanche, Baron Coutanche
Crest A hurt charged with a mitre Or. Escutcheon Azure within two bars Argent between six bezants a cross crosslet fitchée Or. Supporters Dexter a wolf rampant Argent collared Gules, sinister a lion rampant Gules armed and langued Azure. Motto Constantia Justitia Et Fidelitas (Constancy, Justice and Fidelity)
