= Oflag VII-C =

World War II German prisoner-of-war camp

Oflag VII-C / Ilag VII
- Laufen, Germany
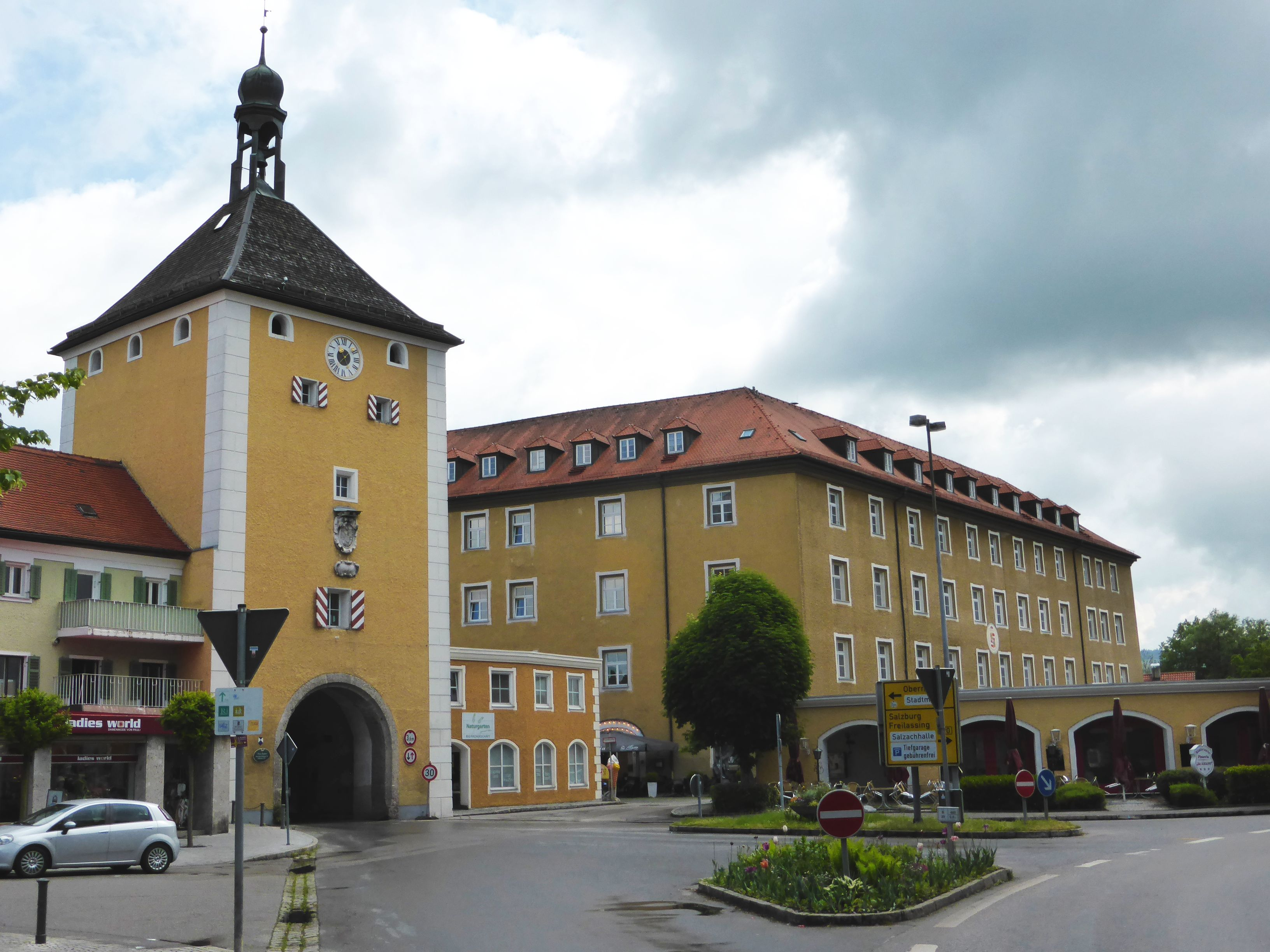
- Laufen Castle, which housed the camp

Site information
- Type: Prisoner-of-war camp Internment camp
- Controlled by: Nazi Germany

Location
- Laufen, Germany (pre-war borders, 1937)
- Coordinates: 47.93861°N 12.93676°E

Site history
- In use: 1940-1945
- Battles/wars: World War II

Garrison information
- Occupants: British POWs; British and U.S. internees

Oflag VII-C was a World War II German prisoner-of-war camp for officers located in Laufen Castle, in Laufen in south-eastern Bavaria from 1940 to 1942. Most of the prisoners were British officers captured during the Battle of France in 1940. To relieve overcrowding, some of the officers were transferred to Oflag VII-C/Z in Tittmoning Castle. The Oflag existed only for a short time. In early 1942 all the officers were transferred to Oflag VII-B in Eichstätt.

The castle was then used as an Internment Camp Ilag VII for men from the British Channel Islands of Jersey and Guernsey until the camp was liberated in May 1945. Previously, in September 1944, after lengthy negotiations, 125 elderly and sick prisoners were repatriated to Great Britain via Sweden. In April 1944 the count of internees in Laufen included 459 British internees (417 Channel Islanders) and 120 American civilians who had been trapped in Europe when war was suddenly declared in December 1941. Even though the camp housed civilians, it continued to be operated by the German Army. The camp was liberated by the U.S. 3rd Army on 5 May 1945.

Eight Channel Island internees died in Laufen camp during the period of internment.

== Notable inmates ==
- John Lingshaw, Channel Islander internee and subsequent German collaborator.
- Josef Nassy, a black expatriate artist of Jewish descent, holding a US passport who created a visual diary of life in the camp.
- Captain Pat Reid, arrived 5 June 1940, escaped 5 September 1940, later British escape officer at Colditz.
- Ambrose Sherwill, President of the Controlling Committee in Guernsey, who became British Camp Senior.
- Jean-Claude Miller, youngest inmate (18 years old), interned early December 1942 with his father John Vassar Miller, because they were Americans trapped in Europe when war was declared.
- Lieutenant J.E.M. ‘Jimmy’ Atkinson of the 7th Battalion The Argyll and Sutherland Highlanders who wrote the Scottish country dance, the Reel of the 51st Highland Division whilst in the camp.
- Desmond Llewelyn, actor, known for playing Q in 17 James Bond films
- John Buxton, scholar, university teacher, poet, and ornithologist.

== See also ==
- List of prisoner-of-war camps in Germany
- Deportations from the German-occupied Channel Islands
- Oflag VII-D in Tittmoning
