= Deportations from the German-occupied Channel Islands =

1942 deportation

On direct instructions from Adolf Hitler, Nazi German forces deported and interned 2,300 Channel Islands civilian residents. The stated reason was retaliation for internment of German citizens in Persia by the British Government.

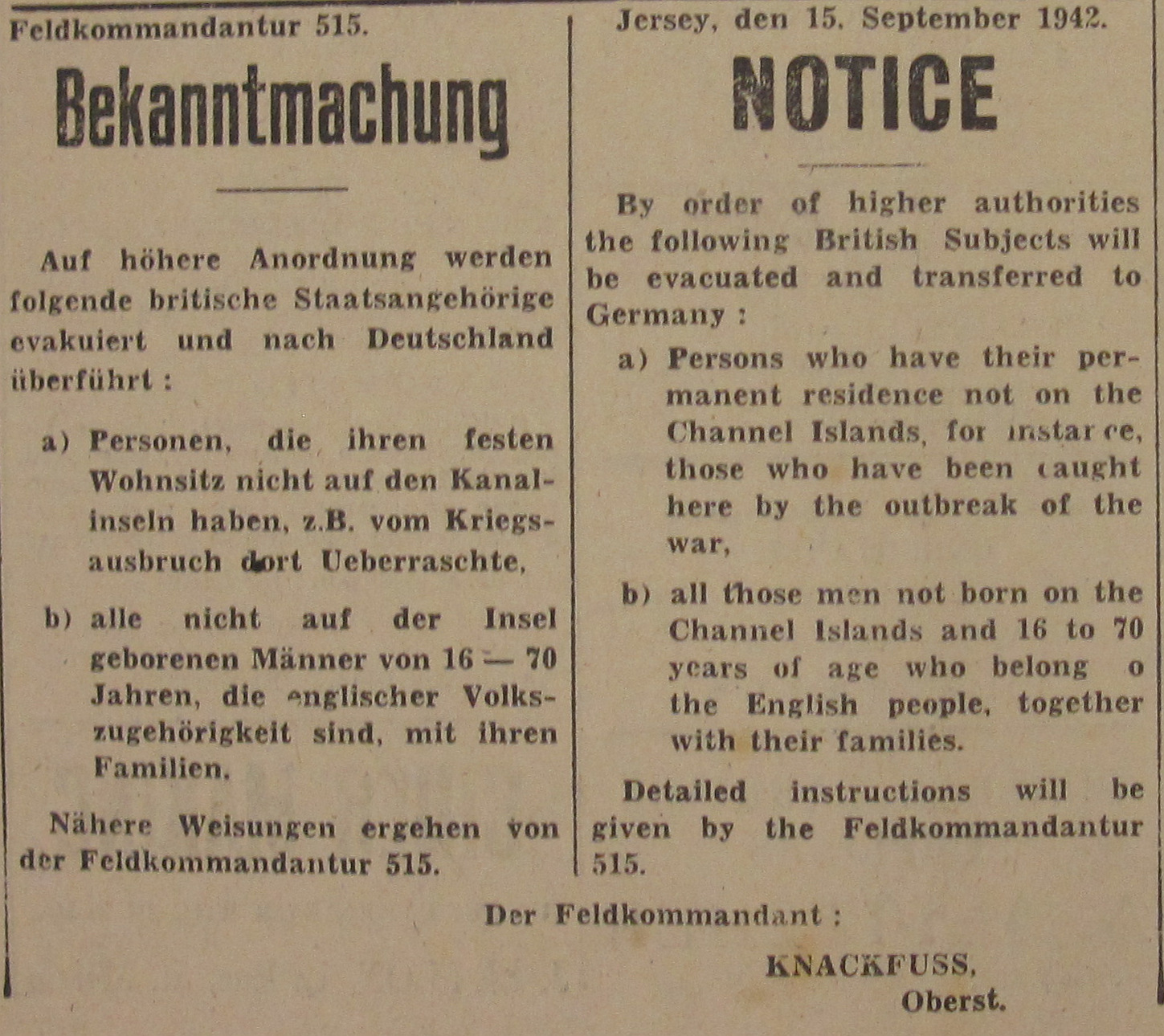
Bekanntmachung 1942 deportation Jersey

== Prelude ==
The Channel Islands, comprising the Bailiwick of Jersey and Bailiwick of Guernsey, which also comprised Alderney and Sark, fell under German control on 30 June 1940.

Prior to this, the lightning Blitzkrieg resulting in the fall of France gave the British government and the island governments just enough time to evacuate those who were willing to leave the islands immediately. Approximately 25,000 left, while 66,000 remained. There were 41,101 left in Jersey, 24,429 in Guernsey and 470 in Sark, with just 18 in Alderney.

The British Government had decided on 15 June to demilitarise and abandon the Channel Islands, so all military personnel, weapons and equipment had been taken to England.

Through the second half of 1940 and into 1941, the islanders gradually settled into a "working relationship with the German occupiers". A small number of people, who had access to boats, decided to flee the islands, some dying in the attempt.

== Motivation ==
In June 1941, Persia, now called Iran, was a neutral country with Germany as its largest trade partner. The Soviet Union was on its northern border. Britain had recently encamped in Iraq to the west, following an anti-British coup by Nazi sympathisers. On 22 June, Operation Barbarossa, the invasion of Soviet territory started.

Worried about the large expat German community in Iran undertaking espionage and subversion activities, on 19 July a joint Soviet/British demand was made to Persia to expel all German citizens. It was rejected on 29 July and renewed on 16 August, this time in coordination with the Americans at a conference on 9–12 August 1941. Persia eventually agreed to the demand, but by 25 August, Anglo-Soviet forces invaded the country.

In September, the German legation and women and children from the expat community were permitted to travel to Europe, as were the other Axis legations. German men of fighting age (18-45) were rounded up, most preferring British to Soviet control. A few went into Soviet hands and were shipped to Siberia. The British then separated out Jewish Germans who could remain in Persia. The remaining men were sent to India for internment, some ended up in camps in Australia.

== German reaction ==
Hitler was furious, albeit hypocritical, to complain of an invasion of a neutral country and the internment of German men. His immediate reaction was to find out what reprisals were possible.

The German Foreign Office response was that British people in the Channel Islands were effectively interned as they could not leave without permission. A rough estimate from Jersey indicated about 2,000 men in the Island had been born in the United Kingdom. This was short of the 8,000 that were needed if a ratio of 10:1 was to be applied. More accurate lists of men were demanded, including a list of Persian citizens. The demand for lists was expanded to include women and children. By 10 November, lists were submitted by the Island authorities:

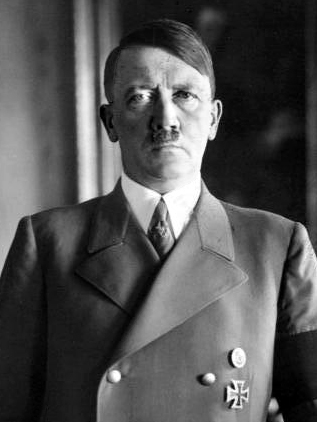
Adolf Hitler

1941 Deportation lists
Sex and age	Jersey	Guernsey	Total
Men 18-45	1,305	432	1,737
Men 46-60	700	359	1,039
Men over 60	728	444	1,172
Women 18+	2,391	1,525	3,916
Children <18	402	70	472
Total	5,526	2,830	8,356

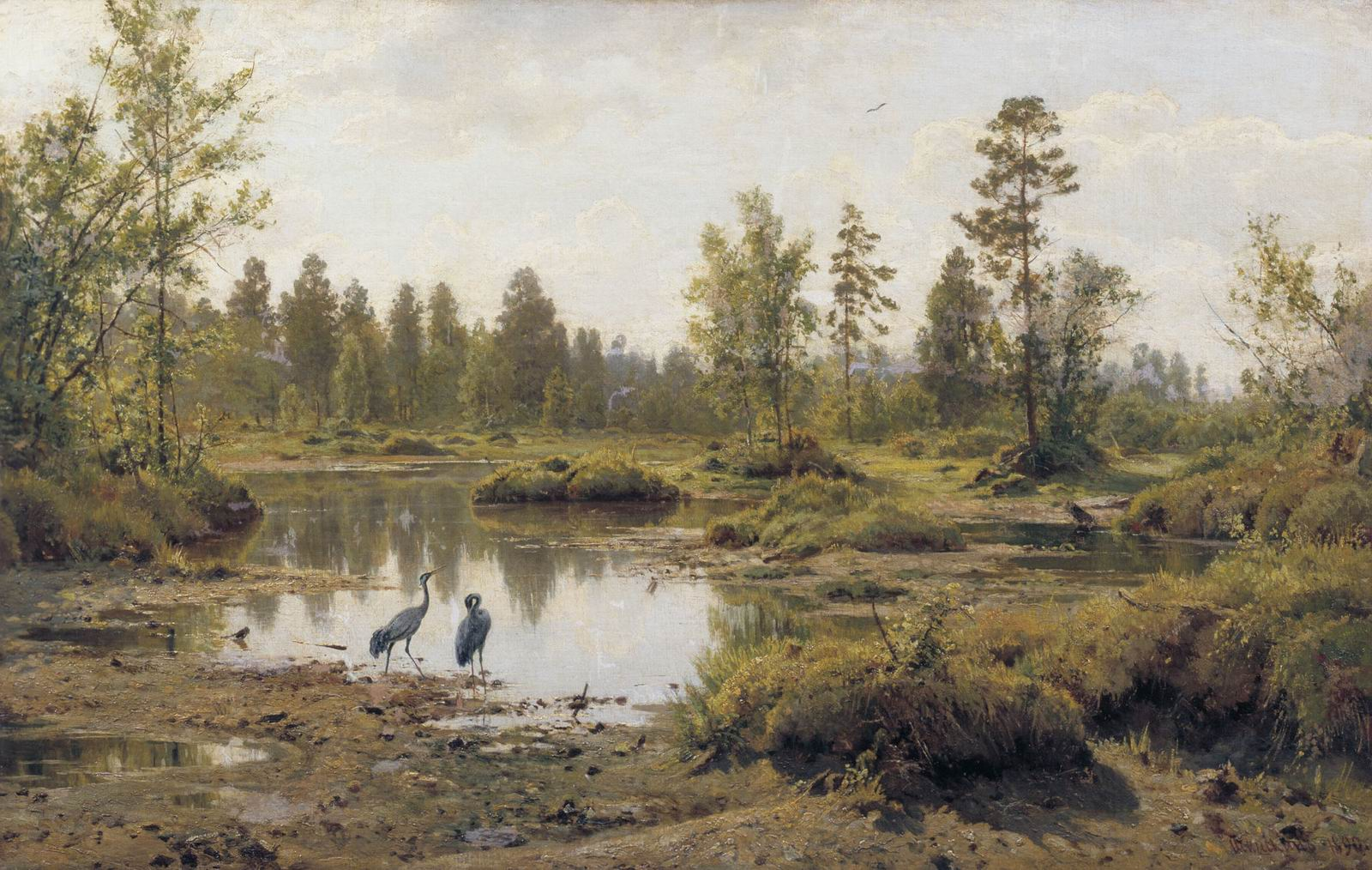
Pripet Marshes -104,000 square miles (269,400 km^{2}) surrounding the sandy lowlands of the dense network of rivers and rivulets forming on both sides of the Pripyat River, one of the main tributaries of the Dnieper.

German officials tried several diplomatic routes to get the Germans in Persia released, trading them for British trapped in Sweden and threatening to intern British civilians, including those in the Channel Islands. Hitler decided to hold them in the Pripet Marshes, with a ratio of 10 British for each German interned. Britain's response was to inform the Germans that any action against civilians in the Channel Islands would be against the Hague convention. The German military (the Wehrmacht) was unhappy with the use of the Pripet Marshes, an operational area where they did not want Allied officials to visit. The Foreign Ministry worried that a proposal to confiscate property of internees could be repeated against German internees in Britain.

As final figures of Iranian Germans became known, the desired punitive ratio of 10:1 meant that 5,000 deportees had to be found. However, there were fewer than 2,000 men in the age group of 18-45. By 11 November, following the census undertaken in the Islands in August 1941, the Germans knew there were 8,166 Channel Island citizens born in the United Kingdom and had identified the men, and possibly women, who could be deported with their property confiscated and redistributed. A camp near Cologne had been prepared and shipping readied to transport 6,000.

This order to the Wehrmacht, which listed the people, was put aside when the Fuhrer's order of 20 October 1941 about fortifying the Island mentioned that a further order would give deportation instructions and no further order was received.

=== September 1942 ===
A Swiss attempt to get an exchange of injured soldiers and civilians resulted in Hitler being reminded of the British civilians. Discovering that his orders had not been complied with, he reissued the order. In the Islands, everything moved very quickly. The order arrived in Jersey on 15 September, the same day a meeting was held with the Bailiff and Parish officials, and a notice appeared in the local paper. Because the island authorities refused to serve the notices, soldiers required parish officials to show them where to go, and served the deportation orders on the first batch of people that evening.

People were told that luggage was limited to what they could carry. No time was allowed to arrange personal or business affairs. Valuables were deposited in banks and pets given away or killed. By special licence, several women married their local fiancés that day, thus escaping deportation. Others attempted suicide, and some were successful.

Some bargaining took place to allow a few people to remain and others to take their places. Most church ministers were English, so a deal was agreed to allow enough of them to remain to continue their services. People who were useful to the German government for their work they were doing were also spared, as were some sick and aged.

=== Ships and trains ===
Hoping to ship out 1,200 people on 16 December, the Germans were disappointed when only 280 men women and children left Jersey on the first ship. The streets were lined with people, crying and waving. The Island gave them food to take with them. The German sailors put them into life jackets. Many ex-servicemen proudly wore their medals. As the ship sailed, patriotic songs were sung.

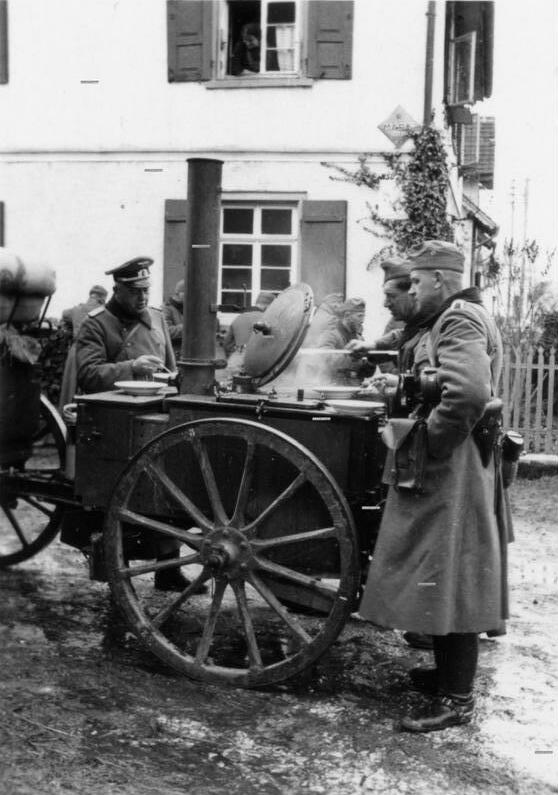
German field kitchen

Two days later, several ships in Jersey were ready and 600 more people were ordered to report. One ship was rejected by the Island authorities as it had just discharged a load of coal and was filthy, so only 346 people sailed. Those who were not shipped out returned to their houses to await the next ship, some finding that their houses had been stripped bare in their absence. The crowds attending to wave goodbye were larger than before and their patriotic singing angered the Germans, who responded with violence and arrests.

Ships left Guernsey on 26 and 27 September with 825 deportees, including 9 from Sark. Guernsey borrowed two field kitchens from the Germans and cooked the “evacuees”, as the Germans referred to them, a meal. The ships departed after curfew. A third batch of 560 left Jersey on 29 September 1942. The Jersey sailing resulted in more crowds, singing and yet more violence and arrests.

Rather than put the deportees in the ubiquitous "40 hommes et 8 chevaux" French boxcars, the Germans gave them second class train carriages to travel in. It took three days to reach the destination.

On 21 January 1943 a question was asked of the Home Secretary in the House of Commons about deportations from Guernsey. No information was made public.

=== February 1943 ===
A British commando raid on Sark in October 1942, Operation Basalt, motivated another batch of deportations in February 1943, with people taken from all three Islands. Of the 1,000 who were eligible under the criteria set out in orders, 201 were deported.

Included in this group were three Jews from Guernsey and five from Jersey. Despite being sent to internment camps in Biberach and Laufen, and Buchenwald concentration camp, they all survived the war.

=== Returns ===
A few weeks after the beginning of deportations, a few of those who were considered really sick were secretly returned to their island.

== Camps ==
=== Dorsten ===
Stalag VI-J is a POW camp located in Dorsten in the industrial Ruhr area. The barrage balloons around the camp gave clear indication it was in a bombing target area. The camp commandant became known as 'Rosy Joe' after using his own money to buy milk for the children. The Guernsey internees, and some from Jersey, spent six weeks in this transit camp until overcrowding in Biberach was solved. Single men were sent to Laufen, and Biberach and Wurzach received the families. Dorsten ceased to be used after 12 November 1942.

=== Biberach ===
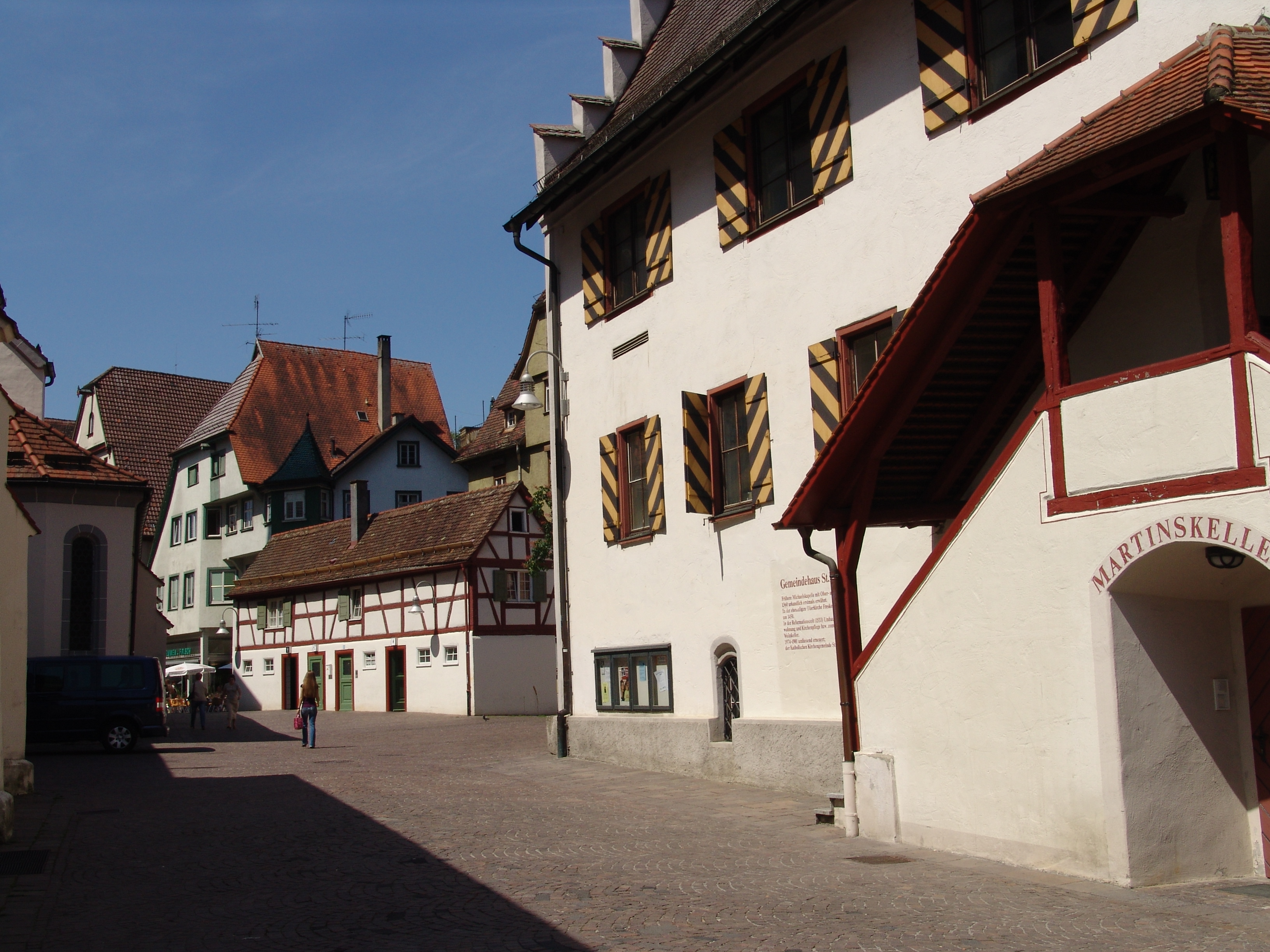
Biberach town

Oflag V-B was located at Biberach an der Riß in countryside in southern Germany with a view of the Bavarian Alps. It was renamed "Ilag V-B" when it changed use to a civilian internment camp. The camp was also known by the name Lager Lindele.

The first two batches of people from Jersey arrived in what was formerly a Hitler Youth summer camp, but now consisted of 23 barrack huts surrounded by barbed wire and watchtowers. Each hut contained 84 people in rooms intended for 18. The men were kept separated from the women and children. There were two hospital huts, storerooms, canteen, cookhouse, washing facilities and shower block, police and prison camp. A school was set up in the hut that contained German officers. Sanitary conditions were improved in late 1942 after complaints were made. The camp was crowded, though not as much as in the Bergen-Belsen concentration camp, where similar huts held 500 each.

In October/November 1942, single men were sent to Laufen, and a number of families were shipped to Wurzach, releasing space for families from Dorsten. 1,011 internees remained; 429 men, 437 women and 145 children, all but 20 Channel Islanders. The number of internees would rise with the February deportation intake, then later some Jews, and finally a group of 200 Arabs. A number of these late arrivals died as a consequence of being poorly treated previously.

Guernsey nurse Gladys Skillett, who was five months pregnant at the time of her deportation to Biberach, became the first Channel Islander to give birth while in captivity in Germany. Mothers were not amused to have birth certificates stamped with a swastika.

=== Wurzach-Allgau ===
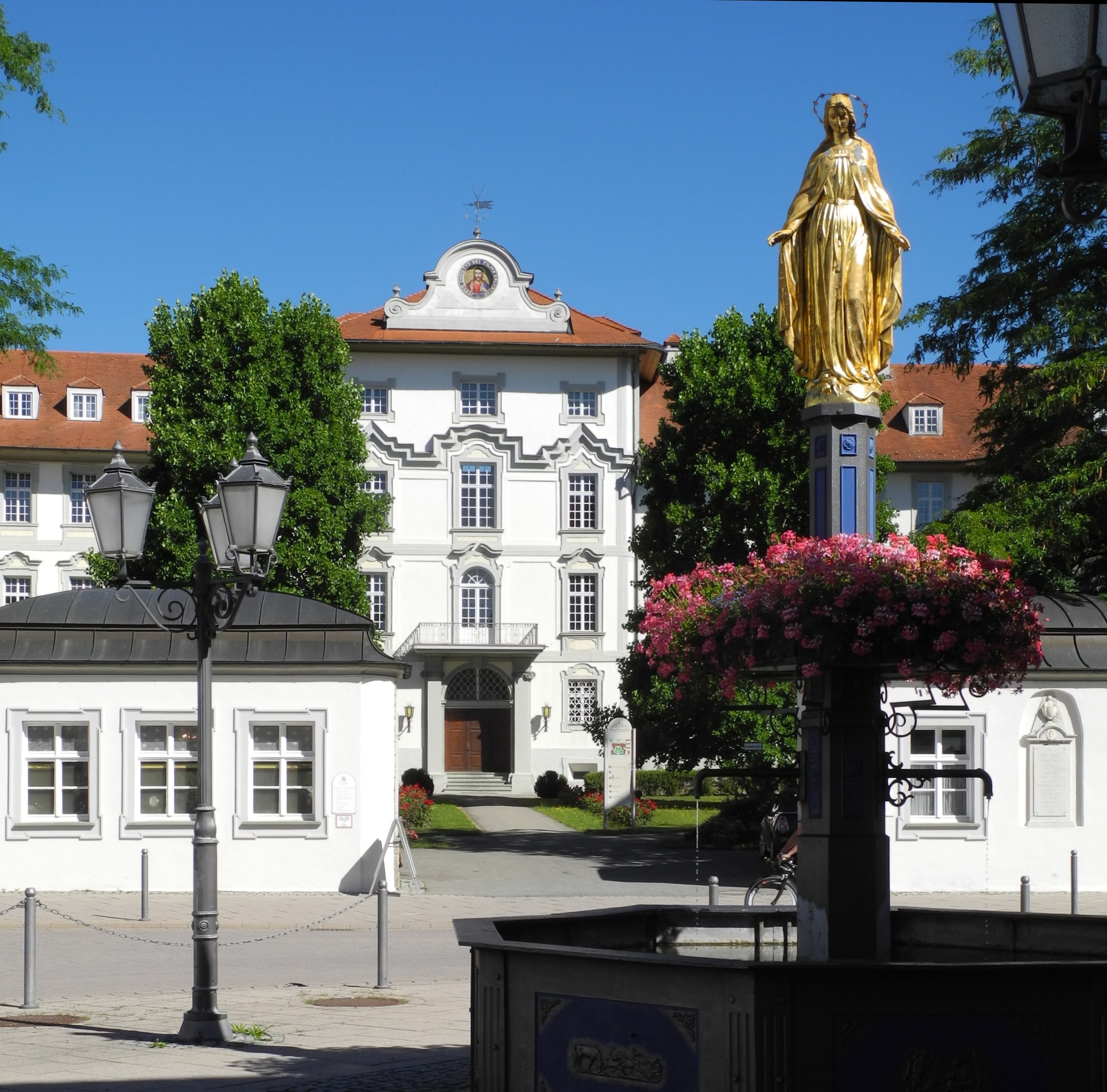
Bad Wurzach - Schloss

Now called Bad Wurzach, ‘Ilag V-C’ was a branch camp of Ilag V-B. It was about 30 miles south of Biberach and had also previously been an Officers camp. In October 1942, 618 Channel Islanders were transferred there from Biberach. More arrived in November from Dorsten. They were accommodated in the Schloss, a 17th-century mansion that had been a Catholic training college. They were made to scrub the filthy buildings clean within a week. It contained a hospital, theatre, storerooms, cellars and accommodation for men and women in different communal rooms housing up to 30 with bunk beds. Some families with very small children had a private room. A school for the 130 children was set up but they had no qualified teacher.

The Red Cross representatives who visited the camp from time to time were not happy with the accommodation, even though the Germans provided coal for fires when a visit was due. There was overcrowding, damp, rats, mice and fleas, but apart from an improvement in sanitation, few changes were made.

In late 1944, 72 Dutch Jews arrived from Bergen-Belsen, most appeared to have English grandparents. The deportees now learned first hand about conditions elsewhere.

=== Laufen ===
Ilag VII in Laufen is located in Bavaria with views of the Alps on the border with Austria and was designated a camp for single men. Previously used as an officers' POW camp, its name changed from Oflag to Ilag (Internierungslager) when the civilians arrived. It was a Schloss with multiple floors and staircases. Receiving single men aged over 16 from Dorsten and Biberach, the camp senior was initially Frank Stroobant, who in April 1943 was taken by the Germans as a witness to the site of the Katyn massacre where the bodies of 22,000 Polish officers had been discovered, murdered by the Russians. Ambrose Sherwill took over as camp senior in June 1943. A few American civilians were already in the camp. It was easier for men to adapt to camp life, however there was more trouble in this camp caused by hunger and boredom.

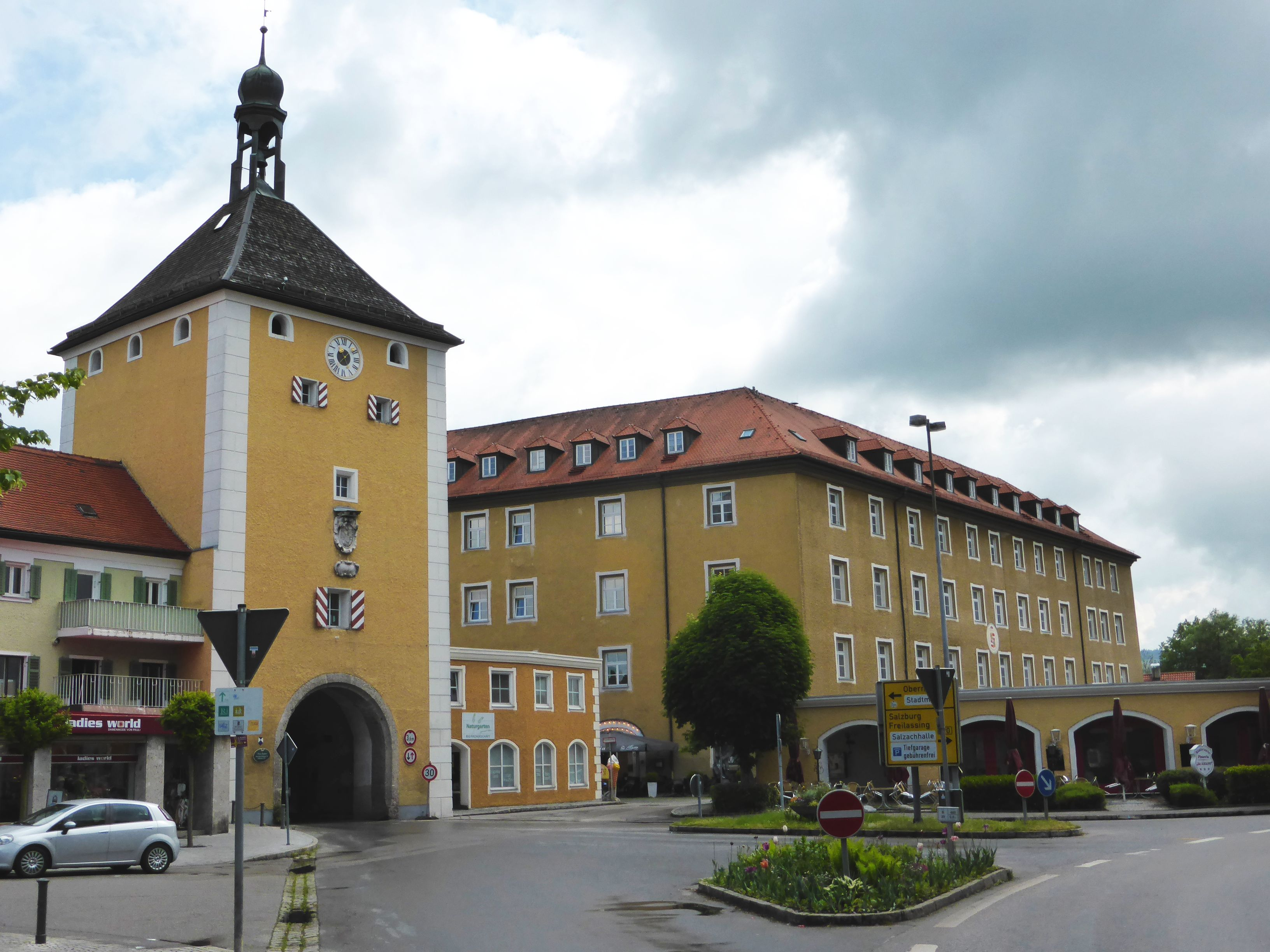
Laufen Schloss

Not receiving any Red Cross parcels before Christmas 1942, they were surprised when a nearby POW camp donated every person in Laufen with a tin of condensed milk and a packet of biscuits. Letters home mention how cold the weather and castle are.

As with the other camps, a fire brigade, canteen, tailors and shoemakers were set up. The YMCA supplied 1,500 books for a library and having 27 teachers, classes were set up in five languages and 33 subjects. Sports and amusements had to be created. On one occasion an individual, using makeup and suitable clothing pretended to be Adolf Hitler, inspecting various camp facilities and awarding the camp doctor with an Iron Cross. It resulted in the discovery that there was a camp “stooge” when a letter addressed to the camp commandant was found informing him of the antics.

John Lingshaw from Jersey decided to collaborate with the Germans and volunteered in August 1943 to go to Berlin and teach English to women working in the propaganda service. After the war, he was prosecuted and sentenced to 5 years in prison.

A 93-page memorial book, titled The bird-cage: Ilag vii Laufen, Oberbayern - Germany was written in 1944 and published in 1945.

Boredom was a major problem. Some internees were permitted to undertake paid work outside camp. The moral view of whether work should be done was strongly debated in the camp.

=== Other camps ===
A small number of Islanders spent time in other camps such as Liebenau on the Swiss border, Front Stalag 122 near Paris, Ilag XVIII Spittal. Ilag Westertimke and Stalag VIII-B at Teschen.

== Camp conditions ==
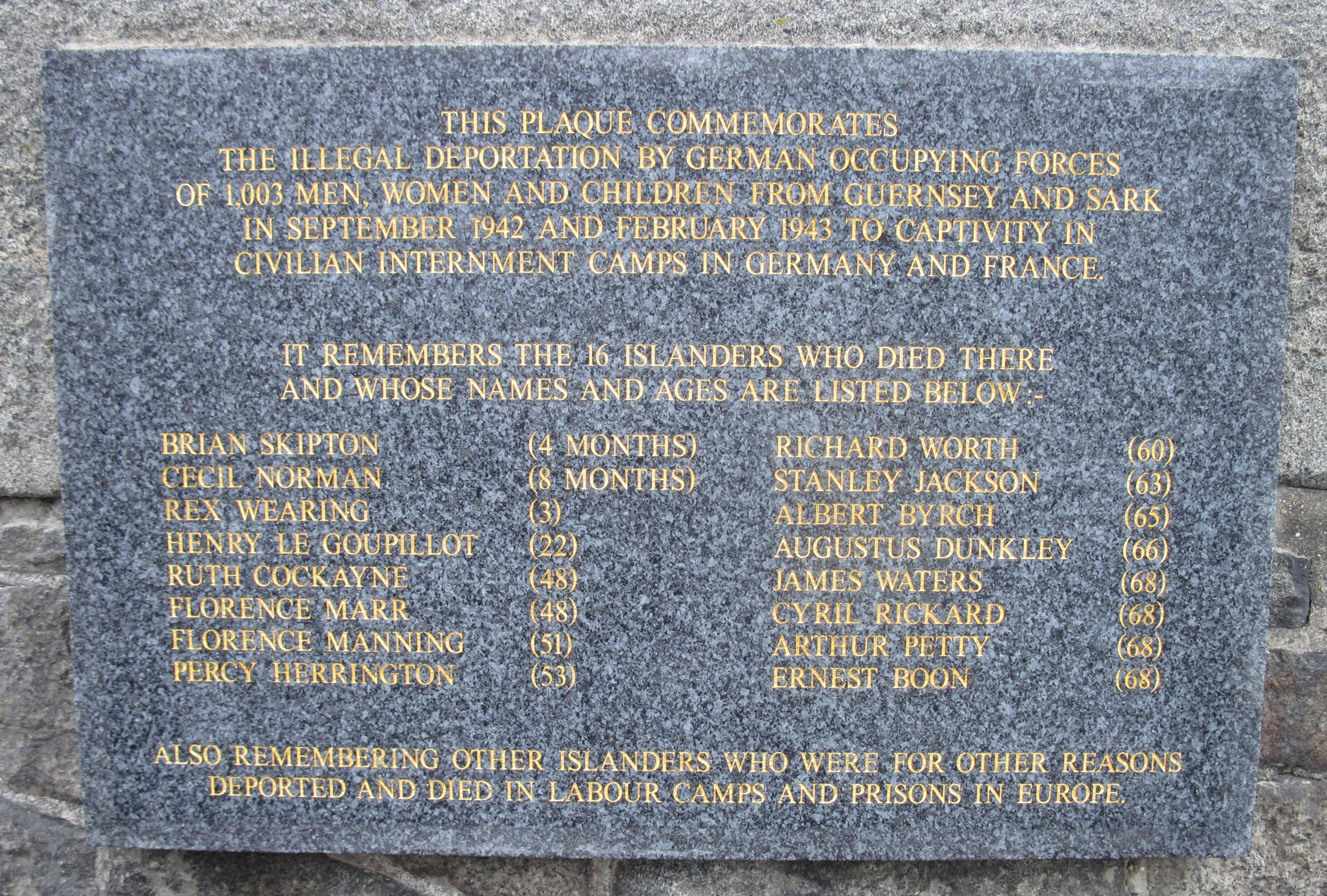
Guernsey plaque commemorating 1,003 Guernsey and Sark deportees

All camps were run by the military; there were daily inspections and three roll calls daily. Biberach and Wurzach were taken over by the police in December 1942, who understood nursing mothers and children better than the soldiers.

Each camp appointed a camp senior, a “Lagerführer”. Each hut had an elected leader. Everyone else in camp had daily duties, from cleaning to working in the hospital, camp barber, electrician etc. Biberach set up a camp police force to maintain discipline and help during air raids.

They slept mainly in wooden bunk beds with straw palliasses, a pillow and army blankets. There were lockers and communal showers. The internees were locked into huts overnight. In Biberach and Wurzach, men, women and children could socialize throughout the day, returning to their own accommodation before lights out.

Food was barely adequate; watery soup twice a day and a 1 kg loaf between 5 people each day. Red Cross parcels arriving in mid-October 1942 allowed an improvement in nutrition, with one parcel per person, per week until December 1944, when German transport systems started to collapse. Some cases of food, including, milk, fruit, jam, fish and soap, were received from the Red Cross in addition to individual parcels. December parcels included a Christmas pudding and marzipan sweets. Books and games began to arrive. A few parcels from the UK and the Islands were received.

Entertainment was provided with camp shows, musical events using instruments, sheet music and artists' materials provided by the regular visitors of the YMCA and YWCA. Sports days were regularly held, consisting of P.E., football, hockey and cricket matches. Church services on Sundays and schools for the children were also set up. Camp tokens in place of money and new ID cards were issued. “Camp art,” such as engraving tin mugs, sewing, creating Christmas toys and making sandals out of platted string, were popular hobbies. Seeds to plant in gardens were supplied by the Red Cross.

Long (up to 10 miles) and short walks outside of the Wurzach camp took place, with up to 150 people, under guard, including the odd visit to a hostelry. At Biberach, people allowed outside on walks would trade Red Cross goods for rabbits, chickens, eggs, cigars and schnapps, as well as collecting free food from hedgerows. Laufen walks were more limited.

A postcard system of communication to the UK (via the Red Cross) and the Channel Islands (via German “Feldpost” addressed to the “Kanal Inseln”) started in October 1942. Internees were allowed three lettersheets and four postcards a month. Lettersheets could contain as many words as could be fit on the page, very different to ordinary POWs. Each main camp had its censors, with Wurzach using Biberach censors. Laufen produced printed Christmas postcards with a drawing of the exterior of the Schloss (1943) and the interior of the vaulted canteen (1944). Trunks of clothing and goods left on the Islands arrived in the camps fairly intact. Individual parcels up to 5 kg in weight could be sent to camps post free; however, tobacco in them tended to vanish. The Red Cross also supplied some clothing.

Internees were given 10 marks a month to enable them to buy comforts. Men were allowed out to cut trees for firewood. Cold and damp was a severe problem when temperatures fell to -20°C.

Sickness from the poor food, diphtheria, and scarlet fever caused deaths.

Concealed radios in all three camps amongst the internees allowed them to gather news from the BBC overseas service. Other indications included the regular flights of bombers overflying the camps and occasional new arrivals who had seen cities “rather flattened”. In Wurzach in August 1944, one man put up a map and indicated the progress of Allied armies with red wool, which was regularly inspected by the camp commander. In Laufen in 1945, the German commander asked to be given the secret camp radio as the camp was about to be searched. Sherwill handed it over, the camp was searched and the radio returned to him.

In September 1944, 125 elderly and infirm people were repatriated on the SS Drottningholm via Sweden to the UK. Following a three-day January trip by the Laufen senior Ambrose Sherwill to Berlin to meet the Swiss delegation, 24 from Laufen were included in a further 212 being repatriated in April 1945.

Boredom and the monotony of the camps were major problems for everyone; the few special events became memorable. Laufen men got to visit a travelling circus and acquired their own cinema projector to show borrowed films. In January 1945, a travelling cinema arrived at Wurzach, many children seeing a moving picture for the first time. Occasional Red Cross letters were received from the Islands, despite their being cut off since August 1944.

Once the Red Cross parcels began to arrive in bulk, 2,000-6,000 at Wurzach at a time, those in camps were probably better fed than most people left in the occupied Islands. Some in camps were sending Red Cross parcels onto the Channel Islands. 300 bars of soap and 500 tins of cocoa were sent from Biberach to the island children in March 1944. From August 1944 onwards, the invasion of southern France cut the Red Cross parcel supply route which, combined with the damage to the railway system, reduced the parcel delivery to low numbers. By December 1944, food was in short supply, resulting in internees breaking out to look for food at nearby farms.

== Liberation ==
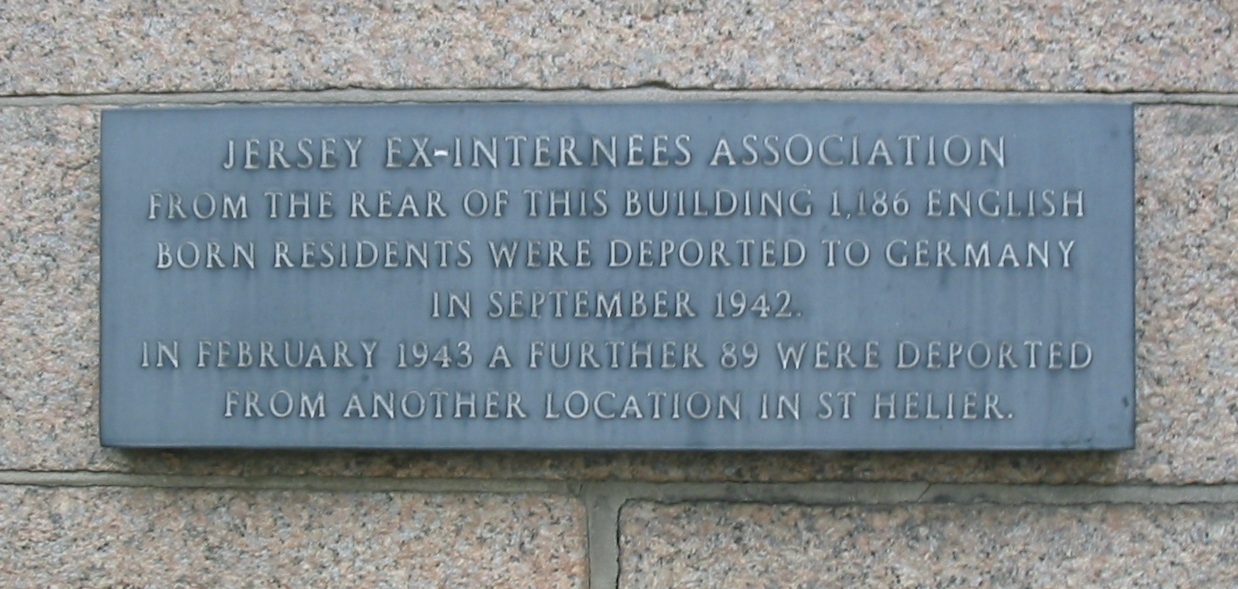
Jersey plaque: From the rear of this building 1,186 English born residents were deported to Germany in September 1942. In February 1943 a further 89 were deported from another location in St. Helier.

Biberach town was bombed on 12 April, killing German civilians, then on 22 April, French tanks following up the German retreat passed by without stopping. The next day, with German permission, a detainee was permitted to cycle to the French units commanded by General Leclerc and tell them the town was “open”. However, when the French arrived, they were fired on and there was a rush to hang out white flags on the barbed wire. The Germans retreated, and the camp was liberated on St George's Day. Officers arrived to interview everyone and issue temporary ID cards. On 29 May 1945, 1,822 were flown to England, including 160 children under 14.

Wurzach was liberated on 28 April 1945 by a French Moroccan armoured unit who were unaware of the internees. Believing the Schloss was an HQ, bloodshed was avoided by the swift surrender of the local Volkssturm. The internees eventually left the camp in early June and were flown to the UK on 7 June.

Laufen was the last to be liberated, on 4 May 1945, by Americans of the U.S. 3rd Army. Unaware of the camp, they spotted a Union Flag painted on a sheet and came to investigate. Many men spent the next month helping local hospitals look after concentration camp victims. The town of Laufen turned out to wave them goodbye when they drove off to the airfield to fly to England in June.

Some children had been born in the camps and walked out on liberation.

It was several months before the authorities in England had issued everyone ration cards, ID cards and travel warrants, with some returning to Guernsey in August.

== Deaths ==
Three had died in Dorsten, twelve in Wurzach. Twenty in Biberach, excluding Jews and others whose deaths were not recorded and ten in Laufen. Ten of the deaths were females and five were children. Up to 20 internees had been allowed to attend each of the funerals in the local churchyards.

== See also ==
- Channel Islands Occupation Society
- German occupation of the Channel Islands
- History of the Jews in Guernsey
- History of the Jews in Jersey
