= D7 =

D7, D07, D.VII, D VII, D.7 or D-7 may refer to:

== Arts and entertainment ==
- D^{7}, a chord (music)
- D7, a note in the whistle register
- D-7, a song by the Wipers from the 1980 album Is This Real?
  - Covered by Nirvana on the 1992 EP Hormoaning
- D-7, a fictional Star Trek Klingon starship class

== Businesses and organisations ==
- Dinar Líneas Aéreas (1992–2002), IATA airline designator D7
- AirAsia X, IATA airline designator D7
- Digital 7, a group of national governments seeking to strengthen the digital economy

== Places ==
- D7 road (Croatia), a state road
- D7 motorway (Czech Republic)
- A Dublin postal district

== Science, technology and mathematics ==
=== Military ===
- D.VII aircraft (disambiguation), a number of aircraft
  - Fokker D.VII, a German World War I fighter aircraft
- HMS Patroller (D07), a 1943 British Royal Navy escort aircraft carrier
- HMS D7, a Royal Navy submarine launched in 1911

=== Transportation and vehicles ===
- Bavarian D VII, an 1880 German steam locomotive model
- Caterpillar D7, a 1938 medium bulldozer
- Dewoitine D.7, a 1920s French sport plane
- Pennsylvania Railroad class D7, a steam locomotive
- LNER Class D7, a class of British steam locomotives
- ATS D7, a Formula One racing car
- D7 Super, a BSA Bantam motorcycle

=== Other ===
- ATC code D07, Corticosteroids, dermatological preparations, a subgroup of the Anatomical Therapeutic Chemical Classification System
- D7 polytope, in 7-dimensional geometry
- d^{7}, a d electron count
- DVCPRO (D-7), a professional digital video format

== See also ==
- 7D (disambiguation)
