= 7D =

7D or 7-D may refer to:

- 7D (Argentina), a political scandal in Argentina
- 7D (Long Island bus)
- The 7D, an animated series for Disney XD
- 7D, the production code for the 1987 Doctor Who serial Time and the Rani
- Canon EOS 7D, a 2009 18-megapixel digital single-lens reflex camera
- Canon EOS 7D Mark II, a 2014 20-megapixel digital single-lens reflex camera
- Donbassaero IATA airline designator
- Konica Minolta Maxxum 7D, a 2004 6.1-megapixel digital single-lens reflex camera
- Oflag VII-D, a World War II German prisoner-of-war camp for officers
- Seven-dimensional space
- Sevendust, an alternative metal band based in Atlanta, Georgia, United States

== See also ==
- D7 (disambiguation)
