= Nassy =

Nassy may refer to:

- David Cohen Nassy, a colonizer who started Jewish colonies in the Caribbean
- Josef Nassy, an artist of Jewish descent
- a Pokémon character, see List of Pokémon (102–151)#Exeggutor
