= D.VII aircraft =

D.VII aircraft may refer to:

== World War I German fighters ==
- Fokker D.VII
- LFG Roland D.VII
- Albatros D.VII
- Pfalz D.VII
- Aviatik D.VII
- Schütte-Lanz D.VII
- Kondor D.VII

== Modern replicas ==
- Airdrome Fokker D-VII
- Loehle Fokker D-VII
- World War I Aeroplanes Fokker D.VII

== See also ==
- List of surviving Fokker D.VIIs
