= Oflag VII-D =

Oflag VII-D / Oflag VII-C/Z / Ilag VII/Z
- Tittmoning, Bavaria
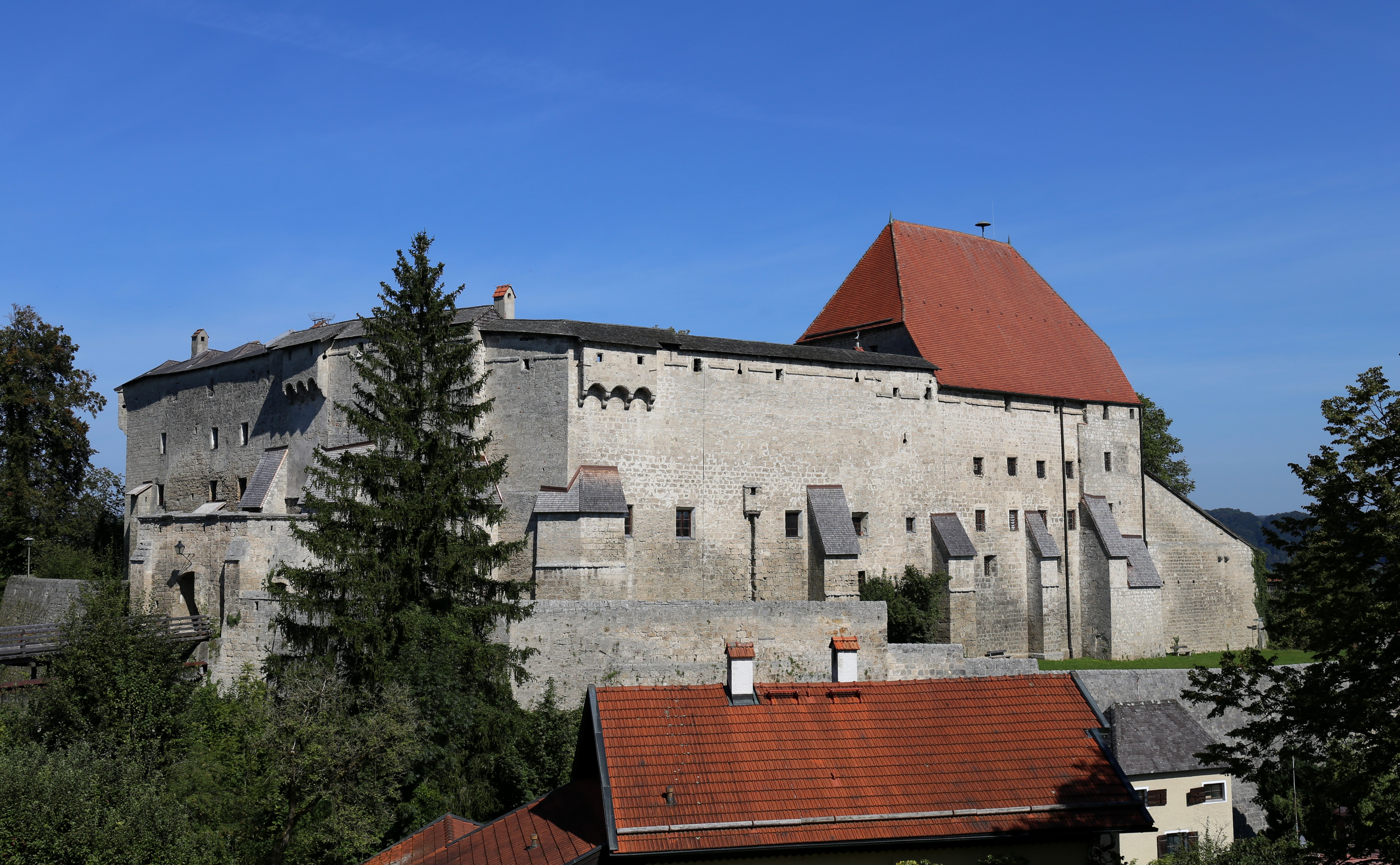
- Tittmoning Castle, which housed the camp

Site information
- Type: Prisoner-of-war camp / internment camp
- Controlled by: Nazi Germany

Location
- Tittmoning, Germany (pre-war borders, 1937)
- Coordinates: 48.06063°N 12.76328°E

Site history
- In use: 1941–1945
- Battles/wars: World War II

Garrison information
- Occupants: Allied POWs; Channel Island internees

Oflag VII-D was a World War II German prisoner-of-war camp for officers (Offizierlager) located in Tittmoning Castle in south-eastern Bavaria.

== Camp history ==
The camp was opened as Oflag VII-D in February 1941, but in November 1941 became a sub-camp of Oflag VII-C, and was redesignated Oflag VII-C/Z. During their internment the activities of the prisoners included putting on performances of plays and sketches, including a performance of Shakespeare's Hamlet. In February 1942 the prisoners were transferred to Oflag VII-B in Eichstätt, and the castle then became an internment camp (Internierungslager) for men from the British Channel Islands of Jersey and Guernsey. As a sub-camp of Ilag VII, it was designated Ilag VII/Z. The camp was liberated in May 1945.

== See also ==
- List of prisoner-of-war camps in Germany
- Oflag VII-C in Laufen
- Oflag
- Ilag
