= Josef Nassy =

Surinamese American visual artist (1904–1976)

Josef Nassy (born January 19, 1904 –1976) was a Surinamese American expatriate artist of Jewish descent. Nassy was living in Belgium when World War II began, and was one of about 2,000 civilians holding American passports who were confined in German internment camps during the war.

== Biography ==
=== Early life ===
Born Joseph Johan Cosmo Nassy in Paramaribo, Suriname, Nassy was the son of a well-to-do businessman. He descended on his father's side from Jews who had fled Spain during the Inquisition, although by his grandparents' generation the family no longer practised Judaism. In 1919, Nassy began to live with his father, who had moved to New York. He graduated from high school and, in 1926, earned a certificate in electrical engineering. In 1929, Nassy went to England, where he was employed in the installation of sound systems for a film company. The following year he was sent to Paris and then to Belgium for the same purpose. Before leaving for Europe, Nassy had obtained an American passport under the name Josef Nassy. He apparently claimed that he was born in San Francisco in 1899. Since San Francisco's public records had been destroyed in the earthquake of 1906, authorities issued the passport without further investigation. Nassy continued to work for the same firm until 1934, when he decided to study painting. He was admitted to an academy of fine arts in Brussels, Belgium.

=== German occupation ===
In 1939, he married a Belgian and began earning a living as a portrait artist. The Germans occupied Belgium in May 1940, but Nassy and his wife did not leave. Following the Japanese attack on Pearl Harbor in December 1941, the United States entered World War II. On April 14, 1942, four months after the United States entered the war, Nassy was arrested as an enemy national in German-occupied Belgium. For seven months, he was held in the Beverloo transit camp in Leopoldsburg, Belgium; he was then transferred to Germany and spent the rest of the war (1942-1945) at the Laufen internment camp and its subcamp, Tittmoning, both in Upper Bavaria.

Throughout his three-year imprisonment, Nassy created a unique visual diary of more than 200 paintings and drawings. Many of these works depict daily life in the internment camps. Rules of the Geneva Conventions governed conditions in civilian internment camps, including Laufen and Tittmoning in Nazi Germany. In contrast, such rules did not apply at the nearby Dachau concentration camp and other camps across Nazi-occupied Europe, where prisoners were brutally exploited for forced labor, and many died from exhaustion, starvation, and other harsh conditions.

Nassy and other internees in Laufen and Tittmoning were not detailed for forced labor. They usually had enough food, thanks to Red Cross packages that supplemented German rations of bread and soup. The International YMCA supplied Nassy with sketch pads, pencils, crayons, oil paints, and painting boards—materials that were not available in concentration camps, where imprisoned artists who sketched clandestinely were forced to improvise using scraps of paper or supplies stolen from the Germans. The camp commandant actually encouraged Nassy to paint and give art lessons to other internees; however the life that Nassy depicted was obviously restricted. His works stressed features such as barbed wire, watchtowers, walls, gates, and prison bars.

By early 1945, 850 men holding American and British passports were interned at Laufen and Tittmoning. Many of the Americans were expatriates whose immigrant parents had returned to Europe for various reasons in the 1920s and 1930s. A dozen blacks and about 50 Jews were also interned at these camps. Many of the Jews had obtained false papers showing British, South American, or U.S. citizenship.

=== Postwar life ===
The U.S. Third Army liberated Laufen on May 5, 1945. Nassy and nearly all the internees at Laufen and Tittmoning survived the war. A year after liberation, Nassy was repatriated to Belgium. He succeeded in getting all his works out of Germany and in the following years participated in a number of expositions of Holocaust art; he often expressed the hope that his works be kept together. Severin Wunderman, a California businessman and art collector, purchased much of Nassy collection in 1984. In 1992, he donated that collection to the United States Holocaust Memorial Museum. At least 19 paintings from Nassy's internment at Laufen-Tittmoning and recovery in Belgium upon release exist in private hands.

== Notes ==
This article incorporates text from the United States Holocaust Memorial Museum and has been released under the GFDL.
