= Oflag V-B =

World War II German prisoner-of-war camp

- Biberach an der Riss, Baden-Württemberg

Site information
- Type: Prisoner-of-war camp
- Controlled by: Nazi Germany

Location
- Biberach, Germany (pre-war borders, 1937)
- Coordinates: 48.10805°N 9.77694°E

Site history
- In use: 1940-1942

Oflag V-B was a World War II German prisoner-of-war camp for officers (Offizierlager), in operation from 1940 until 1942. It was located in Biberach in south-eastern Baden-Württemberg.

== Camp history ==
The camp was originally built as barracks for German Army infantry early in 1939 and consisted of concrete single storey buildings on a plateau north-west of the town. It was named "Lindele". In good weather there was a fine view of the Alps to the south.

In May 1940 the first British and Commonwealth officers captured in the battle of France arrived. The Senior British Officer was Major-General V. M. Fortune. The camp was clean and living conditions were satisfactory. The first officers from the battle of Greece arrived on 16 June 1941. They were surprised at the good conditions after several weeks of travel and grim conditions in transit camps.

In October 1941 the British officers were transferred to Oflag VI-B in Warburg. For three months after their removal the camp was used as a transit camp for Soviet prisoners. It was then used as a temporary camp for French and Serbian officers.

In September 1942 the camp became Lager Lindele ("Lindele Camp"), and was used as an Ilag ("Internment Camp") adopting the code Ilag V-B for about 1,200 family civilian internees deported from the Channel Islands. The camp containing men, women and children. Around 2,000 civilian Channel Islanders were interned in different camps in Germany as a reprisal for the deportation of German nationals from the Kingdom of Iran to Camp 10 in Loveday, South Australia.

== Escapes ==
There were several escape attempts during the summer of 1941. The largest such attempt was on 13 September, when 26 prisoners got out through a tunnel. Four managed to reach Switzerland, the rest were recaptured. It is possible that the large number or escape attempts and the close proximity to the Swiss border (only 110 km (68 mi) away) prompted the authorities to move the prisoners.

The successful escapes by Lt. Duncan and Cpt O'Sullivan were documented extensively at the time by British Intelligence. Lt. Duncan's report is in the file M.I.9/S/P.G.(G) 639 (subsequently released by the British National Archives under WO/208/3307/26) with a more extensive autobiographical account written up and published in the 1950s under the title of "Underground from Posen". Cpt O'Sullivan's report is in the file M.I.9/S/P.G.(G) 637 (subsequently released by the British National Archives under WO/208/3307/28).

Australian Army Private Francis McGregor Brown successfully escaped Oflag V- A on 3 November 1941 then after recapture escaped V-B on 24 March 1943 and remained at Liberty until being recaptured on 9 November 1943 and interned at Oflag IVC until liberation.

== See also ==
- List of prisoner-of-war camps in Germany
- Oflag
- Ilag
- John Lingshaw
