= Gladys Skillett =

Guernsey nurse (1918–2010)

Gladys Skillett (2 May 1918 – 11 February 2010), born Gladys Eileen Dillingham, was a British Guernsey nurse. In September 1942, during World War II and the German occupation of the Channel Islands, Skillett was one of 834 people from the Bailiwick of Guernsey to be deported to Germany. Nearly 2,000 Channel Islanders were to be deported during World War II.

Skillett was five months pregnant when she, and her London-born husband, Sydney Skillett, were sent to the Lindele internment camp near the town of Biberach an der Riß, Germany. Skillett gave birth to a son, David Skillett, in a small hospital in Biberach, becoming the first Channel Islander, as well as the first woman from Guernsey, to give birth in German wartime captivity. While in the hospital's maternity ward, Skillett befriended a German woman named Maria Koch, who had also just given birth to a son, Heiner. Koch's husband, Julius Koch, was in the Wehrmacht. The two women continued their unlikely friendship through the fences surrounding Skillett's camp during the war.

Skillett's Lindele internment camp was liberated on 23 April 1945 by General Philippe Leclerc de Hauteclocque. Skillett delivered supplies to Maria Koch and her family before being repatriated to Guernsey. However, their friendship has endured in series of exchanges between the people of Guernsey and the people of Biberach, which continue up until her death. In 2005, 60-year-old David Skillett and Heiner Koch marched together in Biberach's Schützenfest, along with another of Gladys's daughters, Gloria, who was also born during the German internment.

Skillett died on 11 February 2010 aged 91.
