= World War I Aeroplanes Fokker D.VII =

American homebuilt aircraft

Fokker D.VII

General information
- Type: Homebuilt aircraft
- National origin: United States
- Manufacturer: World War I Aeroplanes Inc
- Designer: Herbert Kelley
- Status: Plans no longer available

History
- Developed from: Fokker D.VII

The World War I Aeroplanes Fokker D.VII is an American homebuilt aircraft that was designed by Herbert Kelley and produced by World War I Aeroplanes Inc of Poughkeepsie, New York. When it was available the aircraft was supplied in the form of plans for amateur construction. The aircraft is a replica of the First World War Fokker D.VII fighter aircraft.

== Design and development ==
The Fokker D.VII features a cantilever strut-braced biplane, a single-seat open cockpit, fixed conventional landing gear with a tailskid and a single engine in tractor configuration.

The aircraft fuselage is made from welded steel tubing with the wings constructed from wood, all covered in doped aircraft fabric. Its biplane wing configuration has a span of 29.30 ft (8.9 m). The acceptable power range is 160 to 185 hp (119 to 138 kW) and the standard engine used is a 185 hp (138 kW) Mercedes-Benz powerplant.

The aircraft has a typical empty weight of 1,540 lb (700 kg) and a gross weight of 1,870 lb (850 kg), giving a useful load of 330 lb (150 kg).

== Specifications (Fokker D.VII) ==
Data from AeroCrafter

General characteristics

- Crew: one
- Length: 29.90 ft (9.11 m)
- Wingspan: 29 ft 4 in (8.94 m)
- Empty weight: 1,540 lb (699 kg)
- Gross weight: 1,870 lb (848 kg)
- Powerplant: 1 × Mercedes-Benz four cylinder, air-cooled, four stroke automotive engine, 185 hp (138 kW)
- Propellers: 2-bladed wooden fixed pitch

Performance

- Cruise speed: 116 mph (187 km/h, 101 kn)
- Rate of climb: 865 ft/min (4.39 m/s)
