= Schütte-Lanz D.VII =

D.VII
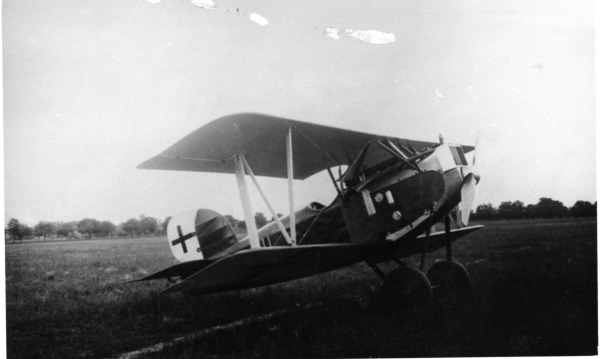

General information
- Type: Biplane fighter aircraft
- National origin: Germany
- Manufacturer: Luftschiffbau Schütte-Lanz
- Number built: 3

The Schütte-Lanz D.VII was a single engine, biplane fighter aircraft designed and built in Germany towards the end of World War I.

== Design and development ==
The wood and fabric D.VII was a development of the Schütte-Lanz D.III fighter which had participated without distinction in the first D type (single seat biplane fighter) competition held in late January 1918. Changes included longer span wings, more effective ailerons and a more powerful version of the Mercedes D.III engine, the 119 kW (160 hp) Mercedes D.IIIavü. It first flew in May 1918 and was ready for the second D type competition, held from late May through June.

The wings of the two fighters had much in common: both were single bay biplanes with N-form interplane struts, dihedral only on the upper plane and slight stagger. Though the span of the D.VII was 1.00 m (39.4 in) greater, both fighters had upper and lower wings of equal span but narrower lower chords. Over most of the span the wings were straight and parallel edged but the ailerons increased in chord outwards, widening the outer wing. The D.VII differed in having ailerons on both upper and lower planes.

In contrast to the D.III's airfoil section upper wing radiator the D.VII had a car-type rectangular cross-section one mounted in the nose immediately in front of the Mercedes engine. The fuselage behind was flat sided and plywood covered, though with a rounded decking; the single open cockpit was at the wing trailing edges, both of which had cut-outs to aid the pilot's vision. In side view the fuselage of the 500 mm (19.7 in) shorter D.VII was less slender than its predecessor. Its tailplane, placed on top of the fuselage, had a higher aspect ratio and carried a single piece elevator; its vertical tail was taller and narrower, the balanced rudder ending above the elevator. The fixed conventional undercarriage had a single axle mounted on a pair of V-struts, aided by a tailskid mounted at the extreme tail.

Despite its disappointing competition performance, the three prototypes continued developmental testing up to the Armistice in November.

== Specifications ==
Data from The Complete Book of Fighters, p.521

General characteristics

- Crew: 1
- Length: 6.00 m (19 ft 8 in)
- Wingspan: 9.00 m (29 ft 6 in)
- Empty weight: 740 kg (1,631 lb)
- Gross weight: 920 kg (2,028 lb)
- Powerplant: 1 × Mercedes D.IIIavü 6-cylinder inline, 130 kW (180 hp)
- Propellers: 2-bladed

Performance

- Maximum speed: 180 km/h (110 mph, 97 kn)
- Endurance: 1.5 hr
- Time to altitude: 31.6 min to 5,000 m (16,405 ft)

Armament

- Guns: 2×7.9 mm (0.31 in) LMG 08/15 machine guns
