= Laufen, Germany =

Laufen
- Town
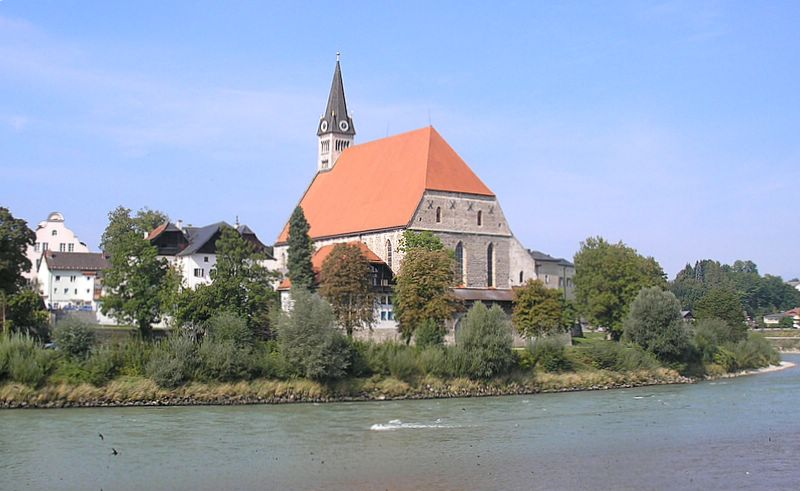
- Parish church in Laufen

- Coat of arms

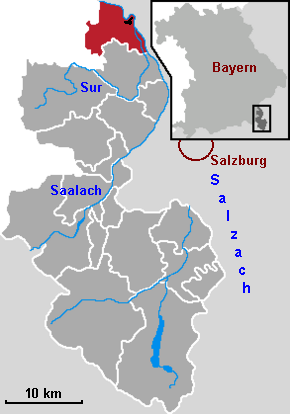
- Location of Laufen within Berchtesgadener Land district
- Interactive map of Laufen
- Location within Germany Location within Bavaria
- Coordinates: 47°56′N 12°56′E
- Country: Germany
- State: Bavaria
- Admin. region: Oberbayern
- District: Berchtesgadener Land
- Subdivisions: 74 Gemeindeteile

Government
  - Mayor (2020–26): Hans Feil (CSU)

Area
  - Total: 35.28 km^{2} (13.62 sq mi)
- Elevation: 394–412 m (1,293–1,352 ft)

Population (2025-12-31)
  - Total: 7,333
  - Density: 207.9/km^{2} (538.3/sq mi)
- Time zone: UTC+01:00 (CET)
  - Summer (DST): UTC+02:00 (CEST)
- Postal codes: 83410
- Dialling codes: 08682
- Vehicle registration: BGL (until 1972 LF)
- Website: stadtlaufen.de

Laufen (German pronunciation: [ˈlaʊfn̩]; Central Bavarian: Laffa an da Soizach) is a town in Berchtesgadener Land district in Bavaria at the Austria–Germany border.

== History ==
It was first mentioned in a deed of 748. The rapids that gave the town the name (Laufen = rapid running waters) were also responsible for the town's wealth from the salt trade. Small boats that transported the extremely valuable cargo from the rapids north of Salzburg were reloaded at Laufen to larger boats by privilege of the Prince-Archbishop of Salzburg. When the independent principality was finally divided in 1816 between the Bavarian kingdom and the Habsburg Empire in the wake of the Napoleonic Wars, the town was split into a Bavarian part carrying the name of Laufen and into an Austrian town (the former Laufen suburbs on the right hand side of the river) by the name of Oberndorf. With the building of railways by the middle of the 19th century, the transport of salt on the river Salzach came to an end, taking away the former source of wealth. Several floods devastated both towns by the end of the century. The flood of 1899 destroyed the old bridge. A new iron bridge was built in a safer place up the river and opened jointly by the King of Bavaria and the Austrian Emperor in 1903.

Laufen Castle is a square-shaped 15th-century castle that was built for the Archbishop of Salzburg. It overlooks the Salzach River. During World War II, the castle was used first as a prisoner-of-war camp for officers, Oflag VII-C. Then In May 1942 the officers were transferred to another camp, and the castle was used as an internment camp Ilag VII housing some hundreds of men deported from the Channel Islands of Jersey and Guernsey and some American civilians that had been caught in Europe by the declaration of war by Germany on the United States on 11 December 1941. (See Ilag#Ilag VII Laufen and Tittmoning.)

== International relations ==
Laufen, Germany is twinned with:

- Laufen, Switzerland

== Gallery ==
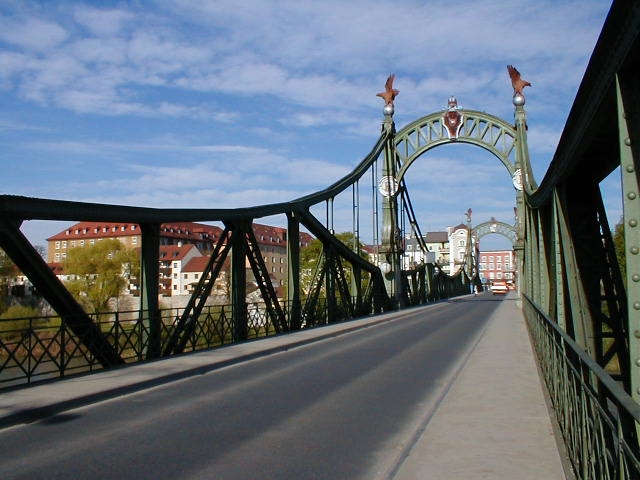
Bridge from Oberndorf to Laufen

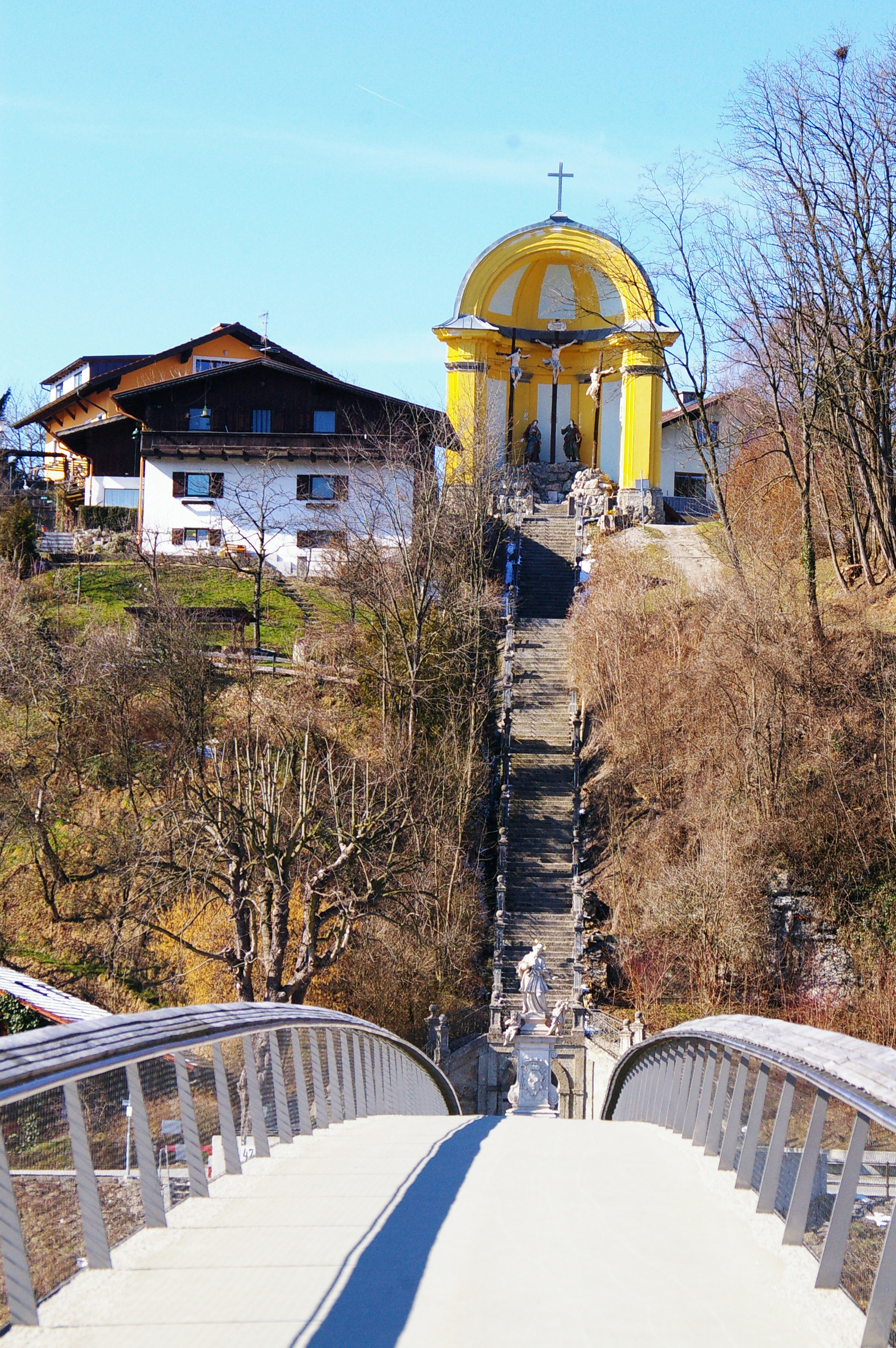
Pedestrian bridge connecting Laufen with its former suburb Altach (Oberndorf)

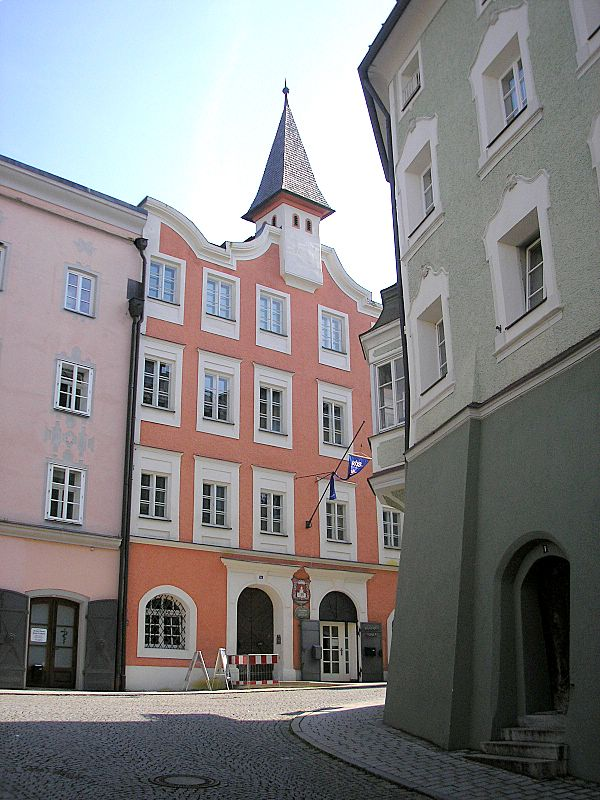
Laufen Salzach Old Town hall

== See also ==
- Oflag VII-C

=== Notable residents ===
- Hans Adam Weissenkircher (1646–1695), Austrian painter of the Baroque
- Johann Michael Rottmayr (1654–1730), Salzburg Baroque painter and imperial court painter
- Konrad Krafft von Dellmensingen (1862–1953), General, founding father of the German mountain group and first commander of the German Alpine Corps
