= Tittmoning =

- Town
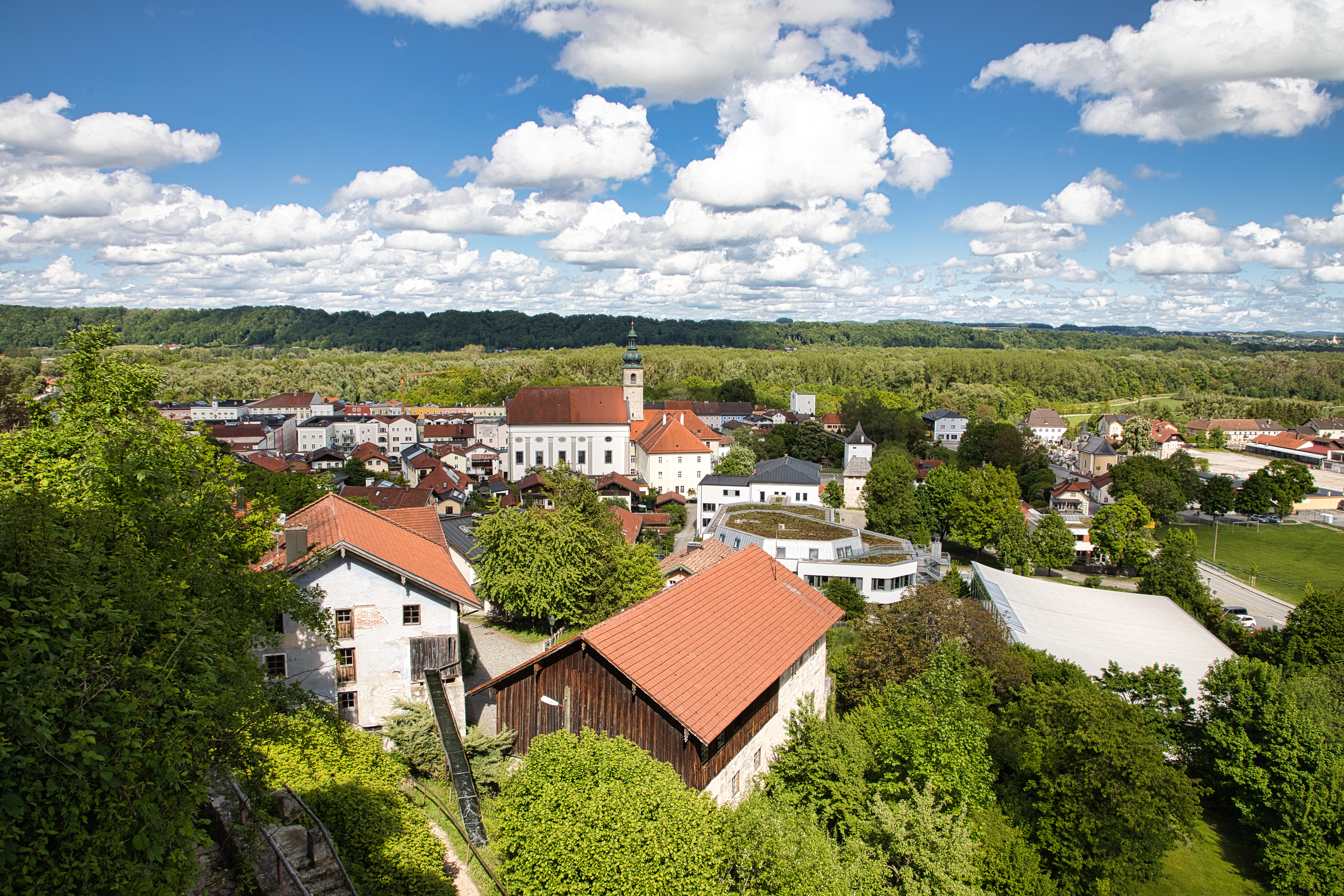
- Tittmoning in 2021

- Coat of arms

- Location of Tittmoning within Traunstein district
- Interactive map of Tittmoning
- Location within Germany Location within Bavaria
- Coordinates: 48°3′47″N 12°46′1″E
- Country: Germany
- State: Bavaria
- Admin. region: Oberbayern
- District: Traunstein

Government
  - Mayor (2020–26): Andreas Bratzdrum (CSU)

Area
  - Total: 72.04 km^{2} (27.81 sq mi)
- Elevation: 388 m (1,273 ft)

Population (2025-12-31)
  - Total: 5,744
  - Density: 79.73/km^{2} (206.5/sq mi)
- Time zone: UTC+01:00 (CET)
  - Summer (DST): UTC+02:00 (CEST)
- Postal codes: 84529
- Dialling codes: 08683
- Vehicle registration: TS
- Website: www.tittmoning.de

Tittmoning (German: [ˈtɪtmɔnɪŋ]) is a town in the district of Traunstein, in Bavaria, Germany.

== Geography ==
It is situated in the historic Rupertiwinkel region, on the left bank of the river Salzach, which forms the border with the municipality of Ostermiething in the Austrian state of Salzburg. The two communes are linked by a bridge. Tittmoning is located about 30 kilometres (19 mi) northwest of the Salzburg city centre.

== History ==
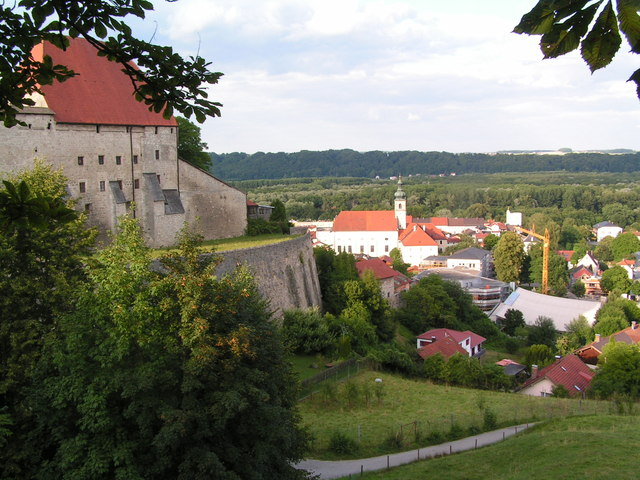
Castle and town

The settlement of Titamanninga was first mentioned about 790 AD, then a possession of St Peter's Abbey, Salzburg. After the Archbishops of Salzburg had achieved immediate status in the late 13th century, Tittmoning Castle was built as a border fortress against the incursions by the Dukes of Bavaria. The episcopal administrator of the castle and its environs was called burgrave (Burggraf), as was Ulrich von Wispeck in 1282. Tittmoning was occupied by the forces of the German king Louis the Bavarian during his conflict with the papacy in 1324; nevertheless, he restored it to the Salzburg archbishops three years later.

Temporarily given in pawn to Bavaria, the unlucky Prince-Archbishop Wolf Dietrich Raitenau had to cede the castle to the Bavarian duke Maximilian I in 1611; it was repurchased by his successor Archbishop Mark Sittich von Hohenems and rebuilt as a hunting lodge according to plans designed by Santino Solari. By the 17th century, the castle had finally lost its character of a fortress and became the summer residence of the Prince-Archbishops of Salzburg. Upon the Congress of Vienna, the Rupertiwinkel region finally fell to the Kingdom of Bavaria and Tittimoning Castle, damaged by French troops during the Napoleonic Wars, passed under state-ownership.

In the early years of World War II, the castle was used as a prisoner-of-war camp for officers, Oflag VII-D. British and American citizens were also interned there (see Ilag VII Laufen and Tittmoning). They put on plays and sketches, including a performance of Hamlet by Shakespeare. Photos of these productions and paintings of the castle may be found here.

Joseph Ratzinger lived here as a child between 11 July 1929 and 5 December 1932. Later, he became a cardinal and in 2005, was elected Pope Benedict XVI.

A festival takes place here every year at the end of May, with theatrical presentations, medieval tournaments and jousting.

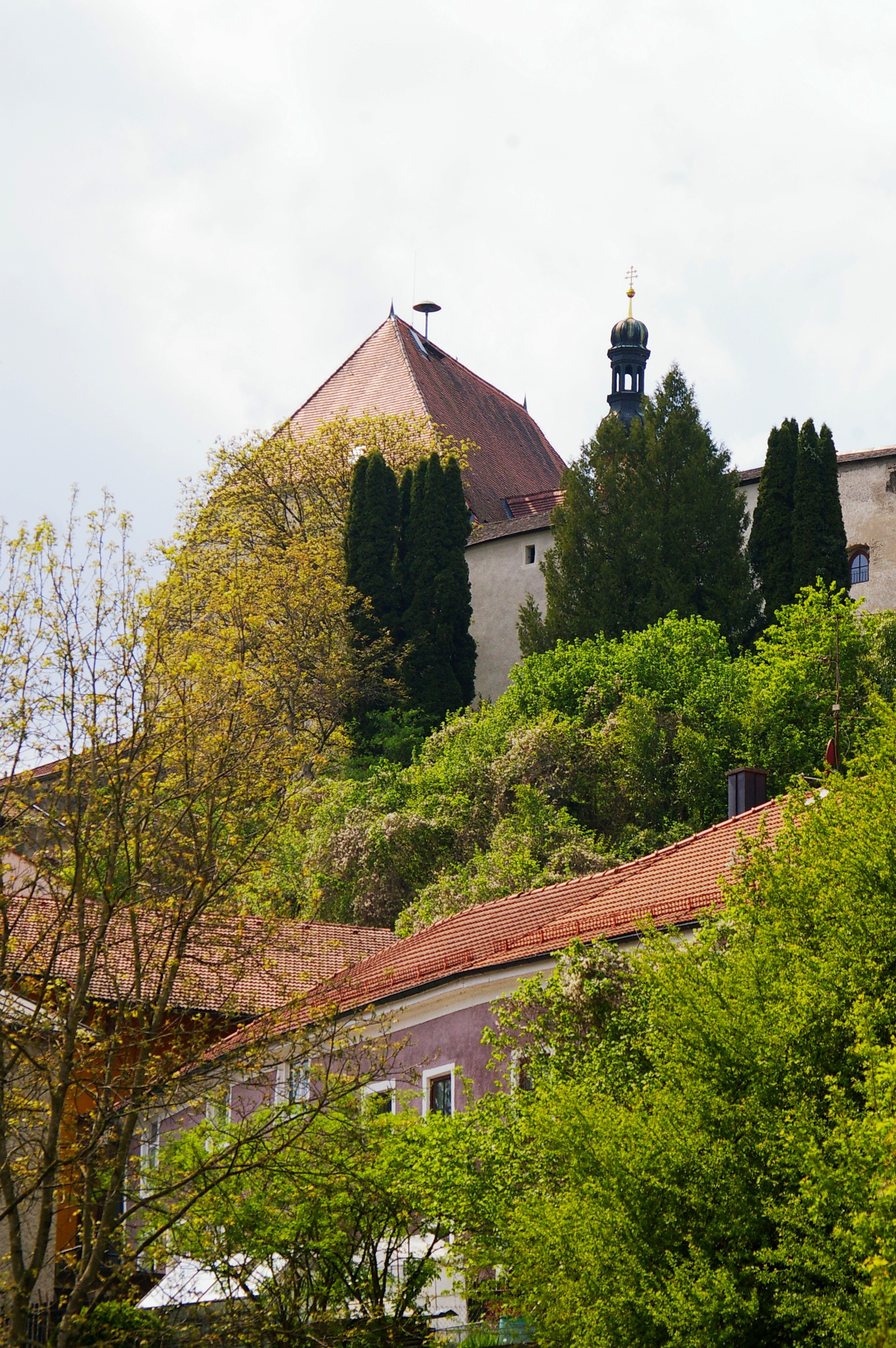
The castle

== Population development ==
Date	Inhabitants
01.12.1871	4010
01.12.1900	4235
16.06.1925	4579
17.05.1939	4269
13.09.1950	6661
06.06.1961	5254
27.05.1970	5222
25.05.1987	4947
31.12.2000	6062
31.12.2005	6151
31.12.2010	6009
31.12.2015	5818

== Personalities and Honorary Citizens ==
- Pope Benedict XVI (1927-2022) lived in Tittmoning between 1929 and 1932 and has been an honorary citizen since 24 January 2007. In front of the home of the Ratzinger family is a sculpture in a bronze memorial plaque.
- Stefan Glowacz (born 1965), born in Tittmoning, professional mountaineer and entrepreneur

== Sources ==
- Freed, John B. “Nobles, Ministerials, and Knights in the Archdiocese of Salzburg.”

Speculum 62, No. 3 (Jul., 1987): 575–611.
