= Pennsylvania Railroad class D7 =

Pennsylvania Railroad D7
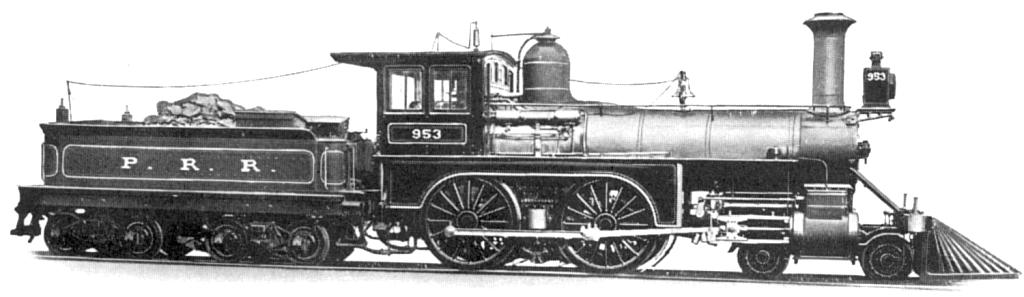
- PRR D7a #953 in its builders' portrait
Type and origin
- Power type: Steam
- Builder: PRR Altoona Works
- Build date: 1882–1891
- Total produced: 58 D7, 61 D7a
Specifications
- Configuration
  - Whyte: 4-4-0
  - UIC: 2′B
- Gauge: 4 ft 8 1/2 in (1,435 mm)
- Leading dia.: 30 in (762 mm) (D7); 33 in (838 mm) (D7a)
- Driver dia.: 68 in (1,727 mm) (D7); 62 in (1,575 mm) (D7a)
- Wheelbase: 22 ft 7 1/2 in (6.90 m)
- Length: 58 ft 0.6 in (17.69 m)
- Height: 14 ft 4 in (4.37 m)
- Axle load: 32,650 lb (14.8 tonnes)
- Adhesive weight: 56,700 lb (25.7 tonnes) (D7); 58,700 lb (26.6 tonnes)
- Loco weight: 93,500 lb (42.4 tonnes) (D7); 96,330 lb (43.7 tonnes) (D7a)
- Total weight: 160,880 lb (73.0 tonnes)
- Fuel type: Anthracite coal
- Fuel capacity: 12,000 lb (5.4 tonnes)
- Water cap.: 2,400 US gal (9,100 L; 2,000 imp gal)
- Firebox
  - Grate area: 34.75 sq ft (3.23 m^{2})
- Boiler pressure: 140 lbf/in^{2} (970 kPa)
- Heating surface
  - Firebox: 155 sq ft (14.40 m^{2})
  - Tubes: 1,134 sq ft (105.35 m^{2})
  - Total surface: 1,289 sq ft (119.75 m^{2})
- Cylinders: 2
- Cylinder size: 17 in × 24 in (432 mm × 610 mm)
- Valve gear: Stephenson
- Valve type: Slide valves
Performance figures
- Tractive effort: 12,138 lbf (53.99 kN) (D7); 13,313 lbf (59.22 kN) (D6a)
- Factor of adh.: 4.7 (D7) 4.4 (D7a)

Class D7 (formerly Class A (anthracite), pre-1895) on the Pennsylvania Railroad was a class of 4-4-0 steam locomotive. Fifty-eight were built by the PRR's Altoona Works (now owned by Norfolk Southern) between 1882–1891 with 68 in (1.73 m) drivers, while sixty-one of class D7a were constructed with 62 in (1.57 m) drivers.

The D7 was fundamentally an anthracite-burning version of the PRR D6, with a larger fire-grate in order to burn the slower-burning, harder coal.
