= Ilag =

Internment camps established by the German Army to hold Allied civilians in World War II

Ilag is an abbreviation of the German word Internierungslager. They were internment camps established by the German Army in World War II to hold Allied civilians, caught in areas that were occupied by the German Army. They included United States citizens caught in Europe by surprise when war was declared in December 1941 and citizens of the British Commonwealth caught in areas engulfed by the Blitzkrieg.

Amongst the internees were British born citizens who were resident in the Channel Islands. In October 1941, Adolf Hitler ordered the internment of 8,000 British, in retaliation for the internment by the British Army of 800 Germans living in Iran. The order was not carried out until it was reissued by Hitler in September 1942. The German commander of the islands, based in Jersey, was ordered to deport to camps in Germany all British citizens not born in the islands. The numbers were reduced, with around 2,200 men, women and children being deported.

== Internment camps in Austria ==
- Ilag XVIII Spittal

== Internment camps in Czechoslovakia ==
- Ilag IV Eisenberg

== Internment camps in France 1940–1944 ==
There were 219 internment camps in France during the Second World War. Several Ilags were set up in France by the German Army to hold citizens of the United Kingdom and the Commonwealth countries that were caught by the rapid advance during the Battle of France. The main camps were:

=== Besançon ===
The camp at Besançon was called Frontstalag 142, or Caserne Vauban. At the end of 1940, 2,400 women, mostly British, were interned in the Vauban barracks and another 500 old and sick in the St. Jacques hospital close by. In early 1941 many of them were released; the rest were transferred to Vittel.

=== Saint-Denis ===
The camp was located in the old barracks built in the middle of the 19th century at Saint-Denis, close to Paris. The camp was opened June 1940 and existed until liberated by the United States Army in August 1944. Part of the grounds were surrounded by barbed wire to provide open space for exercise. In early 1942, there were more than 1,000 male British internees in the camp. The meagre food rations were augmented by the International Red Cross packages, so that, overall, their diet was satisfactory. Life was tolerable because there was a good library and recreation was provided by sports activities and theatre.

=== Vittel ===
Also called Frontstalag 121, this was one of the more hospitable internment camps as it was located in requisitioned hotels in this spa near Epinal in the Department Vosges. Most of the British families and single women were transferred here from St. Denis and Besançon.

In early 1942, women over 60, men over 75 and children under 16 were released. The overall population was thus reduced to about 2,400. The inmates included a number of American families and women. Provisions for recreation included a local theatre and a park with seven tennis courts.

A young New Zealander and two British women escaped in August 1941 and made their way to England.

=== Other camps in France ===
- Ilag Clermont
- Ilag Compiègne
- Ilag Drancy
- Ilag Giromagny
- Ilag Rouen

== Internment camps in Germany World War II ==
=== Ilag V Liebenau ===
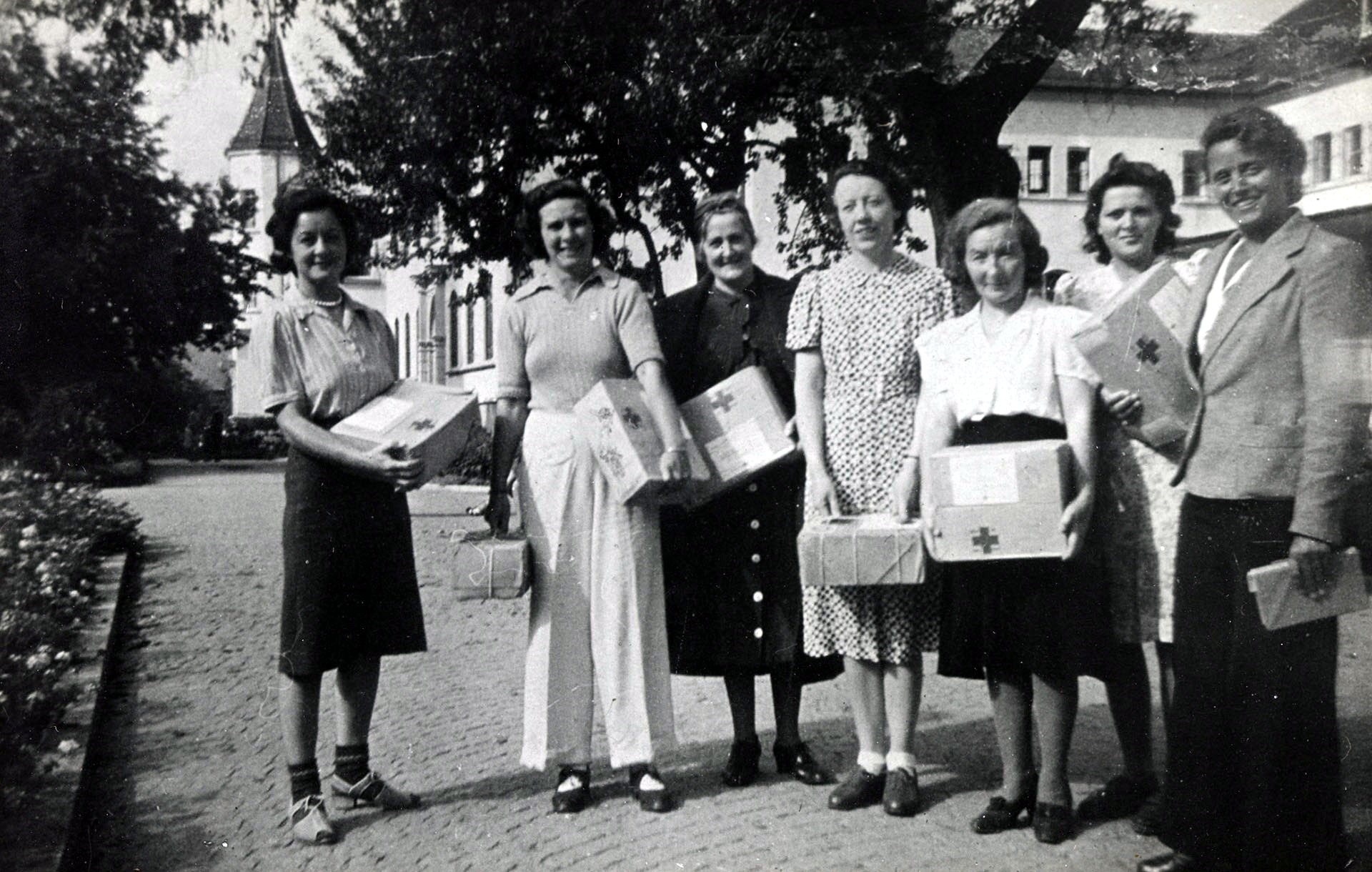
Propaganda photograph showing internees at Liebenau camp with Red Cross care packages, c.1940

A camp in Liebenau, near Meckenbeuren in Württemberg, on Lake Constance, opened in 1940 and operated until 1945. It was in a castle and four adjacent buildings. Previously it had been a mental hospital run by nuns. On Adolf Hitler's orders about 700 of the patients were exterminated by injection under a program retrospectively named Aktion T4.

The first internees were about 300 British citizens from Poland. More British were brought in 1941 from Belgium, Greece, the Netherlands and other countries. Red Cross packages augmented the food rations. The guards were older German veterans of World War I and treated the internees well. Several had been prisoners of war in British camps where they had been treated well. In January 1943 many of the married women were transferred to Vittel (see above).

=== Ilag V-B Biberach ===
Built in 1939 as barracks, this camp became an Ilag accommodating Channel Island families interned as a reprisal for the deportation of German nationals from the Kingdom of Iran to Camp 10 in Loveday, South Australia. The camp was located on a plateau northwest of Biberach an der Riß in southeastern Baden-Württemberg. It consisted of 23 concrete huts that had previously served as Oflag V-B for officers who were prisoner of war. Initially, the camp was administered by the German Army, but in the spring of 1943 the administration was transferred to the Interior Ministry; this caused a worsening of food rations. Otherwise, the International Red Cross considered conditions in the camp to be satisfactory.

In January 1943, the camp held 1,011 internees: 429 men, 437 women, and 145 children.

20 Channel Island civilians died in Biberach.

=== Ilag V-C Wurzach ===
This camp also held Channel Island families. It was located in the town of Bad Wurzach and southeastern Baden-Württemberg. Previously, it had been used as an oflag housing French officers. Conditions were less satisfactory because it was located in a three-story 18th-century castle that had recently been a monastery, and the rooms were dark and damp. 618 internees arrived at the end of October 1942, all of them families. In late 1944 72 Dutch Jews arrived from Bergen-Belsen. Most appeared to have English grandparents. The deportees now learned first hand about conditions elsewhere.

12 Channel Island civilians died in Wurzach.

=== Ilag VII Laufen and Tittmoning ===
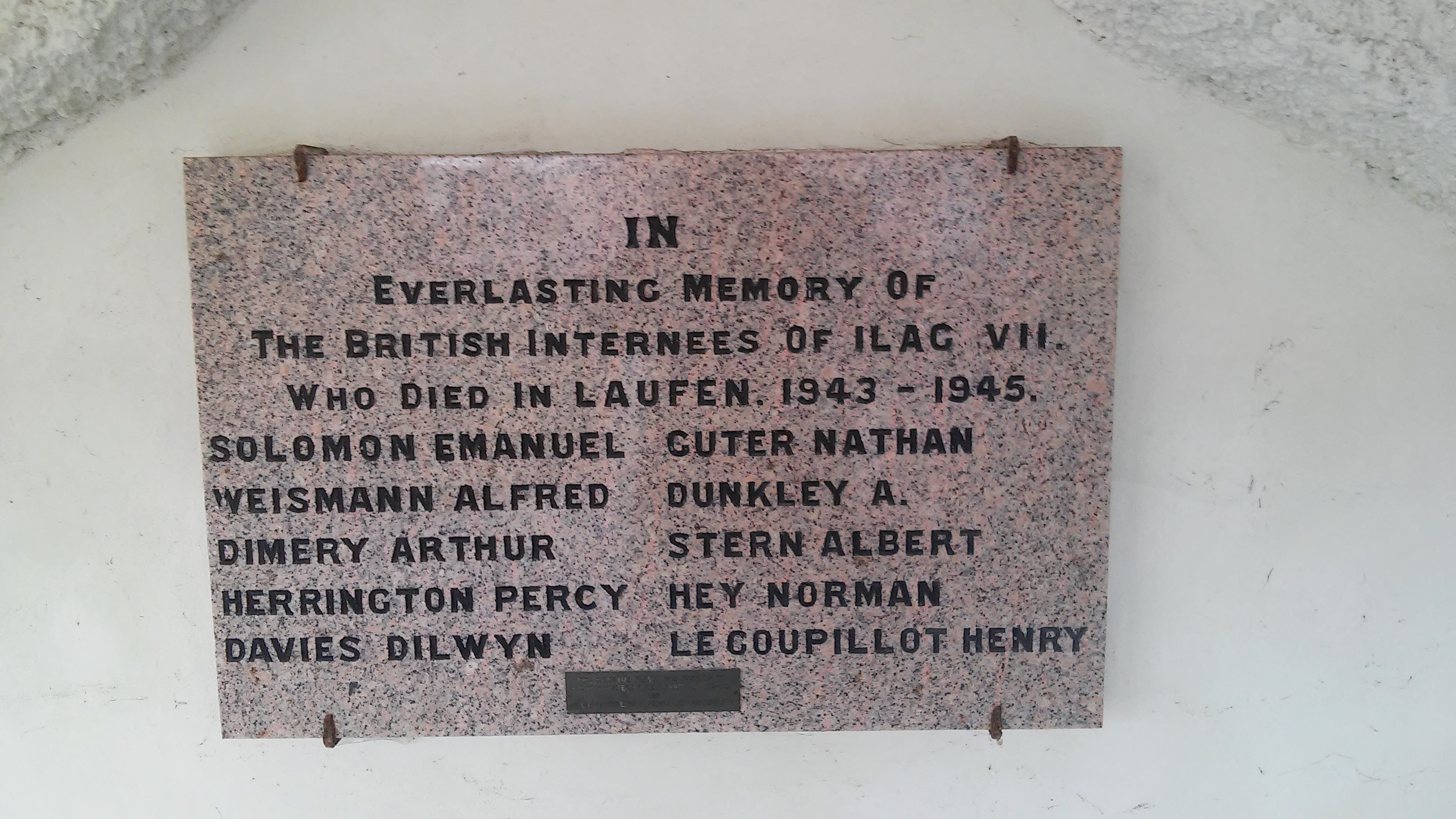
Memorial plate for the internees who died in ILAG VII during WW II. You find the plate at the old cemetery in Laufen.

British and American citizens were interned in Laufen and Tittmoning in Bavaria, on the border with Austria. In September 1942, British single men from the Channel Islands were sent here, where they found some Americans in residence. In 1943, the younger men over 16 who had parents in Biberach or Wurzach were moved to Laufen to release space. These two camps were always administered by the German Army.

Frank Stroobant, the camp senior, was invited in April 1943 to attend an inspection in the forest of Katyn in Russia where a massacre of 22,000, mainly Polish army and police officers, by Soviet forces had been uncovered. He was the only civilian witness at the event From June 1943 the camp senior became Ambrose Sherwill.

Boredom was a major problem. Some internees were permitted to undertake paid work outside camp. The moral view of whether work should be done was strongly debated in the camp, but as everyone was a private individual, it was up to each person to make their own decision.

In April 1944, Laufen held 459 British internees (417 Channel Islanders) and 120 Americans, including Josef Nassy. 10 Channel Island internees died in Laufen during internment.

=== Other camps in Germany ===
- Ilag 6 Bad Godesberg
- Ilag Bad Neuenahr
- Ilag Buchenwald
- Ilag Dachau
- Ilag 6 Dorsten
- Ilag 10 Sandbostel
- Ilag VII/Z Tittmoning
- Ilag 3 Treuenbrietzen
- Ilag XIII Wülzburg

== Internment camps in the Netherlands ==
- Ilag Haaren, North Brabant
- Kamp Sint-Michielsgestel, North Brabant

== Internment camps in Poland ==
- Ilag 21 Chludowo
- Ilag (Oflag 6) Kreuzburg
- Ilag (Stalag 344) Kreuzburg
- Ilag VIII/Z Kreuzburg
- Ilag Tost
- Ilag VIII Tost
- Ilag VIII/H Tost

== Repatriation ==
- At least one small group of internees returned from Laufen to Jersey prior to D-Day in 1944.
- A small number of Guernsey internees, considered too ill to remain in Laufen, were repatriated individually as the occasion arose accompanied by a couple of German soldiers and a Guernsey internee in his capacity as Red Cross representative. The route taken was across occupied France to St Malo where they would embark by boat to Guernsey; the accompanying party would return after a few days.
- After lengthy negotiations in Switzerland, 900 British internees, mostly elderly or ill, were exchanged in Lisbon for a similar number of Germans interned in South Africa in July 1944.
- In September 1944, 125 elderly and infirm Channel Islanders were repatriated on the SS Drottningholm via Sweden to the UK. Following a three-day January trip by the Laufen senior, Ambrose Sherwill to Berlin to meet the Swiss delegation, 24 from Laufen were included in a further 212 being repatriated in April 1945.
- The remainder of the Channel Islanders were repatriated after the camps were liberated by the French Army (Biberach) on 22 April 1945. Wurzach was liberated on 28 April 1945 by a French Moroccan armoured unit who were unaware of the internees. Laufen was liberated on 4 May 1945, by Americans of 40th Armoured Division.

== See also ==
- Internment
- Internment of Japanese Americans
- List of concentration and internment camps
- Deportations from the German-occupied Channel Islands

== Sources ==
- Deportation from Channel Islands
- Commonwealth citizens interned in France p.94
- Conditions in Ilags, p.439
- Story of Armenian woman living in Holland, interned in Libenau, etc
- Das war nicht nur "Karneval im August - by Adler, Reinhold. Biberach 2002 (ISBN 3-9806818-2-3) - in German.
- Das Wurzacher Schloss 1940 - 1945 - by Rothenhäusler, Gisela. Lindenberg 2008 (ISBN 978-3-89870-502-8) - in German
- Channel Island internees who died during internment
