= Laufen Castle (Germany) =

Castle in Bavaria, Germany

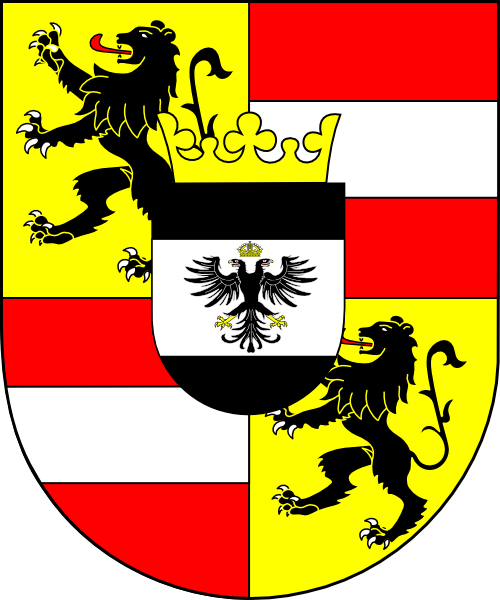
Laufen Castle
- Schloss Laufen
- Laufen in Germany
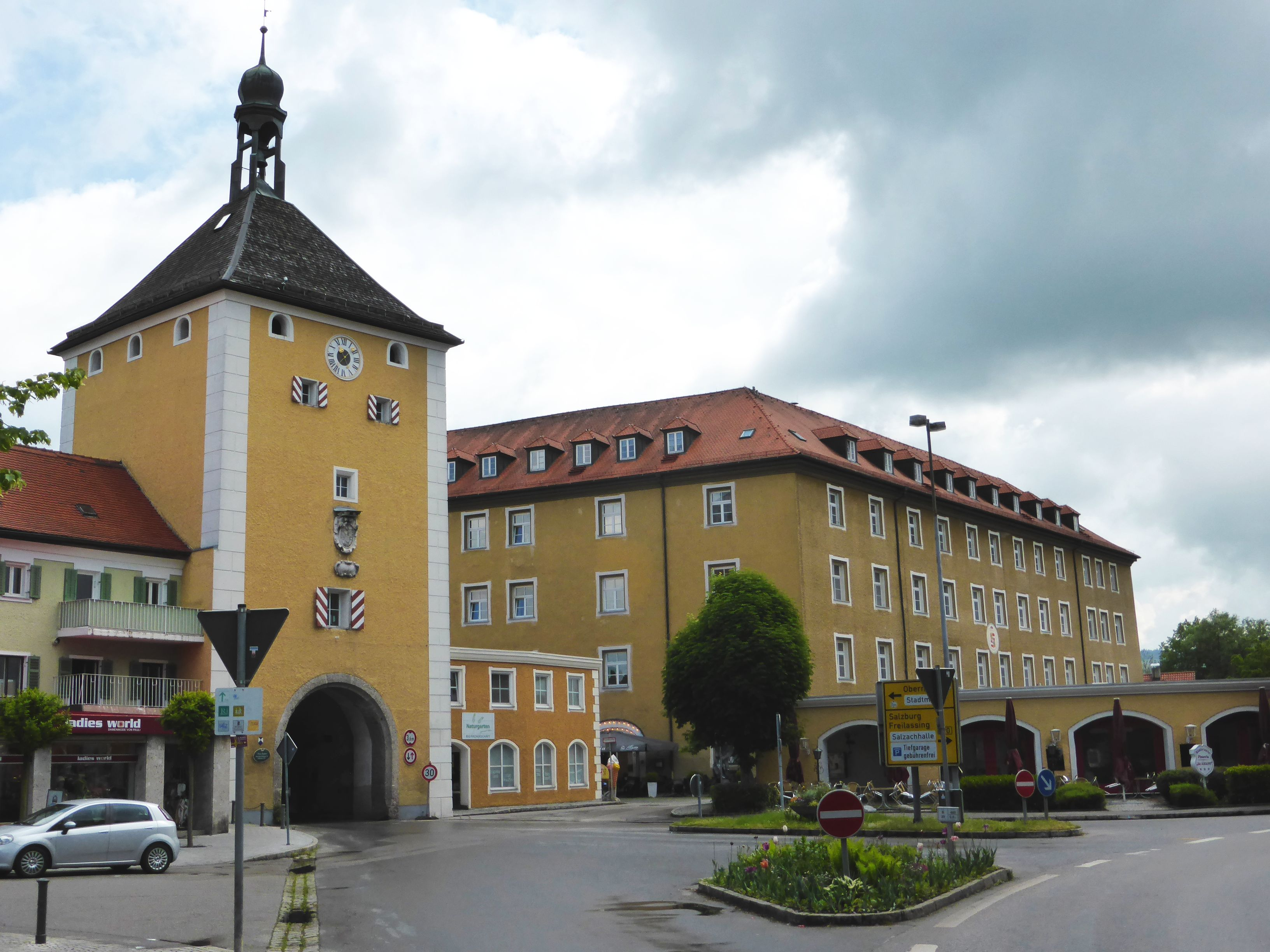

Site information
- Type: Castle
- Condition: Intact

Location
- Coordinates: 47°56′19″N 12°56′12.34″E

Site history
- Built: 15th Century
- In use: 15th Century – 1945
- Events: Second World War

Laufen Castle (German: Schloss Laufen) is a square-shaped castle overlooking the Salzach river that was built for the Archbishop of Salzburg in the 15th century. The castle is located in the town of Laufen in the German state of Bavaria. During the Second World War, it was the site of Oflag VII-C (a prisoner-of-war camp for captured Officers), and later of Ilag VII (an internment camp for men from the Channel Islands).

== History ==
Laufen Castle, which is assumed to be built on the ruins of an ancient Roman structure, was first mentioned in the reign of Bishop Vergilius of Salzburg, and once again in the 13th century. On March 29, 1166, Emperor Barbarossa held court here.

=== Prisoners of war camp ===
During World War II the castle was used first as a prisoner-of-war camp for officers, Oflag VII-C. Then In May 1942 the officers were transferred to another camp, and the castle was used as an internment camp Ilag VII housing some hundreds of men deported from the Channel Islands of Jersey and Guernsey and some American civilians that had been caught in Europe by the declaration of war by Germany on the United States on 11 December 1941.

== Literature ==
- Heinz Schmidbauer: The Changing Functions of the Castle. In: Heinz Dopsch, Hans Roth (eds.): Laufen and Oberndorf. 1250 years history, economy and worship on both banks of the Salzach. S. 198–201. Eigenverlag the city running and the market town of Oberndorf, running 1998 ISBN 3-00-003359-9.

Werner Meyer: Castles in Upper Bavaria – A handbook. Publisher Weidlich, Würzburg, 1986, ISBN 3-8035-1279-4, S. 49th

P.R. Reid, M.B.E., MC.: The Colditz Story' Hodder and Stoughton, 1952

== See also ==
- List of castles
- List of castles in Germany
- Laufen, Germany
- Oflag VII-C
