= Dorothea Weber (humanitarian) =

Jersey humanitarian

Dorothea Weber (née Le Brocq) (14 May 1905 - May 1993) was a Jersey person who sheltered a Jewish woman during the German occupation of the Channel Islands. She was posthumously recognised as Righteous Among the Nations and a British Hero of the Holocaust.

== Life ==
In August 1940 Germany occupied the Channel Islands and in 1941, Dorothea Le Brocq married Anton Weber, an Austrian baker who had been living on Jersey since February 1938. Anton Weber was drafted into the German army in 1942.

Hedwig Goldenberg Bercu, originally from Austria, was registered as Jewish by the German authorities. Bercu worked as an interpreter with a German transport unit. Her job gave her access to petrol coupons, which she apparently smuggled to members of the resistance on the island. After she refused a local’s demand to provide him with coupons, he threatened to denounce her, and she decided to go into hiding. Bercu had attempted to fake her suicide by placing a pile of her clothes with a note on the beach in St Aubin’s Bay.

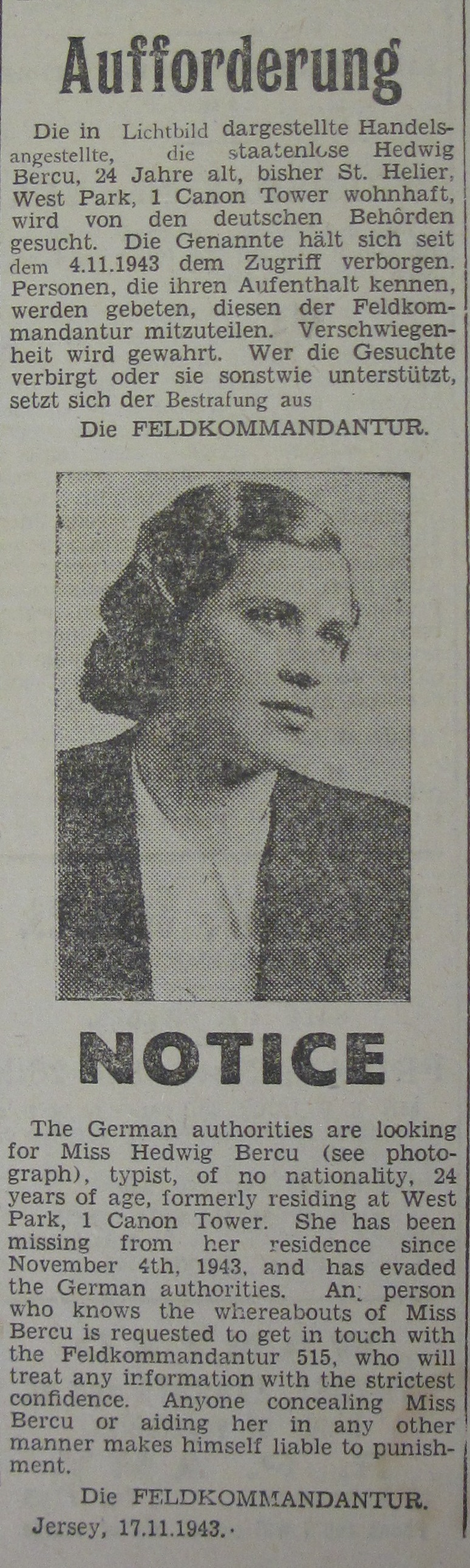
Wanted notice for Hedwig Bercu in the Jersey Evening Post, November 1943

The German authorities put a wanted notice in the local newspaper, the Jersey Evening Post, in November 1943, with Bercu’s photo, asking the public to report her whereabouts and warning that “anyone concealing Miss Bercu or aiding her in any other manner makes himself liable to punishment.”

Dorothea Weber sheltered her Jewish friend Bercu at great personal risk. Bercu stayed in Weber's apartment in St Helier for eighteen months, until the liberation of Jersey in May 1945. The two women survived on Weber’s rations, food brought by German officer, Kurt Rümmele, and game and fish caught at night.

When the war ended, Bercu registered again with the authorities and declared that she had been living in hiding with Mrs Weber, at 7 West Park Avenue in St Helier for 18 months. Bercu married Rümmele, and the two settled in Germany.

Believing her husband had died in the war, Weber inadvertently committed bigamy by marrying, in August 1945, Francis Flanagan, one of the British soldiers who had liberated Jersey. After her lawful husband returned from Soviet captivity, in 1949 Dorothea and Francis Flanagan were brought back to the island to stand trial for bigamy; she was given a suspended sentence.

Dorothea returned to England after the trial. She died in May 1993, aged 82, and her ashes were scattered in the memorial gardens of Worthing.

== Legacy ==
In February 2016 Weber was awarded the Righteous Among the Nations honour by Yad Vashem. This is an honour bestowed on non-Jewish people who risked their lives to save Jews during the Holocaust.

In January 2018, she was honoured as a British Hero of the Holocaust. Recipients of the honour in 2010 had included four people from Jersey: Albert Bedane, Louisa Gould, Ivy Forster and Harold Le Druillenec.
