= Albert Bedane =

Jersey activist (1893–1980)

Albert Gustave Bedane
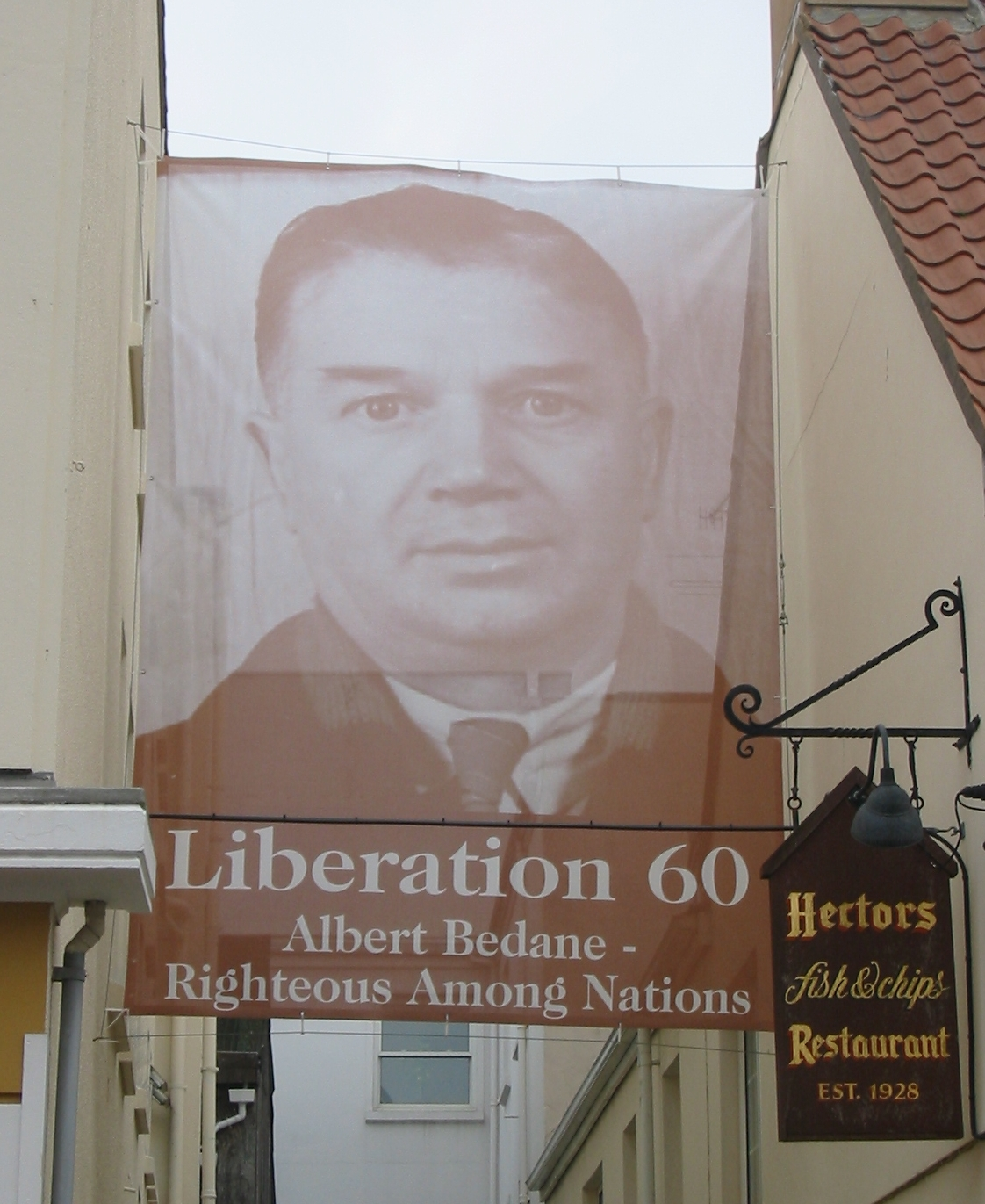
- Portrait of Albert Bedane displayed on a banner in St Helier to mark the 60th anniversary of the Liberation
- Born: 1893; Angers, France
- Died: 1980 (aged 86–87)
- Citizenship: British
- Occupation: masseur/physiotherapist
- Known for: British Hero of the Holocaust; Righteous Among the Nations

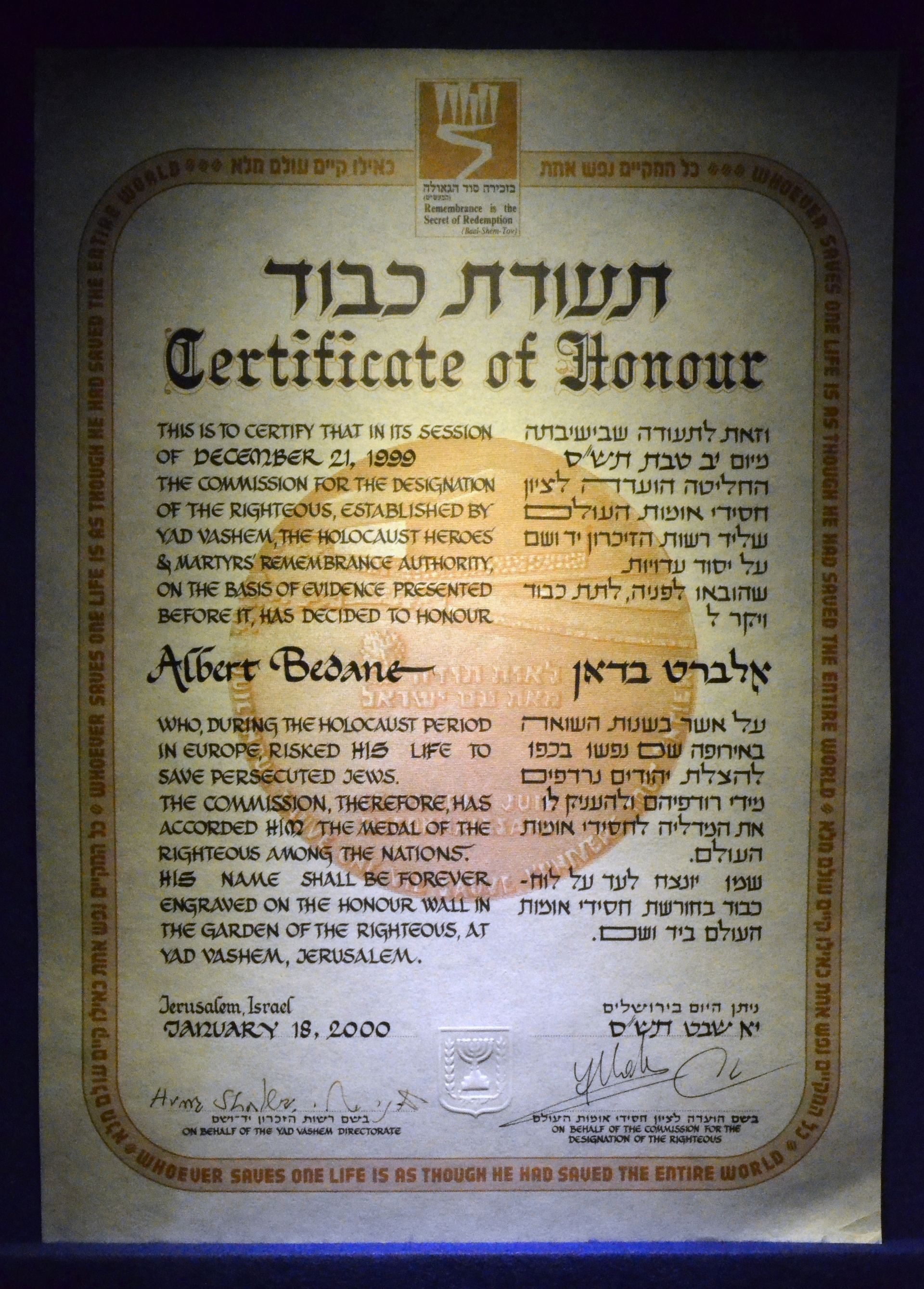
Righteous Among the Nations certificate for Bedane

Albert Gustave Bedane (1893–1980) lived in Jersey during the German occupation during World War II, and provided shelter to a Jewish woman and others, preventing their capture by the Nazis. In 2010, Bedane was posthumously named a British Hero of the Holocaust.

== Life ==
Albert Bedane was born in Angers in France in 1893 and lived in Jersey from 1894. He served in the British Army, 1917-1920, and was naturalised as a British subject by the Royal Court of Jersey in 1921. By profession he was a masseur/physiotherapist, running a physiotherapy clinic from his home in Roseville Street, St Helier.

During the German occupation of the Channel Islands, some of the Germans came to his clinic for treatment. Bedane was also using his home to shelter an escaped French prisoner of war, three escaped Soviet slave labourers and a Dutch Jewish woman, Mrs Mary Richardson, who was married to a local man, Captain Richardson. For 2 1/2 years, Mary Richardson lived in the cellar and attic of Bedane's house. Beneath his clinic there was a three-roomed cellar, which he used to shelter those who had sought refuge. By asking for payment in food rather than money from his clients, Bedane managed to feed everyone without arousing suspicion.

== Recognition ==
In 1966 the Soviet government presented Albert Bedane (along with other Jersey resistance activists who had helped and sheltered escaped Soviet slave-workers) with a gold watch. On 4 January 2000, Albert Bedane was posthumously recognised as Righteous Among the Nations.

In 2004 BBC South West launched an audience vote for South West Heroes. The four nominations from Jersey, which falls within the BBC's South West broadcasting region, were Gerald Durrell, Sir Walter Ralegh, Sir Billy Butlin and Bedane.

On 9 March 2010 the award of British Hero of the Holocaust was made to 25 individuals, including four Jerseymen, by the United Kingdom government in recognition of UK citizens who assisted in rescuing victims of the Holocaust. The Jersey recipients were Louisa Gould, Ivy Forster, Harold Le Druillenec and Bedane. It was, according to historian Freddie Cohen, the first time that the UK Government recognised the heroism of Jersey islanders during the German occupation.

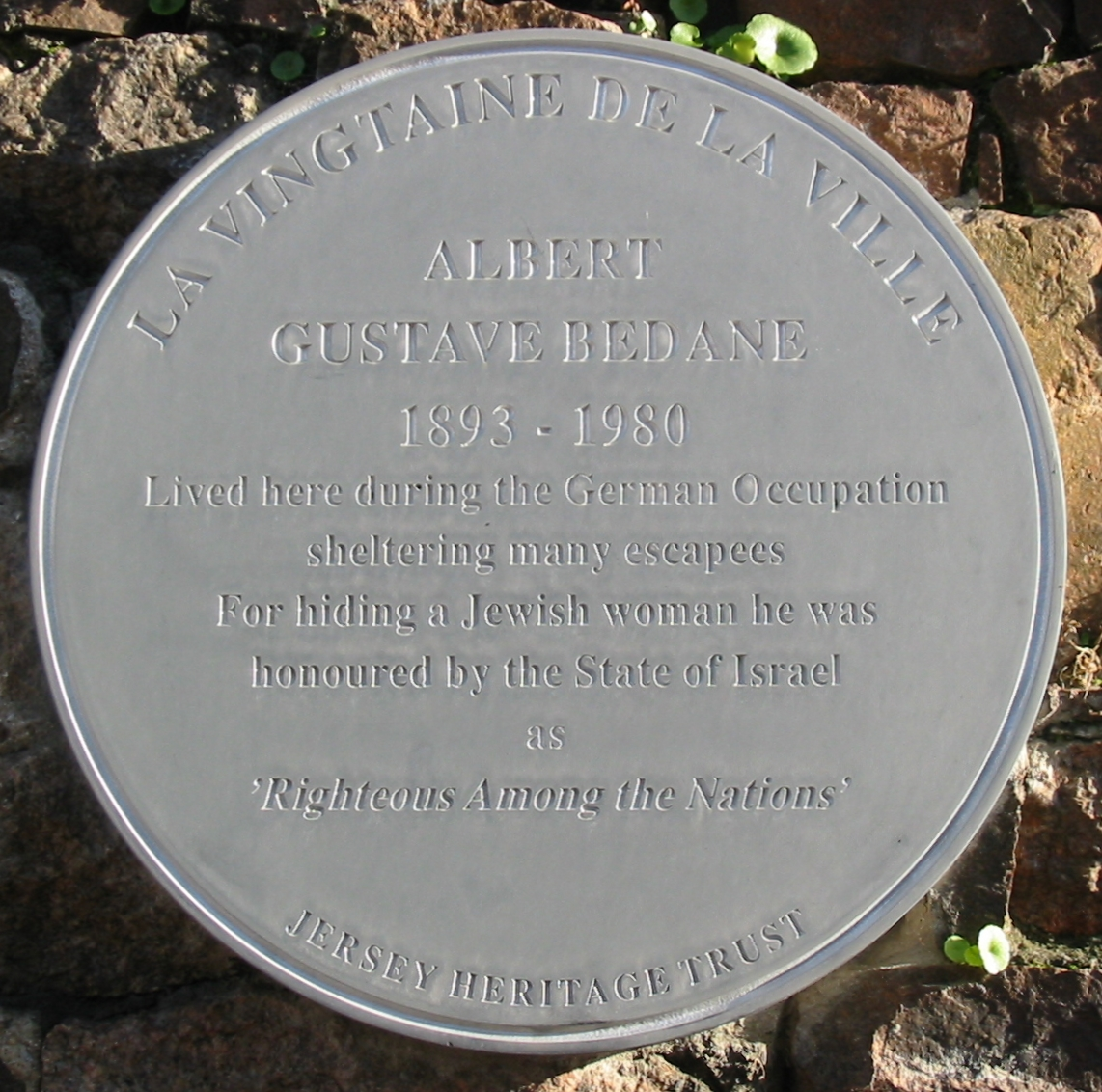
Plaque in Roseville Street at the site where Albert Bedane sheltered escapees

The Righteous Among the Nations medal and certificate are on display in the Occupation Tapestry Gallery at the Jersey Maritime Museum on New North Quay.

A plaque erected by the Vingtaine de la Ville marks the site of his home in Roseville Street, St Helier, where he sheltered escapees.
