= Louisa Gould =

British resistance member

Louisa Gould

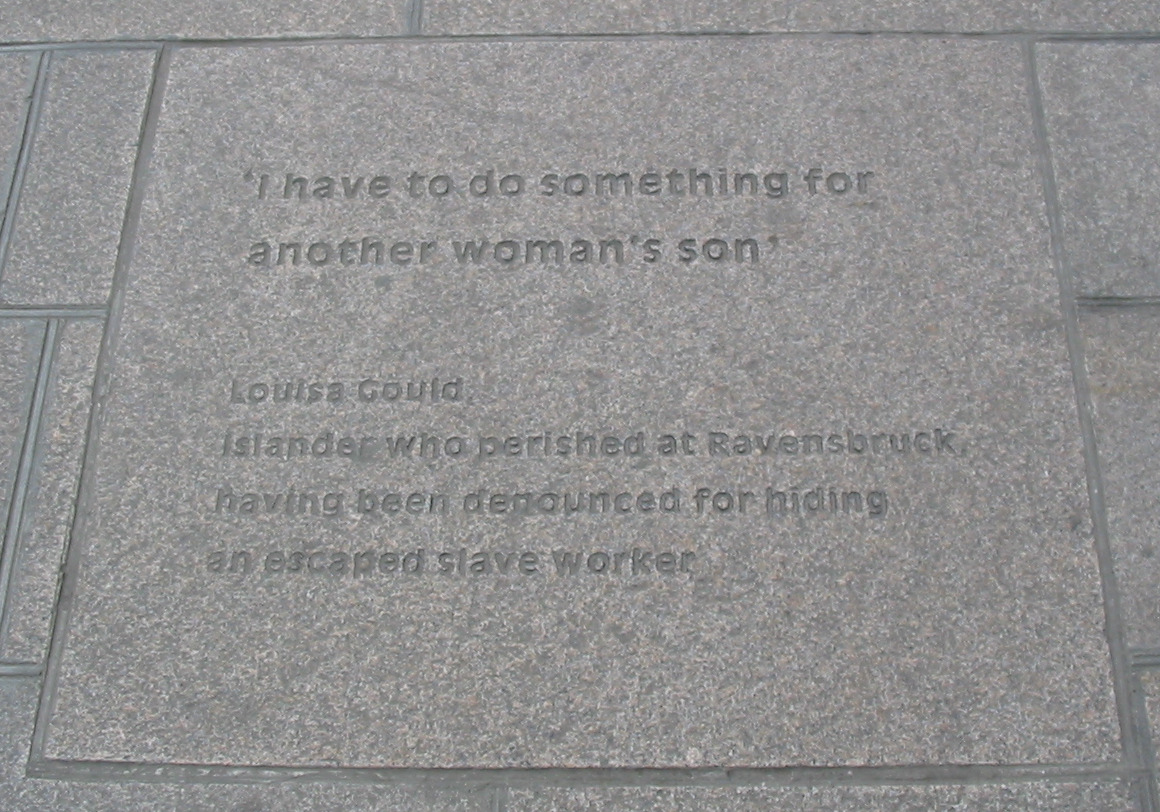
A plaque commemorating Louisa Gould's resistance to Nazi occupying forces in Jersey during World War II

Louisa Mary Gould (née Le Druillenec; 7 October 1891 – 13 February 1945) was a Jersey shopkeeper and a member of the resistance in the Channel Islands during World War II. From 1942 until her arrest in 1944, Gould sheltered an escaped Soviet forced labourer known as Fyodor Polycarpovich Buriy on the island of Jersey. Following a trial, she was sent to the Ravensbrück concentration camp where she was killed in 1945.

Gould was posthumously named a British Hero of the Holocaust in 2010.

== Life ==
Gould was born Louisa Eva Le Druillenec in St Ouen, Jersey, on 7 October 1891. She was one of nine children of the seaman Vincent Le Druillenec. For most of her life she ran a grocery store at La Fontaine, Millais in St Ouen.

Gould had two sons, Ralph and Edward, both of whom enlisted in the British armed forces during World War II. Edward, an officer in the Royal Navy Volunteer Reserve, was killed in action on HMS Bonaventure in March 1941.

== Resistance ==
During World War II and the German occupation of the Channel Islands, the Nazis used captured Soviet servicemen as forced labour.

Both Louisa Gould and her sister Ivy Forster sheltered escaped Soviet forced labourers. Beginning in late 1942, Gould hid an escaped forced labourer, Fyodor Polycarpovich Buriy, a pilot captured after his aircraft had been shot down. Aware of the severe penalties for harbouring enemies of the Germans, Gould said simply, "I have to do something for another mother's son." Gould hid Buriy inside her St Ouen home for 18 months.

== Arrest, trial and death ==
In 1944 a letter informing the Germans about Gould sheltering a Russian was intercepted. Buriy, whom she called 'Bill', was moved to the house of her sister Ivy Forster. In June 1944, the German Geheime Feldpolizei searched her house and found evidence of his stay at Gould's home. They found a scrap of paper that had been used as a Christmas gift tag, addressed to Buriy, and a Russian–English dictionary that he had used for practising his English. Gould was arrested on 25 May and Ivy a week later. Buriy managed to avoid capture until the liberation of Jersey. Their brother Harold Le Druillenec was later arrested as he had been seen visiting Gould. All three were convicted. Gould was sentenced to two years in prison for harbouring Buriy, and for the possession of a radio which she had kept despite regulations requiring her to hand it in. Gould and her brother Harold were initially jailed in France then sent to Nazi concentration camps. Ivy was spared deportation on health grounds after a doctor pretended that she was suffering from tuberculosis; she instead served her prison sentence of five months and fifteen days in Jersey.

Gould was sent to the Ravensbrück concentration camp. She was murdered in the gas chamber at Ravensbrück on 13 February 1945, two months before the camp's liberation.

Harold Le Druillenec was one of only two British survivors of the Bergen-Belsen concentration camp.

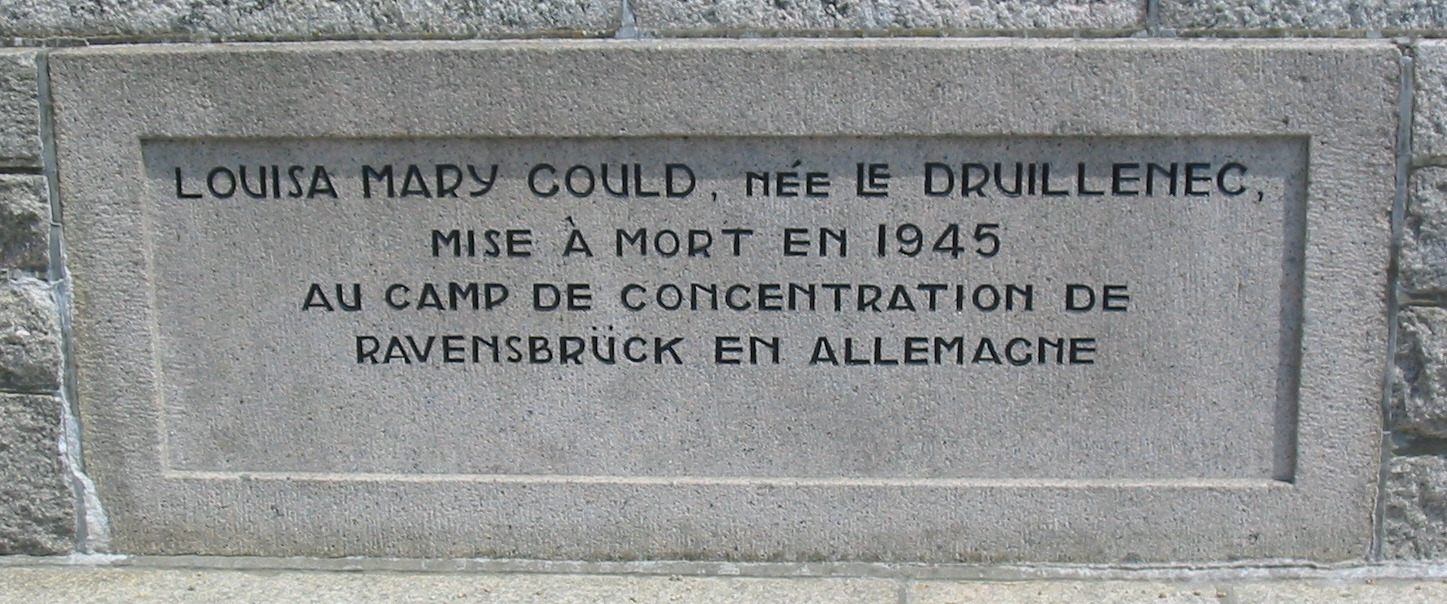
A plaque in St Ouen, Jersey, commemorates Louisa Gould's death.

== Recognition ==
In 1995 a memorial plaque was unveiled in St Ouen, Jersey; Buriy, the former forced labourer from what had been the USSR, as well as Gould's son, Ralph, attended its unveiling. It was at this event that the two met for the first time.

On 9 March 2010 the award of British Hero of the Holocaust was made to 25 individuals posthumously, including four Jerseymen, by the United Kingdom government in recognition of UK citizens who assisted in rescuing victims of the Holocaust. The Jersey recipients were Gould, Ivy Forster, Harold Le Druillenec and Albert Bedane. It was, according to historian Freddie Cohen, the first time that the UK Government recognised the heroism of Jersey islanders during the German occupation.

== Film ==
Gould's story is depicted in the 2017 film Another Mother's Son, based on a script by Jenny Lecoat, Gould's great-niece. Gould was portrayed by Jenny Seagrove.
