= Another Mother's Son =

2017 British film by Christopher Menaul

- Theatrical release poster
- Directed by: Christopher Menaul
- Written by: Jenny Lecoat
- Produced by: Bill Kenwright; Daniel-Konrad Cooper
- Starring: Jenny Seagrove; Julian Kostov; Ronan Keating; John Hannah; Amanda Abbington
- Production company: Bill Kenwright Films
- Distributed by: Vertigo Films
- Release date: 16 March 2017 (London)
- Country: United Kingdom
- Language: English

Another Mother's Son is a 2017 British war drama film directed by Christopher Menaul, written by Jenny Lecoat, and starring Jenny Seagrove, Julian Kostov, Ronan Keating, John Hannah, and Amanda Abbington.

The film is based on a true story from the German occupation of the Channel Islands, about a Jersey woman named Louisa Gould, who takes in an escaped young Russian war prisoner.

== Premise ==
Louisa Gould hides an escaped young Russian forced labourer, Fyodor Buriy, played by Julian Kostov, from the German forces occupying Jersey during World War II, assisted by her sister Ivy Forster and her brother Harold Le Druillenec.

== Cast ==
- Jenny Seagrove as Louisa Gould
- Julian Kostov as Fyodor "Bill" Buriy
- Ronan Keating as Harold Le Druillenec
- John Hannah as Arthur Forster
- Amanda Abbington as Ivy Forster
- Brenock O'Connor as Rex Forster
- Peter Wight as René Le Mottée
- Susan Hampshire as Elena Le Fevre
- Félicité Du Jeu as Nicole
- Gwen Taylor as Lily Vibert
- Joanna David as Maud Vibert

== Production ==
Christopher Menaul directed the film based on the script by Jenny Lecoat, Louisa Gould's great-niece. Bill Kenwright's Bill Kenwright Films produced the film with Daniel-Konrad Cooper.

Principal photography on the film began on 9 November 2015 in Bath, Somerset. Filming also took place at the town's historic building Guildhall and West London Film Studios.

== Release ==
The World Premiere Charity Gala was held in London at the Odeon Leicester Square on 16 March 2017.

=== Critical reception ===
On review aggregator website Rotten Tomatoes, the film has an approval rating of 50% based on 16 reviews, and an average rating of 5.5/10. On Metacritic, the film has a weighted average score of 50 out of 100, based on 4 critics, indicating "mixed or average reviews".
