= Norman Le Brocq =

Jersey politician (1922–1996)

- Born: 8 January 1922; Jersey
- Died: 26 November 1996 (aged 74); Jersey
- Citizenship: United Kingdom
- Organization: Transport and General Workers' Union
- Known for: Resisting German occupation of the Channel Islands; Creating Jersey's first Island Plan; Trade Union & Communist activism Activist, Jersey Communist Party (JCP); Activist, Jersey Democratic Movement (JDM)
- Notable work: Jersey Looks Forward (1946)
- Title: State Deputy of Jersey
- Term: 1966-1969, 1972-1975, 1978-1987
- Political party: Communist Party of Great Britain (CPGB); Jersey Communist Party (JCP); Jersey Democratic Movement (JDM)
- Opponent: Nazi Party
- Spouse: Rosalie Le Riche
- Awards: Gold watch (1966) – awarded by the USSR for his role in aiding Soviet POWs.

Norman Le Brocq (8 January 1922 – 26 November 1996) was a communist, trade union activist, and a leader of a Jersey resistance cell opposed to the German occupation of the Channel Islands during World War II. The resistance cell distributed anti-fascist propaganda throughout Jersey and sheltered slave labourers who had escaped from German captivity. After the liberation of France by the allied forces, a German soldier connected with Le Brocq and they began planning a mutiny against the German commanders on the islands. However, the war ended before the mutiny could be attempted. After the war, Le Brocq became a human rights activist, campaigning for the introduction of a minimum wage, equitable divorce laws, compulsory school education and health insurance. He also won several elections throughout the 1960s and 70s to serve as a Jersey State Deputy. He was a lifelong member of the Communist Party of Great Britain (CPGB).

Le Brocq was bitter towards Jersey's government and police, who had gone unpunished despite collaborating with the German occupiers in deporting to German prisons 2,400 people who were not native to the Channel Islands. Whilst his participation in the resistance went unrecognised by the British government, many officials who had collaborated with the Nazis were awarded OBE titles and knighthoods.

== Early life ==
Born in Jersey in 1922 and the son of a florist, Le Brocq grew up on the island. As a boy, he was granted a scholarship to Victoria College. He became involved in politics during his time at the college and was a supporter of the International Brigades during the Spanish Civil War. During his teenage years, he became a stonemason and a trade union activist for the Transport and General Workers' Union, a fact he would have to hide during WWII after the German occupational forces outlawed trade unions. At some point before the occupation, Le Brocq had joined the Communist Party of Great Britain (CPGB) before WWII.

== Resisting the German occupation of Jersey ==
Le Brocq was 18 years old when the Germans occupied Jersey, and was one of three young communist activists belonging to the CPGB who did not evacuate Jersey before the occupation. The other two activists were Les Huelin and Stella Perkins, both of whom joined Brocq to set up a clandestine anti-Nazi resistance cell (one of the first cells to be organised) to disrupt the German occupation of Jersey. This cell became known as the Jersey Communist Party (JCP). Following the communist strategy of forming united fronts with non-communists to oppose imperialism, Le Brocq helped establish the Jersey Democratic Movement (JDM), an umbrella network which encompassed all organised anti-Nazi resistance in Jersey. Although the JCP remained at the centre of the resistance movement, many of its activities relied on the work of non-communists.

Using a Gestetner duplicator hidden in his great-aunt's attic, Le Brocq was able to secretly circulate news concerning the war without alerting the German forces and Jersey's collaborationist authorities. When the Nazis brought both Soviet and Spanish Republican POWs to Germany to build the Atlantic Wall, Le Brocq's resistance cell translated into Russian the news of Soviet Red Army victories in Kursk and Stalingrad to improve their morale. To further increase the morale of Soviet POWs, they printed and distributed bulletins in Russian. Le Brocq and his group also assisted a few forced labourers who escaped from the Germans.

Eventually, Le Brocq was able to make contact with a German soldier called Paul Malbach (Mühlbach), whose father had been murdered by the Nazis in Dachau concentration camp. Le Brocq and Malbach made plans to organize a mutiny of German soldiers in May 1945, but the plan was overtaken by events when Adolf Hitler committed suicide in April and the war ended shortly thereafter.

== Post-WWII and later life ==
=== Recognition controversy and awards ===
Unlike in the rest of Europe, the liberation of the Channel Islands did not result in the honouring of the resistance and the punishment of Nazi collaborators, a fact which left Brocq feeling bitter towards the local police who had "helped the Germans round up non-natives for internment in Germany.″ According to several historians, Le Brocq became "an embarrassment as a guilty conscience of the misdeeds of so many." Despite winning multiple elections throughout the 1960s and 70s to become a State Deputy, Le Brocq suffered heavy discrimination by many Jersey residents for his communist beliefs and was blacklisted by many of the island's employers. Many other known members of the JDM resistance cells also found it difficult to find employment, and were subjected to a "McCarthy style witch hunt". The houses of many JDM members were targeted by vandals who painted them with Hammer and Sickles, and in some cases, rotten vegetables were thrown at these former anti-Nazi resistors during public gatherings. Despite lacking widespread recognition in Jersey for his role as a leader of the island's anti-Nazi resistance, his efforts were remembered fondly by both the Soviet Union and by several Spanish Republican POWs who chose to stay in Jersey after the defeat of the Axis.

In 1960, Le Brocq invited the crew of the Soviet timber ship Jarensk to visit the site of mass graves in Westmount near Saint Helier, belonging to Soviet POWs killed by the Germans. The sailors donated money for the creation of a monument, and a memorial ceremony led by Spanish Republican leader Francisco Font was held annually at the site. In 1966, the Soviet Union honoured nineteen members of the resistance, including Le Brocq, by awarding them gold watches. After the war, some of the Russians who had been sheltered by Le Brocq's resistance cell were able to reconnect with former cell members, one of whom was communist activist Stella Perkins.

=== Post-WWII activism and political career ===
Le Brocq spent the remainder of his life campaigning for working-class rights in housing and social policy and was the Communist Party's leading figure in the Channel Islands. After unsuccessful bids for election in the 1960s, he was elected to the States of Jersey in 1966. He remained in the States as a Deputy for Saint Helier until his retirement in 1987.

In 1969 Le Brocq toured the Soviet Union, visiting Leningrad, Stalingrad, Moscow, and spent two weeks at a Black Sea resort in Yalta.

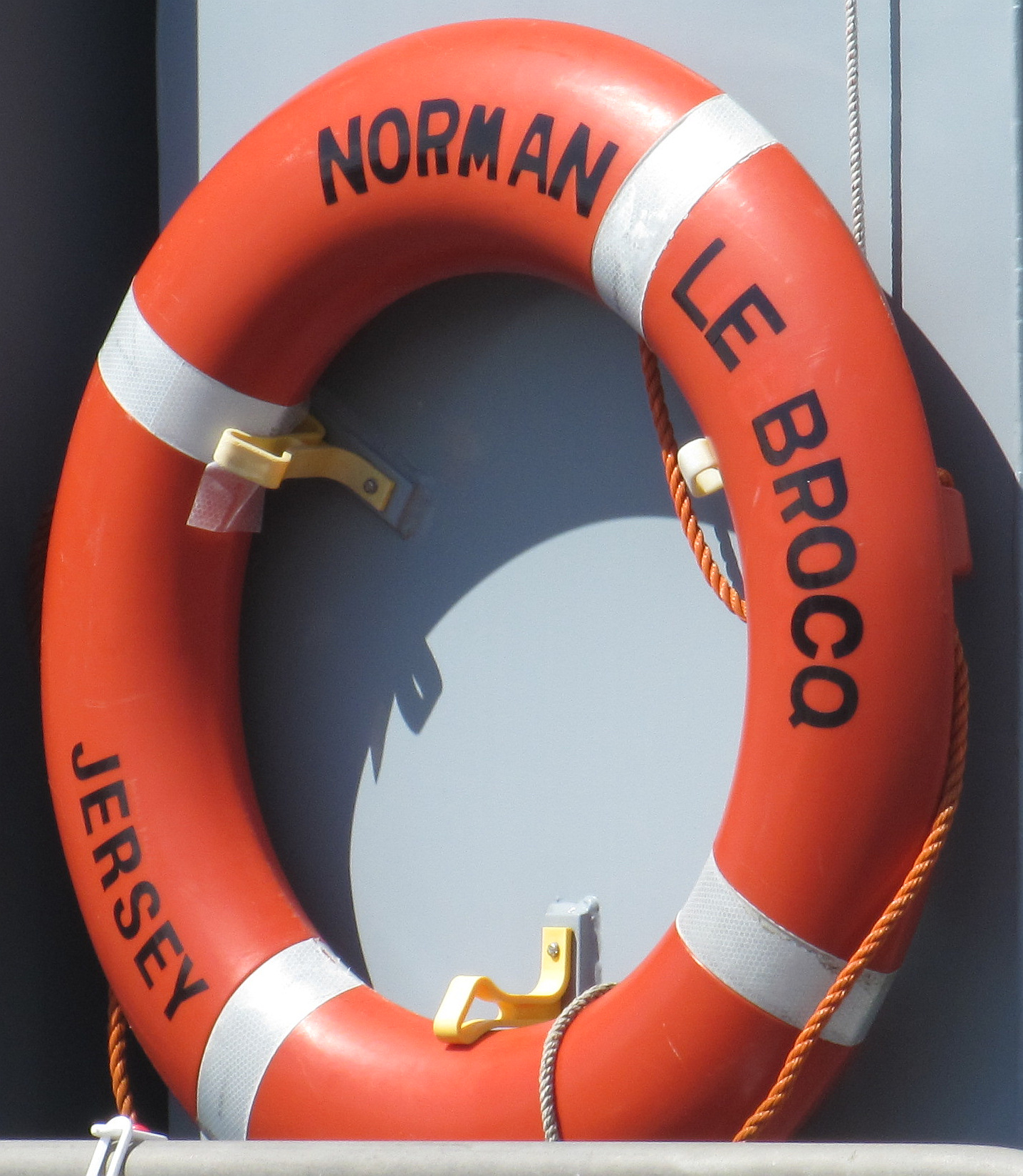
Lifebelt of the Norman Le Brocq, States fisheries vessel

He was president of the Island Development Committee (IDC) and instrumental in bringing in the first Island Plan, which laid out zones for housing and commercial development and greenfield sites on which development was not permitted. He was also chairman of the Sea Fisheries Advisory Committee, and a Sea Fisheries vessel is named after him, which was also present among the Thames flotilla during the Diamond Jubilee.

Outside of the States, he was a director of the Channel Islands Co-operative Society for 35 years, 27 of which he served as its president. He died on 26 November 1996, at age 74.

The political papers of Norman Le Brocq (JA/1231) are held by the Jersey Archives, after being donated/deposited there by the Jersey Heritage Trust.

== Social policies ==
In his 1946 book Jersey Looks Forward, Le Brocq enumerated the political and social policies he advocated, many of which were later adopted by the States of Jersey. These included:

- States members to receive adequate remuneration
- A modern equitable divorce law
- An augmented paid police force acting over the whole island
- Compulsory health insurance
- Compulsory free education to the age of 16
- A maximum working week
- A minimum wage

== Works ==
- Le Brocq, N. S: Jersey Looks Forward, with a Foreword by Harry Pollitt. Published by the Communist Party, 16 King Street, London, WC2, 12 September 1946.

== See also ==
- Bill Alexander
- Vic Allen
- Thora Silverthorne
- Ralph Winston Fox
- Benjamin Francis Bradley
