= Paul Sanders (historian) =

British academic and historian

Paul Sanders (born 23 September 1967) is a British academic, focusing on contemporary history and leadership studies. He is a full-time professor in theDepartment of Strategy at NEOMA Business School, Reims, France. His teaching interests lie in the areas of leadership, ethics and international relations, and he is a media commentator on Russian and European affairs.

== Writings ==
In his thematic history The British Channel Islands under German Occupation 1940–1945 (2005) Sanders provided an account of the experience, including economics and ethics. This publication followed upon a previous work on the occupation of Jersey, tilted The Ultimate Sacrifice (1998). This book's findings were cited in the decision to recognize Channel Islanders with posthumous 'British Heroes of the Holocaust' awards, in 2010. In 2023-24 Sanders was chair and report compiler of the Lord Pickles Alderney Expert Review.

Sanders has also written a history of the black market in Nazi-occupied France (2001 Histoire du marché noir: 1940–1946) and 2014 Protest, Defiance and Resistance in the Channel Islands: German Occupation, 1940–45, which was co-written with two other authors. His recent research focus has shifted to History and Leadership studies, on which he published five articles in the academic journal Leadership.
