= Jersey Communist Party =

Defunct political party in Jersey

Jersey Communist Party Parti Commeuniste de Jèrri
- Leader: Norman Le Brocq
- Founded: 1942
- Dissolved: 1970s
- Preceded by: Jersey Democratic Movement
- Headquarters: 30 Hue Street, St Helier
- Ideology: Marxism-Leninism; Stalinism; Jersey Independence
- Political position: Far-left
- National affiliation: Communist Party of Great Britain
- Regional affiliation: Jersey Democratic Movement
- Colors: Red

The Jersey Communist Party was a political party on the island of Jersey. The JCP seems to have had a semi-autonomous relation to the Communist Party of Great Britain.

During the Second World War, when Jersey was under Nazi occupation, the JCP-leader Norman Le Brocq led a resistance group called Jersey Democratic Movement. The resistance helped many of the Soviet forced labourers that the Germans had brought to the island. JDM, the JCP and Transport and General Workers’ Union distributed propaganda. With the aid of a German deserter, Paul Mulbach, they apparently had some success in turning the soldiers of the garrison against their masters, including most notably the highest military authority in the Islands, Huffmeier. There is some evidence to suggest that they had even set a date for this mutiny (1 May 1945), but that it was rendered pointless by the suicide of Adolf Hitler.

Peter Tabb suggests that they were involved in the blowing up of the Palace Hotel and of separate ammo dumps, in fact it is more likely that their involvement was to set fire to the hotel, and the German efforts to put out the subsequent blaze, by using dynamite to create a breach between the flames were misjudged and set off charges in a neighbouring ammo dump. Nevertheless, the JCP do seem to have made many plans for organised resistance.

After the war Norman Le Brocq was elected deputy in Jersey in 1972. He was twice reelected and sat on a ministerial committee.

In 1966, Le Brocq and 19 other islanders were awarded gold watches by the Soviet Union as a sign of gratitude for their role in the resistance movement.

Le Brocq led the Fishery Advisory Committee until his death.

After his death, a fishing vessel was named after Le Brocq. There is also a Community Worker award named after him.

The date at which JCP dissolved is unclear. There was also a Communist Party of Guernsey, based in 6 Burnt Lane in Saint Peter Port, which was led by Robert G. Hale in 1948, though they seemed to have enjoyed even less electoral success and are also a defunct political entity.
