= Freddie Cohen =

British businessman and politician (1957-2021)

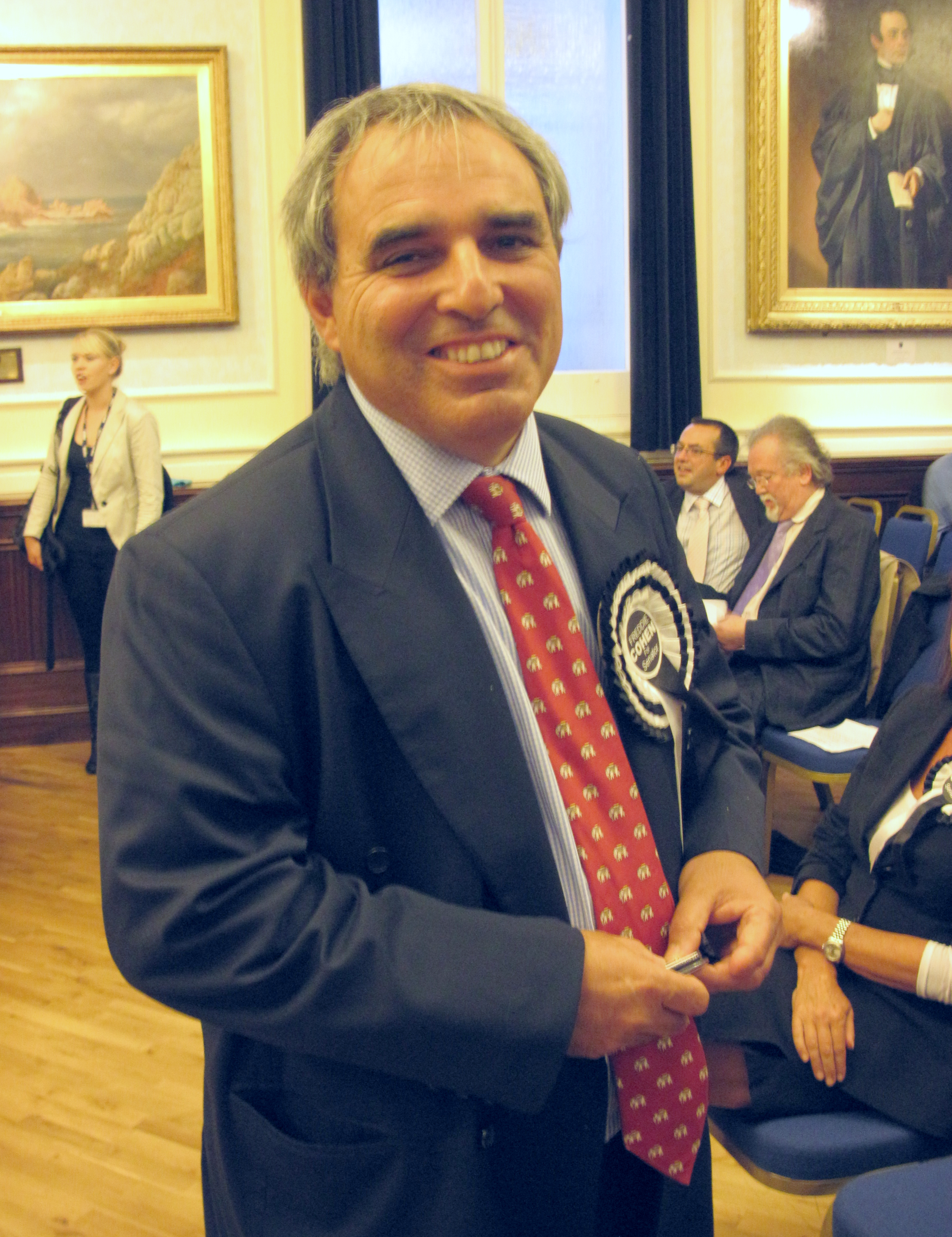

Senator
- In office Oct 2005 – Nov 2011
- Constituency: Jersey
- Majority: 13,704

Planning Minister
- In office Dec 2005 – June 2011
- Succeeded by: Rob Duhamel

Assistant Chief Minister, UK and International Relations
- In office January 2011 – November 2011

Personal details
- Born: 1957 England
- Died: 5 December 2021 (aged 63–64) Jersey
- Party: None
- Children: Emily Cohen, Harry Cohen, Charlie Cohen, Alexandra Cohen
- Occupation: Politician

Frederick Ellyer (Freddie) Cohen (1957 – 12 May 2021) was a Jersey businessman and politician. He served as a senator in the States Assembly from 2005 to 2011, holding office as Minister for Planning and Environment and Assistant Chief Minister.

== Early life and career ==
Born in Manchester, England, Cohen was educated in Jersey at Moorestown, St. Michael's Preparatory School, Victoria College and then studied accountancy at London South Bank University.

Following a career in construction, he became trustee and Vice-Chairman of the Jersey Heritage Trust.

He is a former president of the Jersey Jewish Congregation, retiring in 2001. He has been prominent in community relations as trustee of the Jersey Community Relations Trust and member of the Jersey Holocaust Memorial Day Committee. He is also the author of two books on the Occupation of the Channel Islands and the history of Channel Island Silver, managed the new official history of the Occupation by Paul Sanders, organised the La Hougue Bie Slaveworker Memorial, and commissioned, fundraised and managed The Ultimate Sacrifice – the chronicle of Islanders who perished in concentration camps.

Prior to his election to the States Assembly, Cohen held elected office in the municipality of the parish of St John; serving as constable's officer, centenier and rates assessor.

== Political career ==
Cohen entered the States of Jersey as a Senator in 2005, receiving 13,704 votes. He topped the poll in six parishes and was third in the remaining six parishes.

He held two ministerial posts. From 2005 to 2011 he was Minister for Planning and Environment. During this term he introduced the Eco-Active environmental awareness campaign, introduced Percentage for Art, established the Renewable Energy Commission, established the Jersey Architecture Commission and achieved approval for the New Island Plan and the North of Town Masterplan. In June 2011, after the approval by the States of Jersey of his Island Plan by a majority of 38 to 1 votes and the St Helier Masterplan by 37 votes to 1, he relinquished the post to concentrate on his new UK and International responsibilities.

In 2011, he was appointed as Assistant Chief Minister with responsibility for UK and International Relations (in effect, Jersey's Foreign Minister). In this role he has led visits to India, China, Israel, and Malta. His responsibilities include developing relations with parliamentarians at Westminster. In this role he successfully negotiated UK and EU support for Jersey's Zero-Ten tax regime.

In 2011, Cohen received anti-Semitic threats and announced that he would not be seeking re-election. He later decided that he would stand in the October 2011 general election. In the election for four Senatorial vacancies, Cohen finished sixth out of 13 candidates, receiving 7,922 votes. During the campaign, media coverage focused in part on criticism of a controversial development of 45 apartments and houses at the former Portelet Holiday Village. Ironically, in November 2011 the Portelet development received the 'Best apartment development in the British Isles' gold award presented at Grosvenor House.
