= Ivy Forster =

Jèrrais politician

Deputy for Saint Helier
- In office 1948–1954

Personal details
- Born: 1907
- Died: June 1997 (aged 89–90)

Ivy Forster (1907 – June 1997) was a politician from Jersey. During World War II she and her family sheltered Russian forced labourers brought to the islands by the Nazis, activity that resulted in her sister being killed in a concentration camp. After the war, Forster was elected to the States Assembly in 1948, becoming its first female member.

== Biography ==
Forster was born in 1907, one of nine children of the seaman Vincent Le Druillenec.

== World War II ==
During World War II and the German occupation of the Channel Islands, both Forster and her sister Louisa Gould sheltered Russian forced labourers. Forster and her husband Arthur took in Grigori Koslov in December 1942, with Koslov living in their attic. In 1944 a letter written by a local resident informing the Germans about Louisa sheltering another Russian, Fyodor Buriy, was intercepted. Although Buriy was moved to Ivy's house, the Geheime Feldpolizei found evidence of his stay at Louisa's home. Forster and her brother Harold Le Druillenec were also searched, and illegal radios were found.

Louisa was arrested on 25 May and Ivy a week later, by which time Buriy had moved on. Their brother Harold was later arrested as he had been seen visiting Louisa. All three were convicted; Louisa and Harold were initially jailed in France, before being sent to concentration camps; Louisa died in Ravensbrück concentration camp, while Harold was a survivor of Bergen-Belsen and testified at the Nuremberg Trials.

Ivy was spared deportation due to being given an exemption on health grounds after a doctor falsified medical records to claim that she was suffering from tuberculosis. She instead served her prison sentence of five months and fifteen days in Jersey. Koslov and Buriy both survived the war.

The events were later made into a film, Another Mother's Son, released in 2017. Forster was portrayed by Amanda Abbington.

== Politics ==
In 1948 Forster contested elections to the States Assembly in the Saint Helier constituency and became the first woman elected to the island's legislature.

Forster was re-elected in 1951 but lost her seat in 1954.

== Death and legacy ==
Forster died in June 1997, aged 90. After her death she was named as one of the 29 British Heroes of the Holocaust.
