= Channel Islands Occupation Society =

Military history organisation

CIOS
- Founded: 1961 Jersey branch 1971
- Headquarters: Jersey and Guernsey,
- Website: Jersey Branch,Guernsey Branch

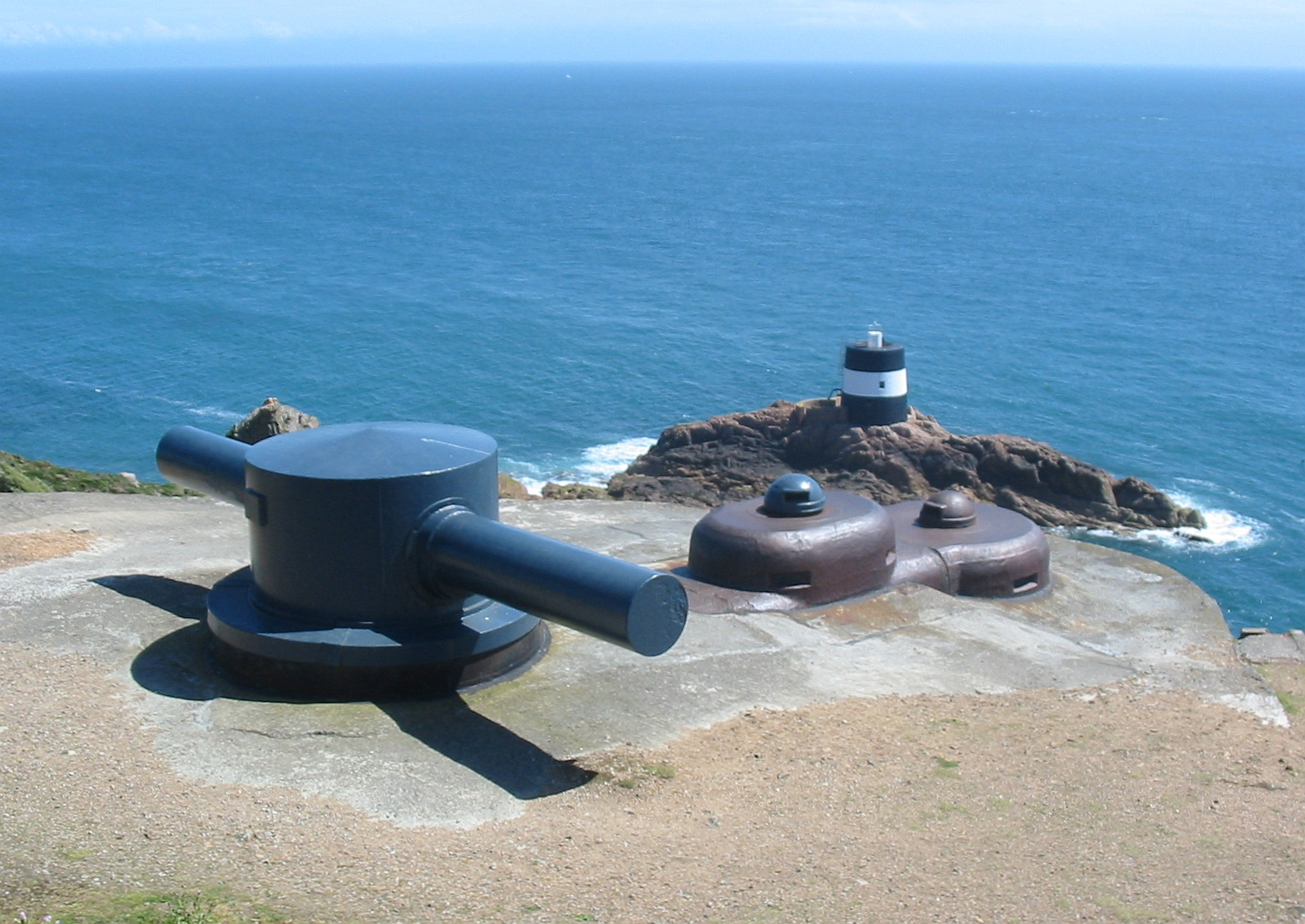
This Command Bunker forms part of Battery Lothringen, a site managed by the CIOS (Jersey Branch)

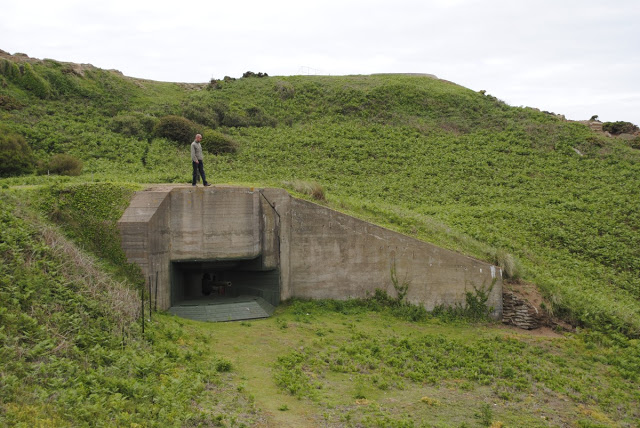
10.5cm Casemate at Corbiere managed by the CIOS Jersey

The Channel Islands Occupation Society (CIOS) is a voluntary organisation that seeks to study all aspects of the German occupation of the Channel Islands and to raise awareness and educate the public about the occupation during the Second World War. There are two branches, one in Jersey and the other in Guernsey, that take turns in publishing the Channel Islands Occupation Review. The CIOS manages many German fortifications and archives on both islands.

== Jersey branch ==
The Jersey branch was set up in 1971. In 2010 it was converted into a limited liability company.

Sites open to the public:

- Battery Lothringen, (underground command bunker, coastal artillery observation tower)
- Battery Moltke
- Strongpoint Corbière, (‘M19’ fortress mortar bunker with linked MG bunker, 10.5cm K331 (f) coastal defence gun casemate)
- Sechsschartenturm, St. Ouen
- Anti-tank gun casemate at Millbrook, St. Lawrence

== Guernsey Branch ==
Founded in 1961, by Richard Heaume, M.B.E., in Guernsey, the society still researches all aspects of the German Occupation of the Channel Islands. It has an archive of historical documents, and also renovated the former German naval Signals H.Q, which was responsible for all messages to the islands from France and then Germany after D Day. The Guernsey branch is a member of the Association of Guernsey Charities, and donates money every year to The British Red Cross, in recognition of the help given to islands by the International Red Cross in 1944 and 1945, with supplies of food to the local population.

Guernsey CIOS works with Festung Guernsey and private owners as regards sites open to the public in Guernsey:

- Fort Hommet Casemate
- St Jacques Naval Headquarters
- MP3 Tower, Pleinmont
- German Underground Hospital, St. Andrews
- La Vallette Tunnels

== Publications ==
In addition to the annual publication Channel Islands Occupation Review which has been produced since 1973, the society has published a sequence of books under the title Archive Book dealing with specific subjects such as Archive Book 5 Channel Islands Merchant Shipping 1940 - 1945

== Photos of managed fortifications ==
CIOS Jersey

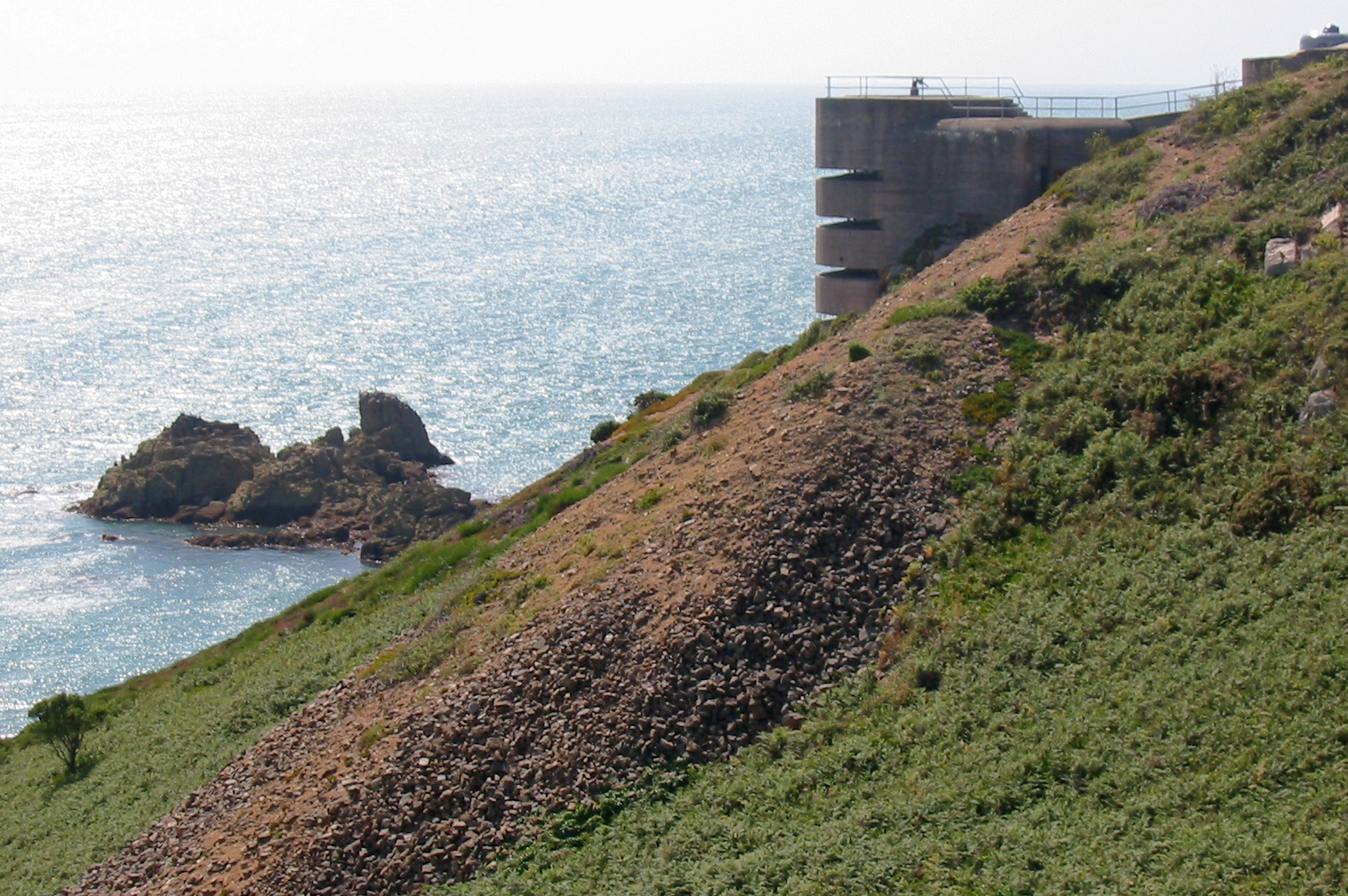
Battery Lothringen

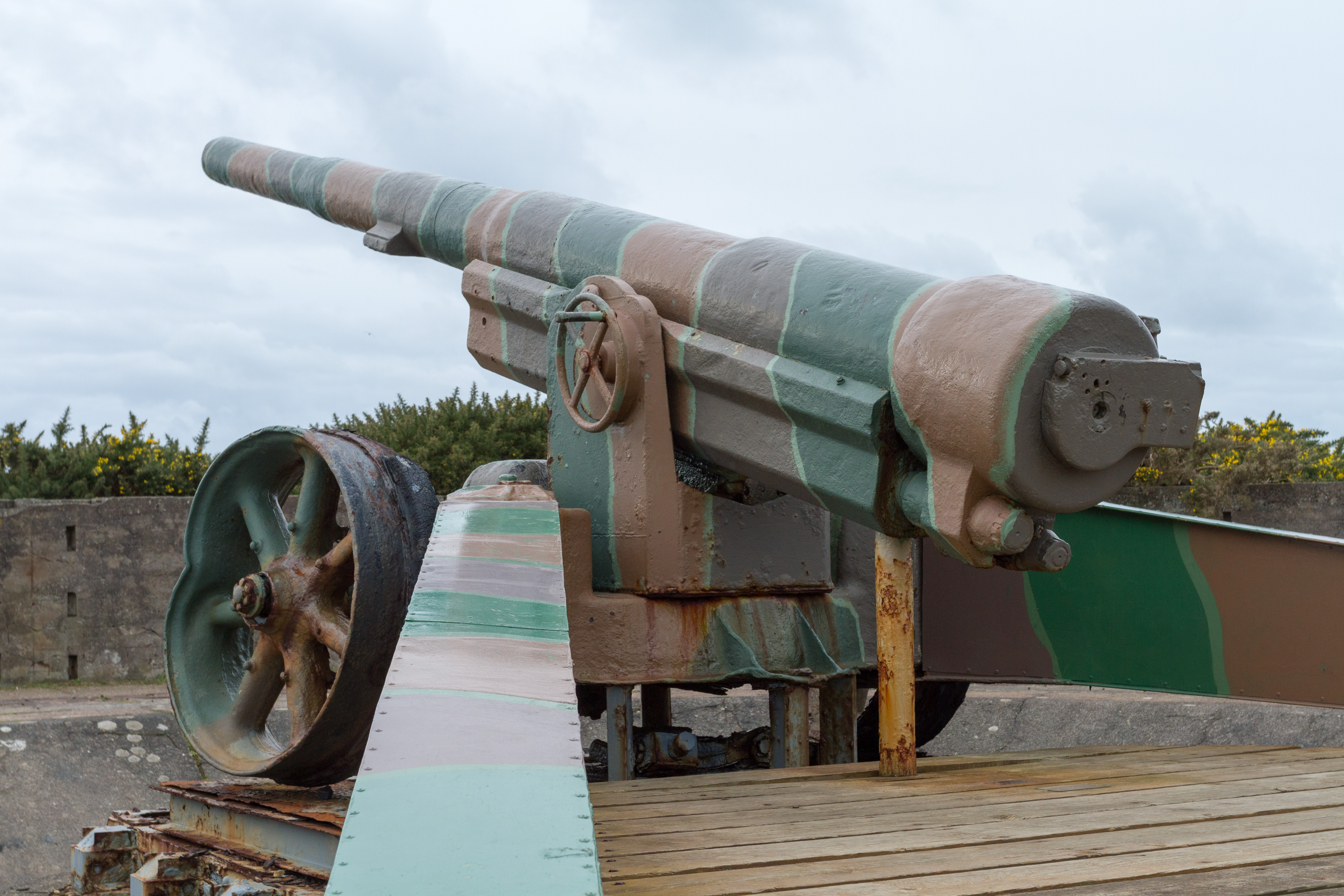
Battery Moltke

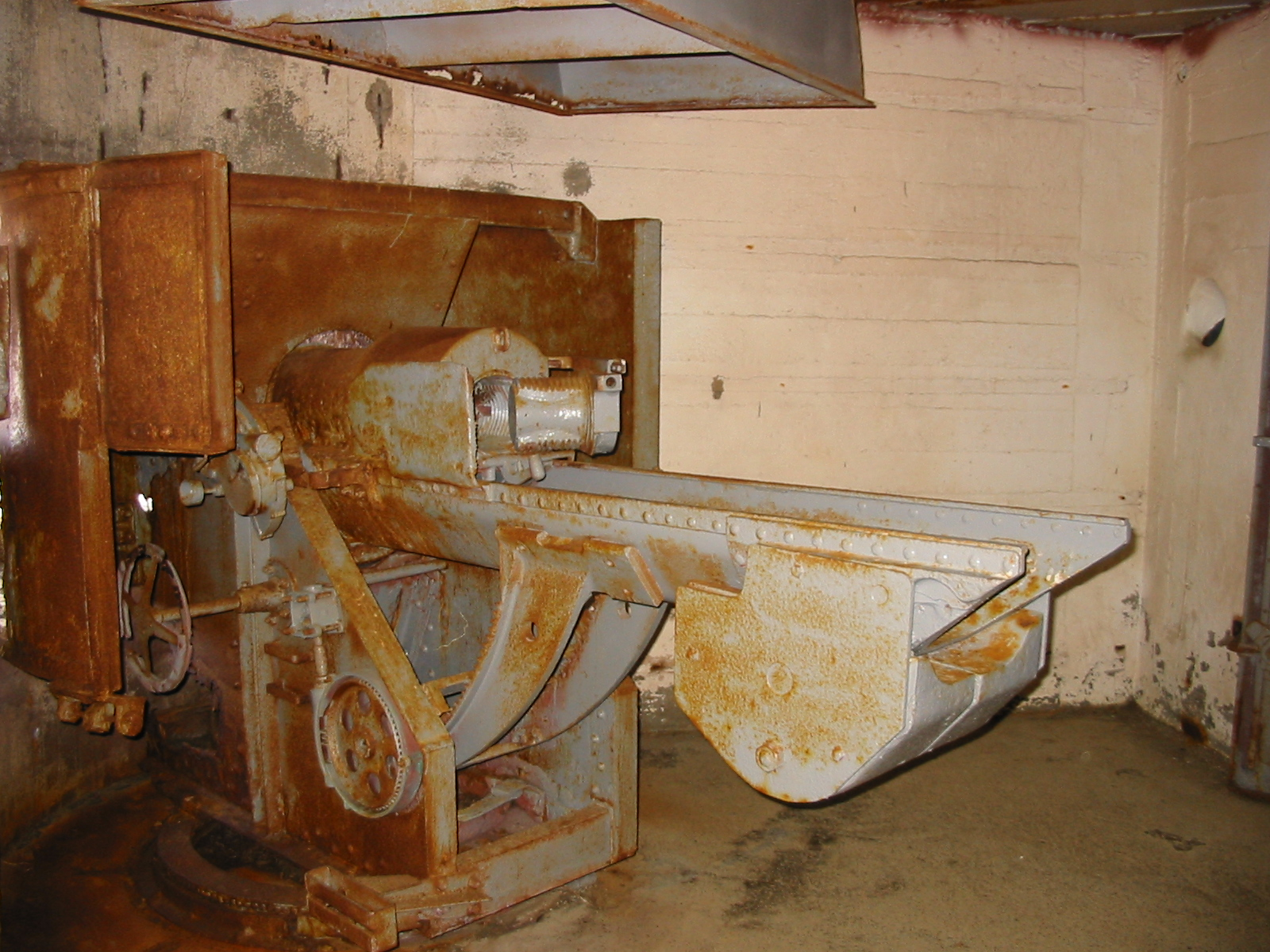
A 10.5 cm coastal defence gun.

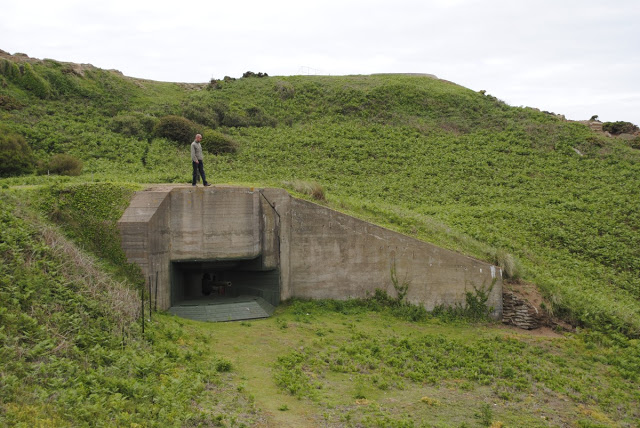
10.5 cm Casemate at Strongpoint Corbiere

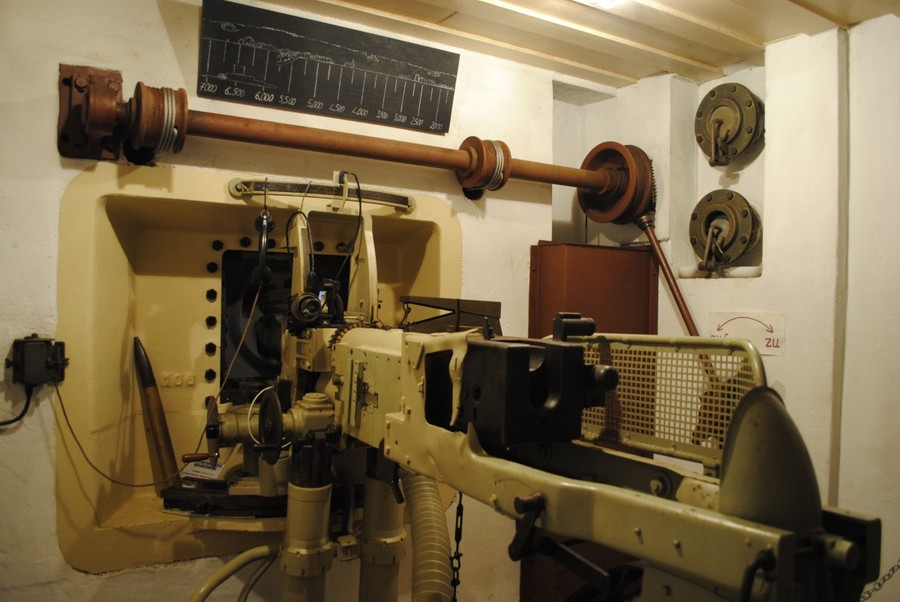
4.7 cm Pak Casemate at Millbrook

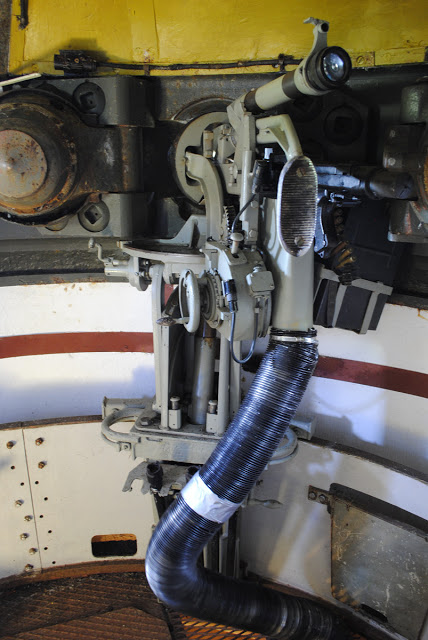
Sechsschartentürme interior

CIOS Guernsey

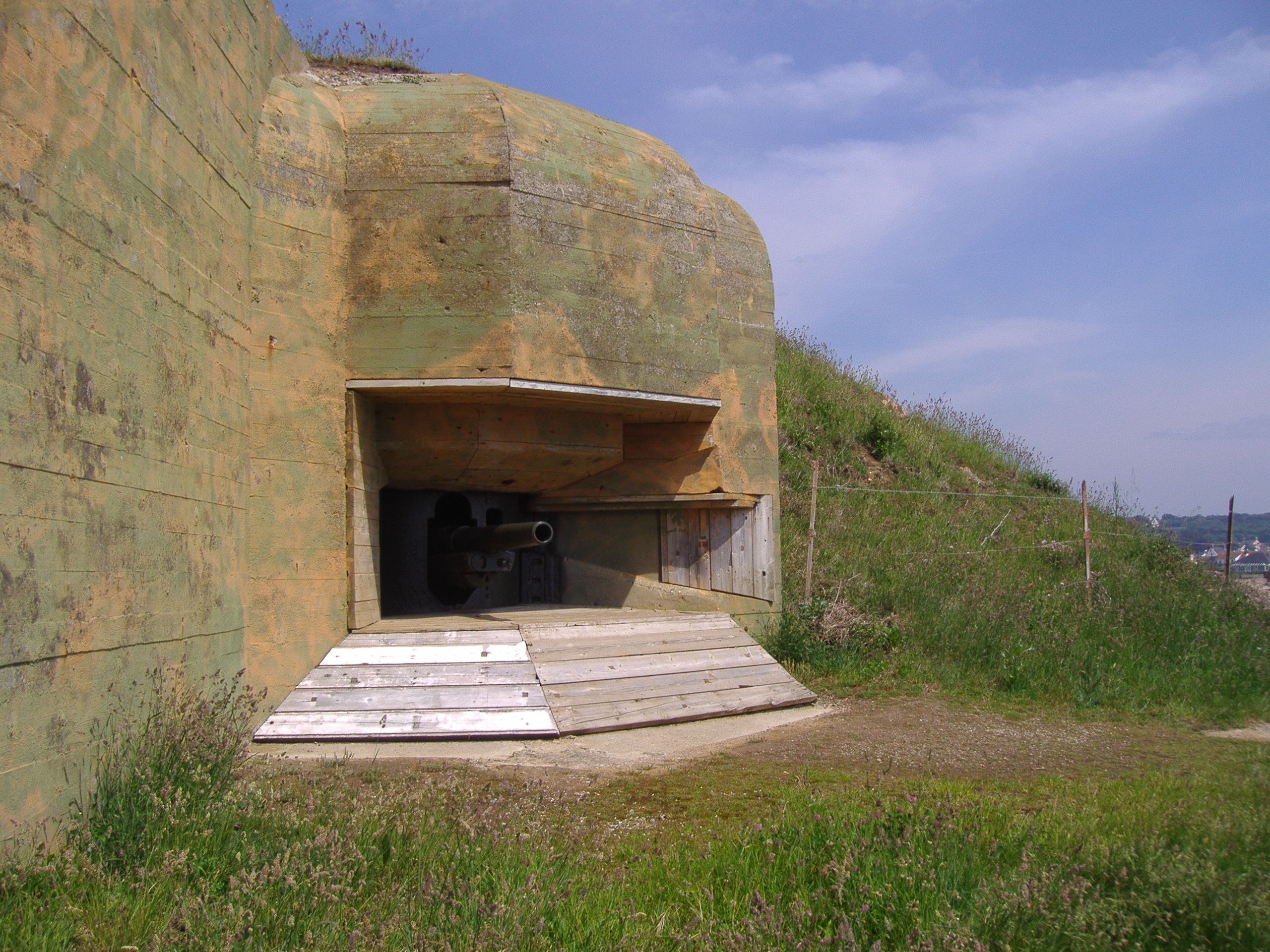
10.5 casemate at Fort Hommet

== See also ==
- German occupation of the Channel Islands
- Evacuation of civilians from the Channel Islands in 1940
- Civilian life under the German occupation of the Channel Islands
- Living with the enemy in the German-occupied Channel Islands
- Deportations from the German-occupied Channel Islands
- Resistance in the German-occupied Channel Islands
- German fortification of Guernsey
- Liberation of the German-occupied Channel Islands
