= German fortification of Guernsey =

Aspect of the German occupation of Guernsey

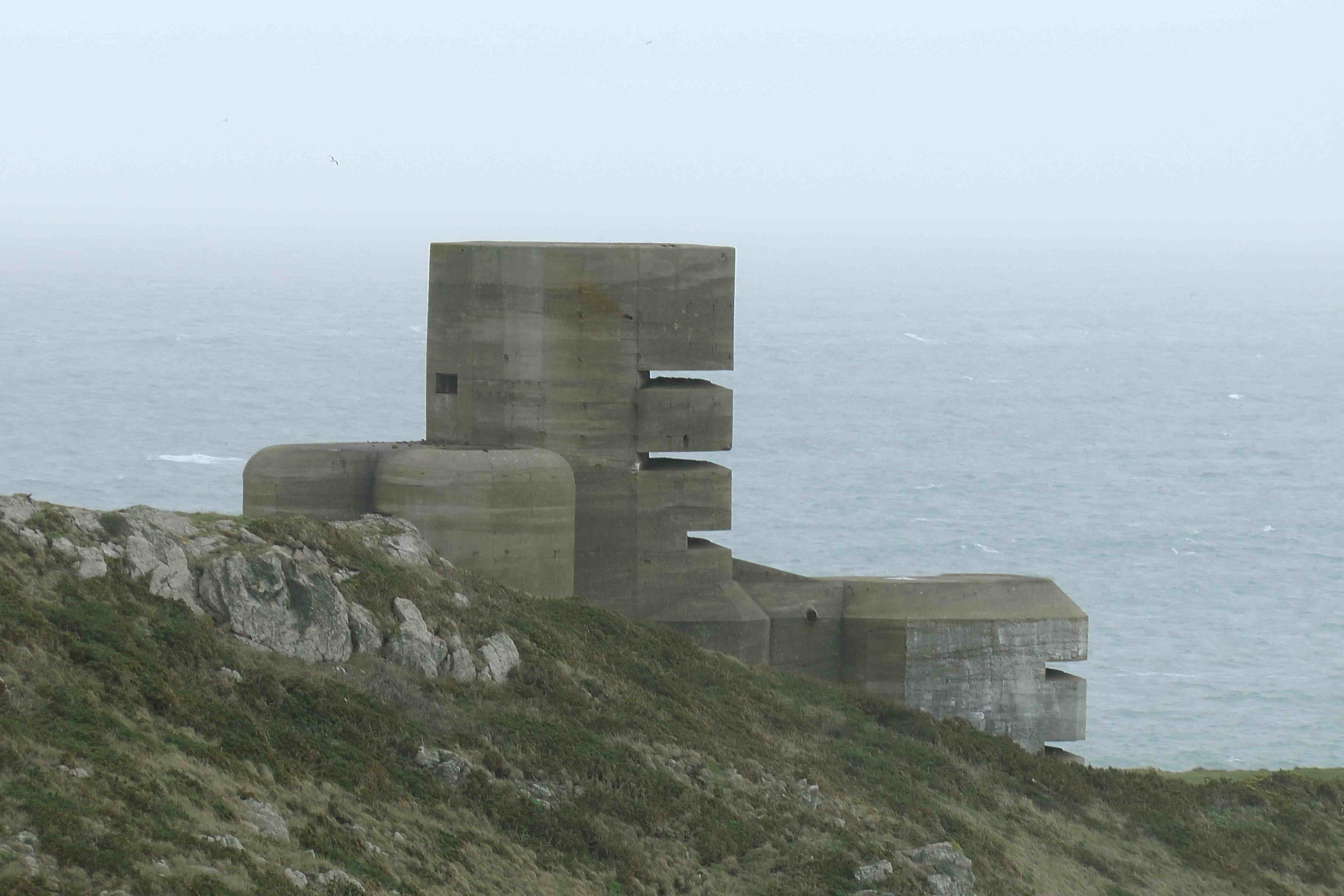
Observation post Marine Peilstand 4 (2015)

After the Wehrmacht occupied the Channel Islands on 30 June 1940, they assessed the existing defences to determine if they would be of use. The Germans found the Islands' fortifications antiquated and woefully inadequate for modern warfare.

Because the Germans expected to invade the United Kingdom in the autumn of 1940, they decided that expenditure on defences for the islands would be a waste. Initially the Germans built only feldmässige Anlage (field-type construction) positions. By 1941 the prospect of conquering Britain had decreased and the probability of an eastern war increased, requiring defences to be built to reduce the number and quality of troops required to defend the western ocean areas. Whilst the Luftwaffe and Kriegsmarine had their roles in protecting the islands from the Allies, the occupying forces put their main effort into land defences aimed at repelling a seaborne or airborne assault.

The resulting construction work in the Channel Islands was extensive; it required thousands of workers and massive supplies of cement and steel. Tiny Guernsey received special treatment. It had the largest artillery pieces in the Channel Islands, tanks, and 12,000 troops: one soldier for every two civilians on the island, compared to France which had a 1:80 ratio, or higher.

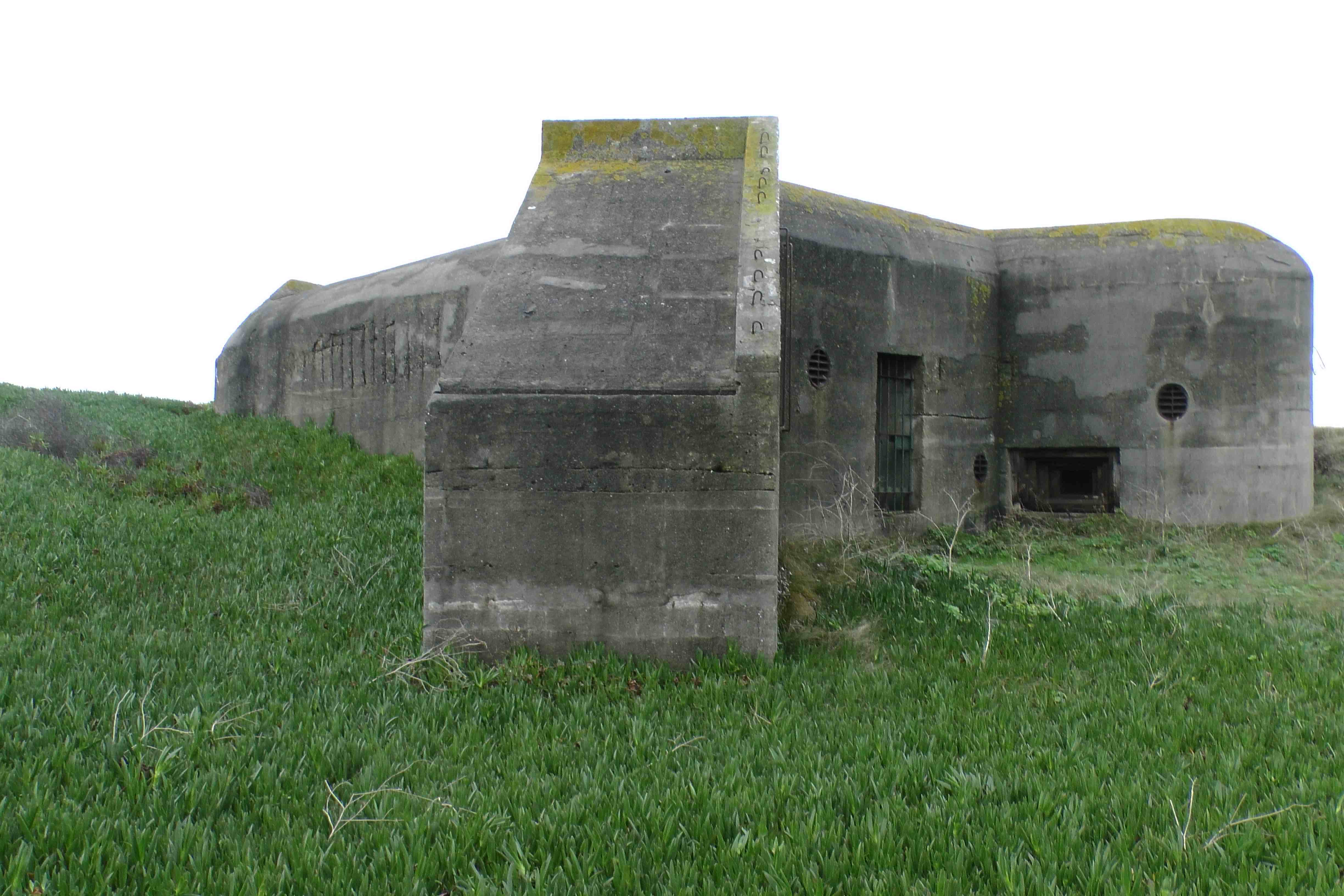
Widerstandsnest Grüne Düne Armoured Turret Bunker, which housed 4 Machine Guns inside a steel turret overlooking L'Eree Bay.

== Fortify the Channel Islands ==
On 2 June 1941 Adolf Hitler asked for maps of the Channel Islands; these were provided the next day. By 13 June Hitler had made a decision. He ordered additional men to the Islands and, having decided the defences were inadequate, lacking tanks and coastal artillery, he instructed the Organisation Todt (OT) to undertake the building of 200-250 strongpoints in each of the larger islands. OT, formed in 1933, was a construction organization that organised and supervised the work of a number of engineering and construction companies, as well as supplying a large labour force.

The "Westbefestigungen" (Inspector of Western Fortresses) was given responsibility for oversight and was required to generate bi-weekly progress reports.

On 16 June 1941 Hitler's instructions to reinforce the islands were transmitted there from Oberbefehlshaber West; the rationale was that an Allied attack "must be reckoned with" in Summer 1941.

German engineers had in 1938 and 1939 improved the Westwall or Siegfried Line (the defensive line facing the French Maginot Line), using 500,000 OT workers. They therefore had a high level of skills and quickly worked out the details of what was needed.

== Construction ==
=== Regelbau ===
The Regelbau (standard build) system used books of plans for each of over 600 approved types of bunker and casemate, each having a specific purpose. The designs had been updated as captured enemy fortifications were examined; some were even tested to destruction for effectiveness. The German designs incorporated certain standard features such as entrance door at right angles, armoured air intake, 30mm steel doors, ventilation, telephones, internal walls lined with wood, and an emergency exit. There were over 200 standardised armour parts. Each area in the Islands was examined and priorities for construction set.

Wehrmacht defence works fell into three categories:

- Feldmässige Anlage (Field-type constructions) Timber and soil with 40 cm concrete ceiling if cement was available.
- Verstärkt feldmässig or "Vf" (Reinforced field-type constructions) 1m reinforced concrete ceiling.
- Ständige Anlage or "St" (Permanent constructions) minimum 2m ceiling and walls.

Festungspionierstab 19 (Fortress Engineer Staff 19) arrived in Guernsey in July 1941, to make plans for the construction works. A visit by Dr Todt, who was also Minister of Armaments, took place in early October.

Work would be split in accordance with Dr Todt's construction orders for the Channel Island works.

- Individual troops – field fortifications, slit trenches etc.
- Divisional engineers – mines and flamethrowers
- Army Construction Battalions – reinforced constructions to provide protection of “Vf” Reinforced field-type constructions quality
- Fortress Engineers and Fortress Construction Battalions – mounting heavy weapons, some tunnelling, reporting, maps, supervising
- OT – most tunnelling, quarrying, railways, roads, loading and unloading ships, supervising civilian construction firms, controlling civilian labour and “St” fortress type constructions.

The plan was finalised and submitted to Hitler. The original defence order was reinforced with a second order, dated 20 October 1941, following a Fuhrer conference on 18 October to discuss the engineers' assessment of requirements. The outcome was a decision to provide for the “permanent fortification” of the Islands to make an impregnable fortress to be completed within 14 months. Festungspionierkommandeur XIV was created to command the project of fortifying the Channel Islands. The OT organisation designated the Channel Islands work area as Insel Einsatze.

The work would continue as planned, despite the death of Dr Todt in a plane crash in February 1942. Albert Speer replaced Todt.

=== Construction workers ===
Fortress Engineer specialist sub-units such as Compressor, Mining, Rock Drilling, etc., would move between the Islands as required. OT would carry out the majority of the work.

Supervisors and OT labour was supplied to German construction companies, ten of which operated in the Channel Islands. Skilled labour was recruited as volunteers from countries that had been overrun by German troops, including the Netherlands, Belgium, and France to top up the thousands of German workers. These employees were paid and provided with accommodation, better food, time off, leave and comforts. German OT wore OT uniforms; civilians from other nations wore civilian clothes. OT gave Guernsey the code name Gustav.

The manual labour would be provided using Gastarbeitnehmer (guest workers), Militärinternierte (military internees), Zivilarbeiter (civilian workers), Ostarbeiter (Eastern workers), and Hilfswillige ("volunteer") POW workers. Volunteer and conscripted labour would receive much better treatment than would forced labour. The forced labour came from the millions of prisoners taken during Operation Barbarossa, and arrived in the Islands in late 1942. Other sources of labor were Poland, French camps full of Spanish Republicans who had fled Spain after losing the civil war, and 1,018 out-of-work French North Africans from Algeria who were living in the south of France.

It was not just men that became OT workers; a number of women also found themselves in work camps. Some of the workers were Jews; around 1,000 French Jews spent time in the Channel Islands. The lowest levels of manual labourers were treated like slaves. They were badly fed and clothed and were beaten and punished for minor offences; the Germans considered them expendable and worked some to death. Conditions in Alderney were the worst where for a period the SS ran some Alderney camps. Some of the OT supervisors were sadistic. Ninety-six known graves of these workers are in Guernsey and 397 in Alderney. Detailed death certificates were filled out and the deaths were reported to OT in St Malo.

Forced workers from overseas only had the clothes they were wearing when taken, often summer clothes. They were supposed to be paid 55 Reichspfennig an hour. If they were from the Eastern Bloc, a deduction of 55% was made to pay for the cost of overseas reconstruction. They worked 12-hour shifts, seven days a week, and were allowed one half-day a month off.

Local workers too were recruited. The OT pay scale would provide them with 60% more than the normal local wages, but a team of eight plasterers negotiated a pay rise so they were each paid £12 a week if they managed to plaster 35m² per 10-hour shift. This compares to the £2-10-0 a week offered by the States of Guernsey.

=== Preparations ===
Fortress Engineers, Festung Pionier Stab XIX, established their HQ at Elizabeth College and stores were set up next to Vale Castle and Bulwer Avenue for timber, stanchions, camouflage paint, anti tank obstacles, steel doors, tank turrets, etc. Shops for joiners and locksmiths were set up.

Headquarters of the 7,000 strong OT in Guernsey was established at Sausmarez park in December 1941. The OT hospital was at Ruette Braye, its fuel depot at Grandes Rocques, and timber and cement stores at St Sampson.

Sourcing of materials and transport had to be organised. Barges and small ships were brought to the Islands to transport materials to supplement the two ships run by OT. The supply vessels needed escort and flak ships for protection.

Cranes and concrete mixers were sourced. A 90 cm gauge railway was constructed, running from the harbour in St Peter Port north to St Sampson and on to L'Ancresse, before running down the whole of the west coast to L’Eree.

Consumable materials were sourced: cement, steel, timber for shuttering, sand and aggregate. Guernsey had a major quarrying industry so had stone and crushing facilities available. Tunnelling also generated stone. The Island had sand pits, away from the coastline that had had the salt washed out. Beach sand and pebbles would be used as a last resort.

OT transport was brought to Guernsey, mainly French vehicles dating back to 1914, to supplement horse-drawn transport. Contractors brought equipment and vehicles. Five camps were built, however most OT workers went into requisitioned houses.

== Fortifications ==
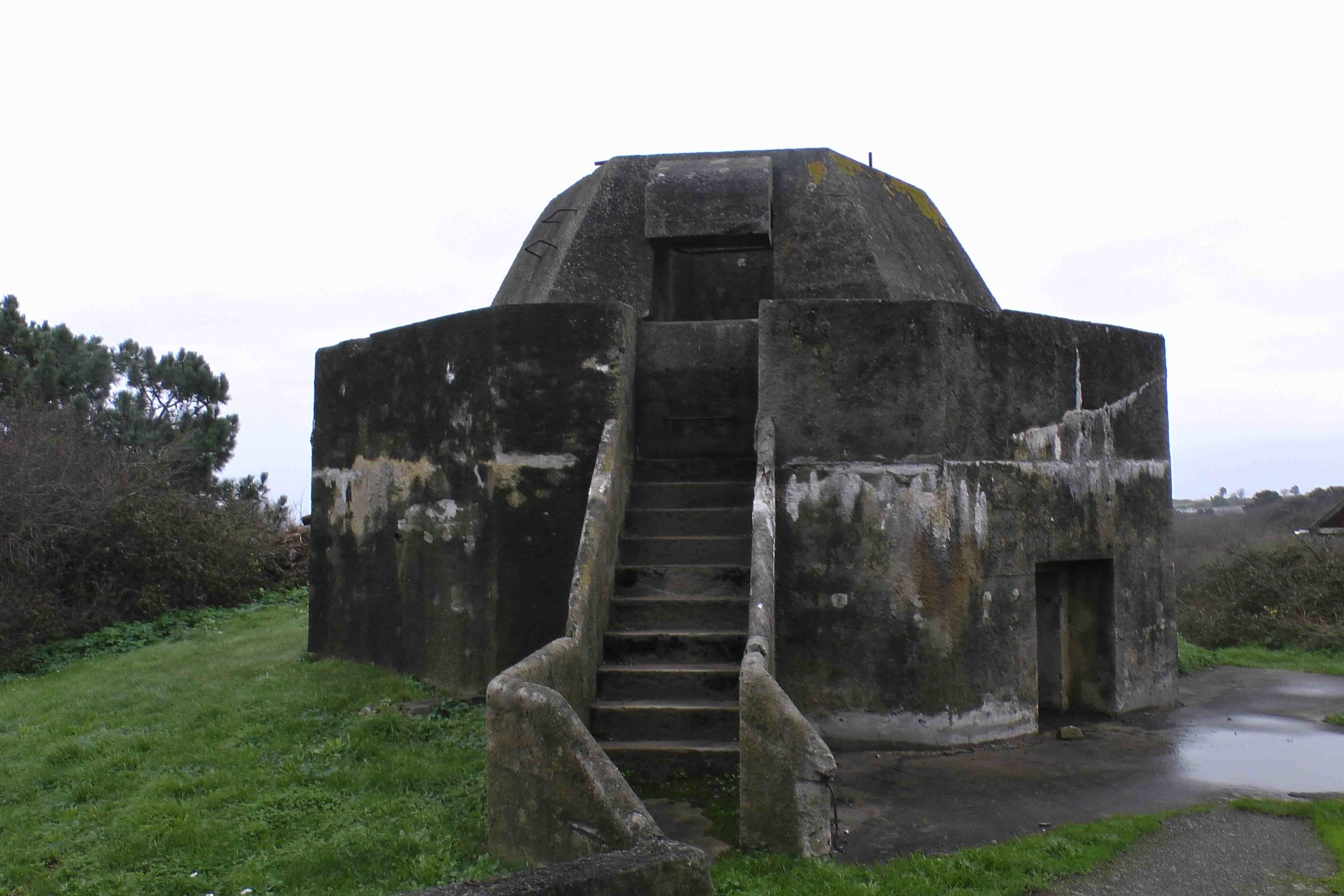
Originally a 2cm anti aircraft position, the base was modified to take a radar antenna for use by Mirus Battery

From October 1941 and especially throughout 1942, building works moved ahead rapidly in hundreds of sites.

Using the Regelbau standardized plans, each site was excavated normally using manual labour, sometimes needing explosives, the materials excavated generally being kept close by. Metal strengthening bars were wired together and the wooden shuttering was installed. It was necessary to pour the concrete in as continuous operation as possible to avoid joints that would weaken the structure. Holes through walls for ventilation pipes and cables, doorways and escape routes being put in before the concrete was poured. Massive prop supports were needed for the 2–3.5 metre thick ceilings.

Each location had defences and facilities to suit its specific needs, the thickness of walls, floor, and ceiling were standard. A few plans were modified to suit the local terrain. Fittings such as air purification systems, showers, gas proof doors, telephones, periscopes, and wiring were standardised. Some elements were stripped from the Westwall and Maginot Line, others manufactured specifically.

=== Artillery positions ===
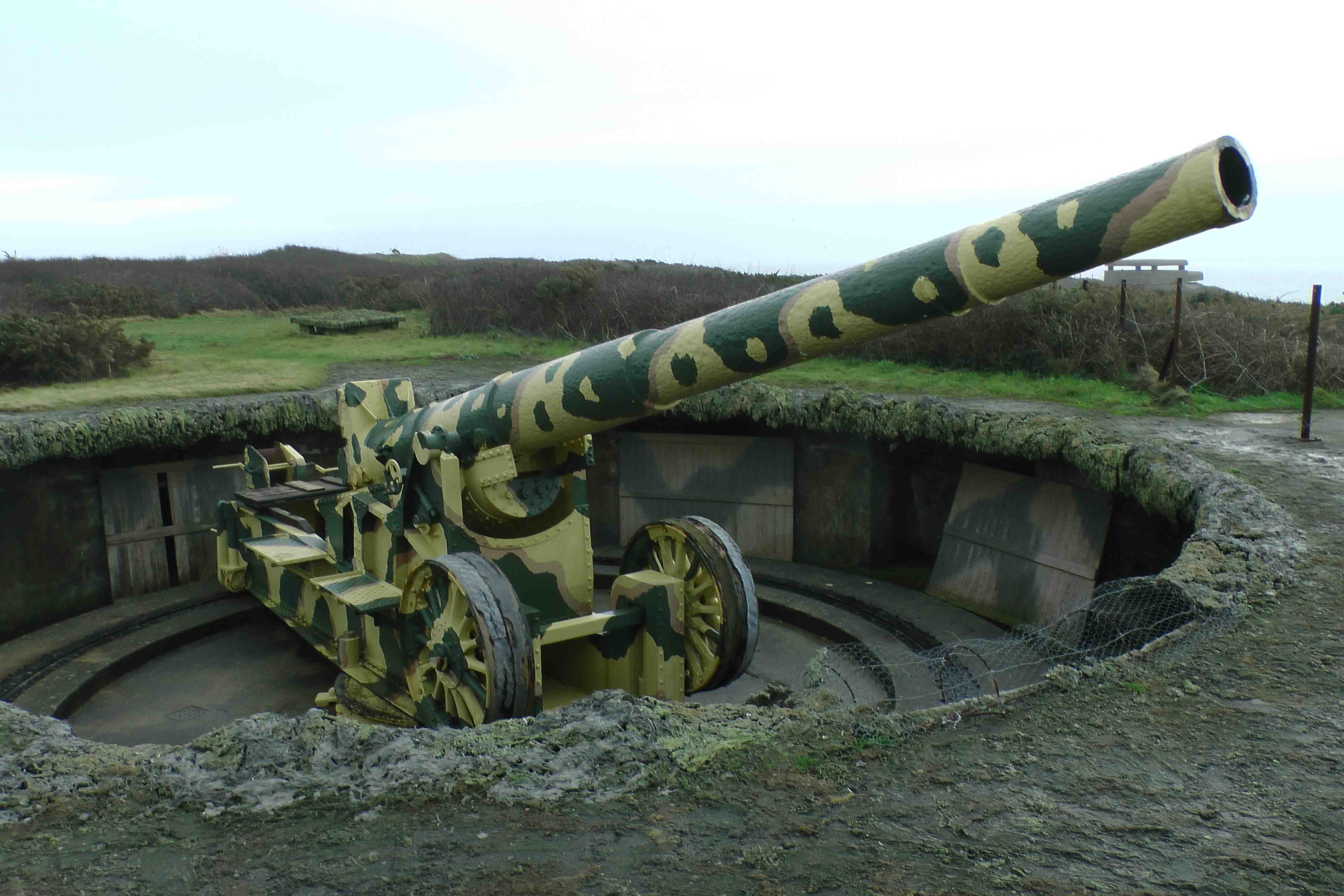
22cm K532(f), Battery Dollmann

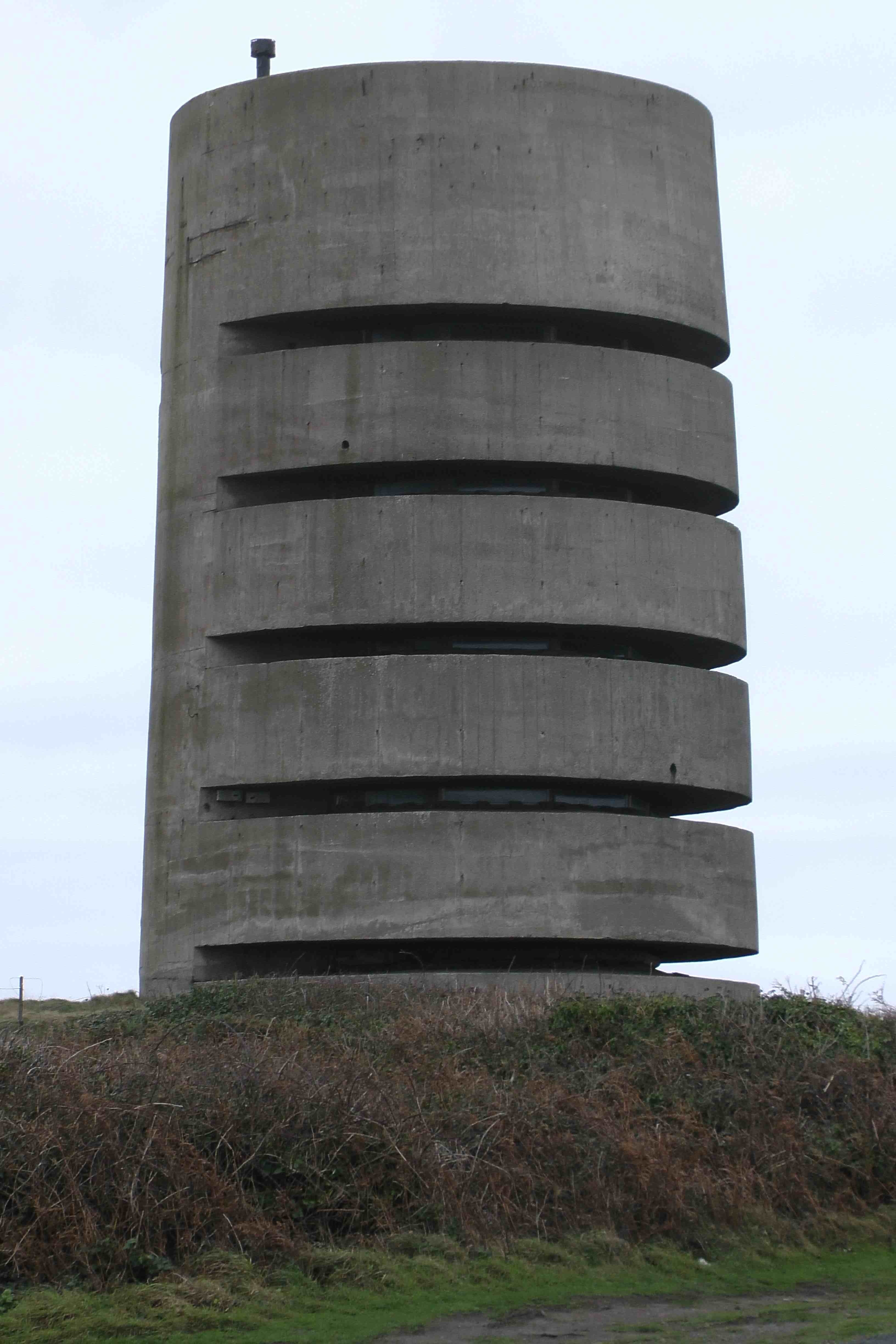
MP 3 Pleinmont

Batterie Mirus was the largest artillery battery in the Channel Islands. Using four barrels taken from a 1917 Imperial Russian dreadnought captured in Norway and resting on platforms manufactured by Friedrich Krupp A.G., these 30.5 cm guns had a potential range of 51 kilometres (32 mi) with lightweight high explosive shells, weighing 250 kg or 31 kilometres (19 mi) with the heavier 405 kg armour piercing shells. The battery became operational in June 1942.

Ten other coastal artillery batteries, which included 1 x 15 cm SK C/28 and 1 x French 22 cm K532(f) at Jerbourg Point, run by Marine units, 3 x 21 cm Mörser 18 and 3 x French 22 cm K532(f) army units, all designed primarily to fire out to sea, were placed in open concrete pits so that they could turn 360 degrees. Bunkers for ammunition stores were constructed as were accommodation bunkers.

Battery Dollmann at Pleinmont is open to the public to visit; it has one of the four 22 cm gun pits and a number of trenches restored. It features accommodation bunkers and two fortress quality ammunition bunkers, all linked by deep, concrete-lined trenches. A command and an observation bunker completes the major fortifications. Its guns had a range of 23 kilometres (14 mi). Barbed wire, 2 cm Flak positions, a Tobruk pit, 150 cm searchlight, minefields, Pak40 anti tank gun, and a Freya radar supported the battery.

Land artillery was situated to fire on landing beaches and inland. Artillery Regiment 319 was strengthened. In Guernsey there were five batteries, each of four 10cm Czech artillery, which had a range of 9.6 kilometres (6.0 mi). Two of the batteries were in casemates; three were in reinforced in field positions of earth and timber construction.

Six Marinepeilstände (MP) observation towers were built on high points. They are the most obvious symbol of German construction. Each observation slit of a tower observed for one particular battery and was fitted with range finding equipment. Naval Range-finding Tower MP 3 at Pleinmont, which has 5 observation levels and had a radar unit on the roof, has become a museum, open to the public.

The initial plan was for two towers to observe a target and through measuring angles determine its distance and therefore grid reference. However, when multiple targets were visible, it was almost impossible to know which ship each tower was observing. The system was dropped before all the planned towers were built in favour of stereoscopic rangefinders, making several of the already constructed towers redundant.

=== Anti aircraft defences ===
Mainly manned by Luftwaffe men of Flak Regiment 292, the multi purpose 8.8 cm Flak 36 were the main defence with a 7,500m effective range, located in six Island batteries and controlled by radar direction finding equipment, backed up by 150 cm searchlights. Two batteries were to Fortress-quality positions; the remaining four were in field emplacements. L’Ancresse common has, in the middle of the golf course, the six gun Flak Battery Dolman, in concrete emplacements that could be used for a dual purpose as they commanded sea approaches with a 14,000m effective range. The crew room and ammunition store was below each open gun placement. The battery had its own Würzburg Dora radar position and command bunker.

3.7 cm Flak and 5 cm Flak provided medium support (3,000-5,000m effective range) and 2 cm Flak were located for close protection of facilities, some in concrete emplacements (2,000m effective range). In total there were around 175 dedicated anti-aircraft guns in the island, plus machine guns on anti-aircraft mountings.

Anti-airborne landing obstacles were installed, many with explosives attached.

=== Beach and headland defences ===
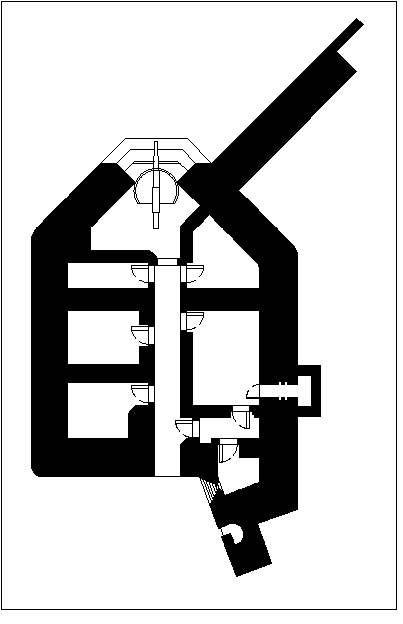
10.5cm Casemate - type "Jäger"

Most beach defences were designed to fire across the beach, the embrasures being protected from enemy fire from the open sea. This allowed interlocking and self-supporting fire.

Twenty one of the casemates built into the coast were designed for 10.5 cm K 331(f) French guns that had been acquired in large quantities. An additional 13 being mounted in open field positions. A casemate with a 10.5 cm gun has been restored at Hommet headland, north of Vazon and is open to the public.

Sixteen anti tank gun casemates holding the Czech 4.7cm Pak with co-axial machine gun in a casemate, such as a Type R631. Seventeen additional 4.7 cm Pak 36(t) were emplaced in field positions.

Machine guns protected within casemates, on top in Tobruk pits, or in trench systems, some with thin overhead protection. At Fort Saumarez L’Eree headland, a trench system with machine gun and a Tobruk pit has been opened up and is accessible to the public.

60 cm searchlights for illuminating the sea, normally protected in small concrete shelters when not in use.

Anti landing craft objects of steel and wood, thousands of tetrahedra and Czech hedgehog, often with teller mines attached on the beaches.

Anti tank walls built at the high water mark. Most of L'Ancresse bay is protected by a wall.

=== Defensive areas ===
Defensive areas were built to protect facilities or an area.

The concept of lineal defences having been discredited in World War 1, the current idea was hedgehog defences with all round visibility and support from other positions giving interlocking fire.

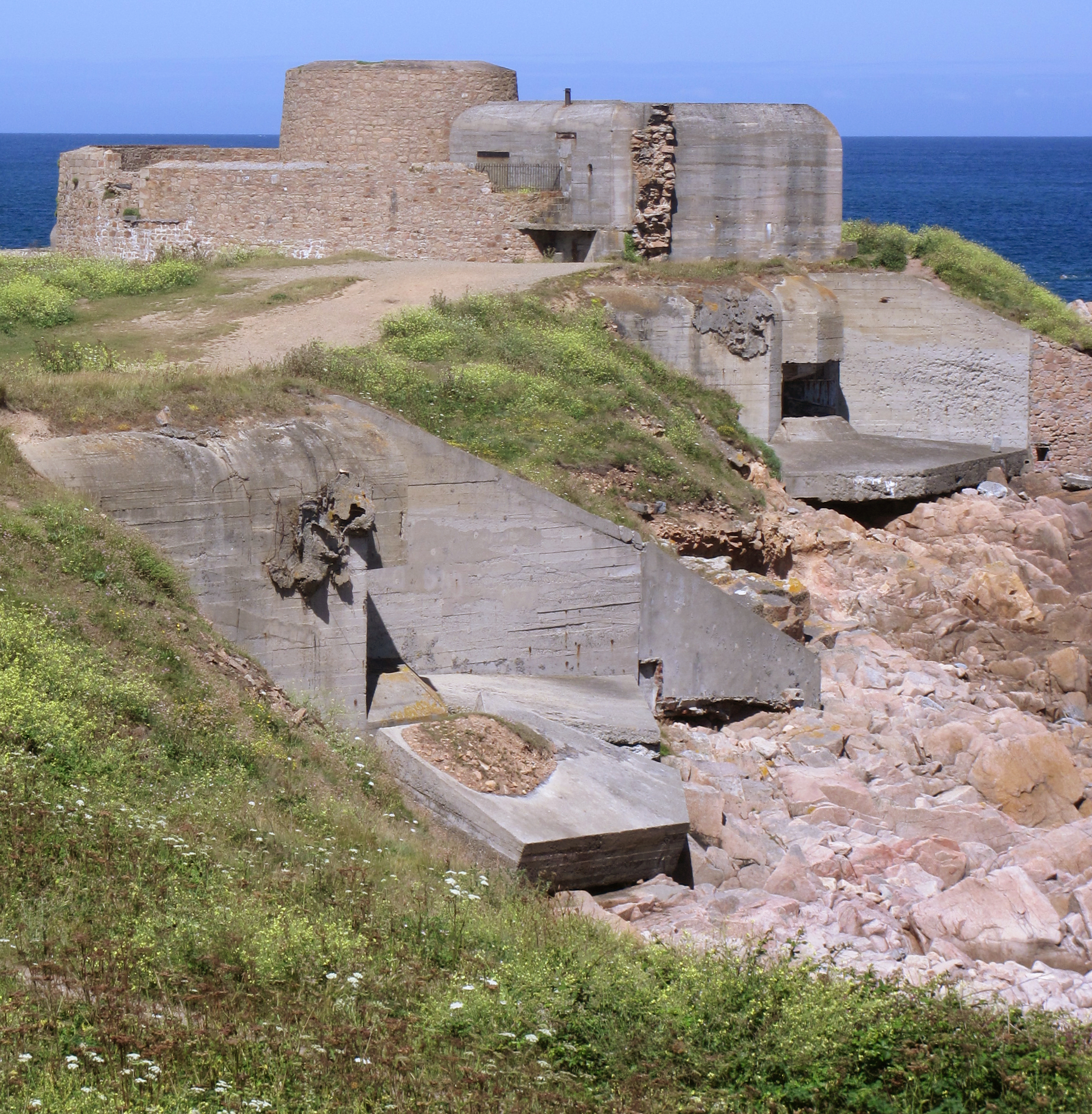
Stützpunkt Rotenstein, Fort Hommet

There were twelve Stützpunkt (Strongpoint) (SP) areas in Guernsey, such as Stützpunkt Rotenstein at Fort Hommet which comprised: 4x10.5 cm casemates, 2x 60 cm searchlights, an MG bunker, a 4.7 cm anti tank casemate, a tobruk pit mounted with a French tank turret, a type R633 bunker containing a M19 automatic mortar, and two other bunkers for personnel and storage as well as barbed wire, minefields, flamethrowers and trenches. A type R633 bunker took 845m³ of concrete and 40 tons of steel to build.

Widerstandsnest (Resistance nest) (WN) formed a smaller defensive zone, filling in between SPs, and protecting specific points, like artillery batteries or a radar station. With several concrete constructions, they were adapted to the circumstances, such as WN Grune Dune, which is at Rocquaine Bay, comprising two anti-tank gun casemates, a multi loophole steel turret bunker mounting several machine guns, a personnel bunker with a periscope, anti tank wall, observation position and small command bunker. Barbed wire and minefields would have protected the nest.

Historic defence works, considered by the engineers to be of high quality construction and well placed were given concrete additions, Castle Cornet, Vale Castle, Fort Hommet and Bréhon Tower amongst them and would become SPs or WNs.

Personnel shelters, such as a Type R621 shelter designed for a section of 10 men, had two concealed exits and a ringstellung or Tobruk pit were used in many locations, as were 5 cm and 8 cm mortars. Areas overlooked by cliffs had 1,000 roll bombs, 300 lb French shells, suspended on wires that could by cut, resulting in the bomb falling and when a second wire was pulled, detonating, normally at the base of the cliff. Anti glider poles were installed on potential landing sites.

A Stützpunktgruppe (Strongpoint group) was a cluster of SPs and WNs under command of a Battalion. Several Strongpoint groups made a Verteidigungsbereich (Defence area)

=== Tunnels ===
Hohlgangsanlagen (cave passage installations) (Ho) were built to store vehicles, ammunition, food, fuel and equipment. Ho. 40 was equipped and used for a short while in 1944 as a hospital, as the planned hospital tunnel had not been built, however patients underground did not recuperate very well.

The largest tunnel complex, two connected tunnel systems, Ho. 7/40, comprised 7,000 square metres (75,000 sq ft). 29,823 cubic metres (1,053,200 cu ft) of rock were removed and 9,053 cubic metres (319,700 cu ft) of concrete was poured. They took 2 years to construct.

Sixteen tunnels were planned in 1942, and this was increased to twenty nine in 1943. Fourteen tunnels were started, but few were completely finished. Some were half built, others were abandoned early when poor rock quality was hit, or priorities changed. In Guernsey a total of 92,995 cubic metres (3,284,100 cu ft) of rock was excavated and 22,009 cubic metres (777,200 cu ft) of concrete were poured.

The tunnelling system adopted comprised, drilling a series of holes, several metres deep, inserting charges and detonating them, this created a hole 2–3 metres (6 ft 7 in – 9 ft 10 in) high and the same width. Once the fumes and dust had dispersed, the loose rock could be cleared, loaded onto wagons run out on 60 centimetres (24 in) tracks and removed. Water had to be drained, the new floor leveled, and the track extended. If necessary, timber supports were installed, then the process started again. Once the small tunnel was complete, it could be expanded, the width to 6–7 metres (20–23 ft) and height to 4–7 metres (13–23 ft), this was the most dangerous job as rock falls were frequent.

Shuttering for concrete walls and if the ceiling was to be done, overhead supports were installed and concrete poured. Cavities filled with rubble. There was a lack of waterproofing and subsequent rock falls into cavities could damage the tunnel. Tunnelling could be continued 24 hours a day with two 12 hours shifts as lighting in the tunnel could not be seen outside at night.

=== Specialist facilities ===
Radio communication bunkers were built. The Naval Signals HQ at St Jacques in St Peter Port was the main communications centre. It comprised three bunkers: types V142, M172 and V192. The Channel Islands Occupation Society has refitted V142 as a museum.

Netzknotenpunkt (Telephone network bunkers) were built to protect vulnerable exchanges. Four are located in Guernsey. A power station was built in the Bouet by OT. HQ and command bunkers were built for the Fortress Commander at La Corbinerie west of Ville au Roi, connected to one for the 319 Divisional commander. The Heer (army) having two Regimental HQ bunkers, 583 Infanterie Regiment in Rue du Candie, St Andrews and 584 Infanterie Regiment at Beau Sejour. All of these were two stories, some were disguised as houses, with tiled roofs and painted windows. Artillerie Abteilung 1265 HQ was at Quatre Vents Estate, St Martin. These bunkers were used in addition to the use of hotels and large houses that made more amenable surroundings for the officers.

Würzburg radar units, priority targets for the Allies, were disguised where possible. The smaller Freya radar was less visible. However both would suffer damage from bombing and bombardment so the crews worked from inside bunkers. The two Würzburg and two Freya radar units at Fort George, Guernsey, were repeatedly attacked from the end of May 1944 on.

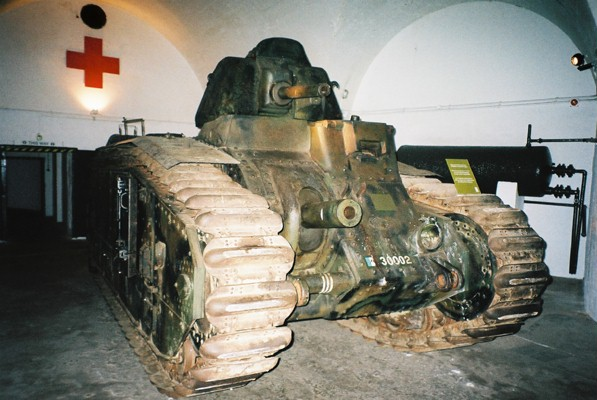
Renault Char B1

Anti-tank artillery was in short supply. Guernsey received a few tracked anti-tank guns, but relied more on guns such as the 3.7 cm Pak 35/36, fifteen 5 cm Pak 38, and eight 7.5 cm Pak 40.

A small number of the obsolescent French Renault FT tanks were shipped in 1941 to the island. French Renault Char B1 tanks, destined for Rommel in North Africa in early 1942, also were diverted to the Channel Islands. Guernsey received two command tanks, 12 normal tanks, and five flame-throwing tanks.

U-boat and S-Boat facilities amounted to fuel tanks installed in Ho. 4 tunnels at La Valette in St Peter Port, to hold 480 tons of fuel. However, U-Boats in Guernsey were too vulnerable to air attack. Ho. 4 is now an occupation museum.

Luftwaffe fighter groups JG27 and JG53, equipped with Me Bf 109s, had been based during Kanalkampf in Guernsey in 1940. Activity decreased following the conclusion of the Battle of Britain, with the airfield being used more for refuelling and inter-island communications rather than as a base for permanent aircraft.

Other buildings used as headquarters included the Crown Hotel, which served as the Harbourmaster's office.

=== Camouflage ===
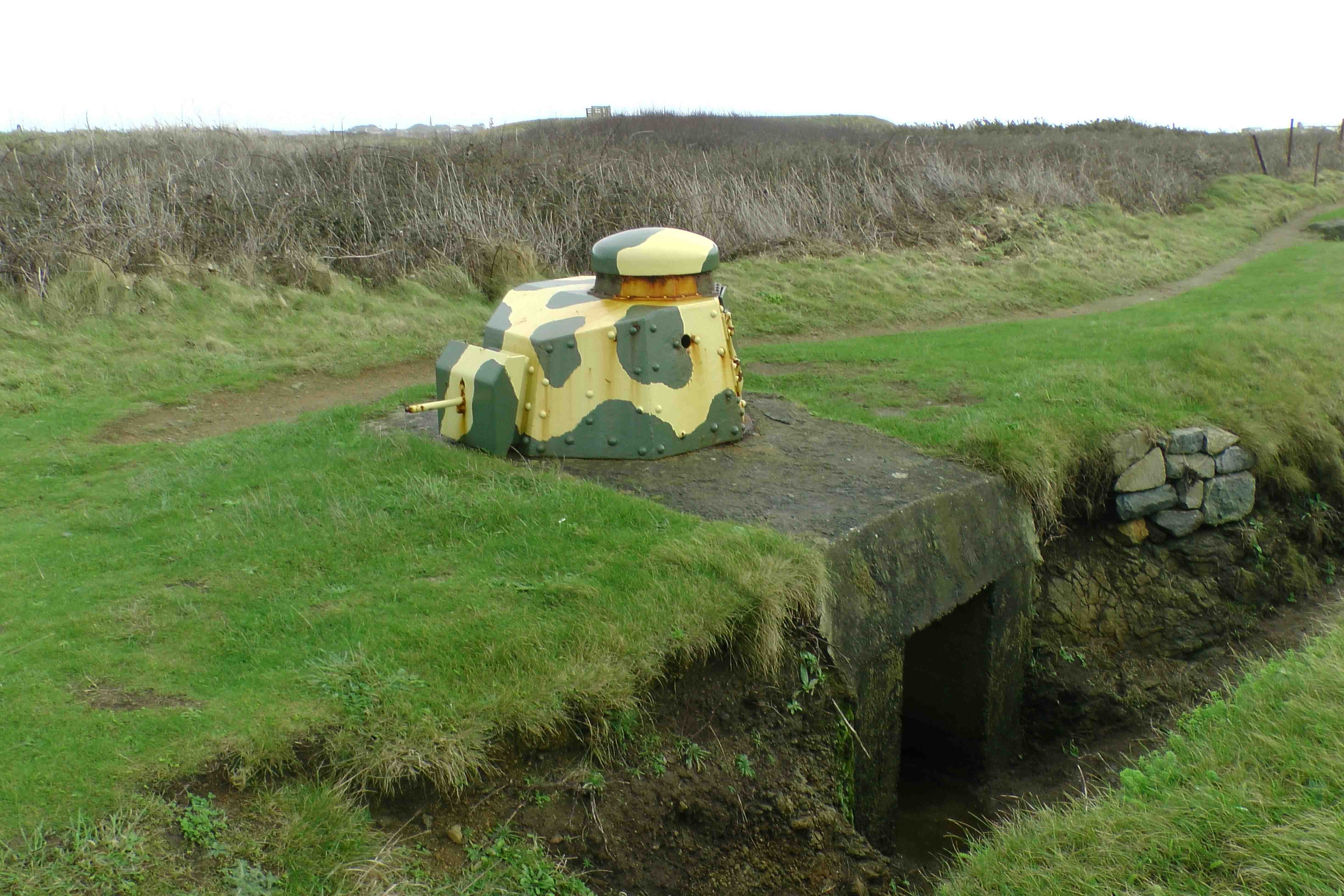
FT-17 turret, Battery Dollmann, Guernsey

Some positions were buried under soil and landscaped with plants and trees. Camouflage in the form of paint, sprayed concrete and straw on wire mesh, and timber constructions were common. Granite stones were built into some concrete walls to give a natural stone finish.

Dummy positions were set up, including using logs to simulate guns and dummy minefields. More exotic camouflage, including disguising positions as houses were used. One example was a Mirus gun position; another was a 10.5 cm casemate at Houmet.

The Allies knew the locations of casemates as the RAF had undertaken photographic flights during the construction years. In addition, a few messages giving some detailed information, had been smuggled out of the Islands.

=== Roads ===
To eliminate traffic accidents, everyone had to drive and cycle on the right. Furthermore, to avoid confusion over road names, the Germans introduced a colour and number code. Roads going northwest to southeast were yellow; those going northeast to southwest were red. Also, each route was given a number. Many roadside walls received painted arrows and numbers in red or yellow to indicate directions. Lastly, the Germans produced a map, suitably marked, for their soldiers.

The route from St Peter Port to St Saviour was modified to accommodate the towing of the Batterie Mirus gun pieces by four heavy Sd.Kfz. 8 half-tracks. A number of junctions on the route also had sentry and machine gun positions built into granite walls.

== Statistics ==
- Over 16,000 OT workers were brought to the Channel Islands, of whom 7,000 came to Guernsey. The numbers in the Islands fell in September 1943 to 9,500, and by January 1944 to 4,500. Almost all had left by June 1944.
- 244,000 m³ of rock were excavated out of the Channel Islands, only a little less than the 255,000m³ in the whole of the rest of the Atlantic Wall.
- The Festung Guernsey book recorded that 616,000 m³ of concrete had been used in Guernsey. Almost 10% of all the concrete used in the Atlantic Wall was used in the Channel Islands. The Mirus battery alone used 45,000 m³.
- One cubic metre of concrete contained 400 kg cement, 1,800 kg aggregate and sand, 170-200 litres water.
- The first mine was laid in November 1940; altogether there were 118 minefields in Guernsey. After the war, bomb-disposal engineers removed 69,301 mines between 18 May and 19 July 1945, at a cost of six killed and 12 wounded.
- From April to September 1943 shipments by sea to the Channel Islands averaged 20,000 tons per month. Thereafter they dropped to just 3,700 tons as priority shifted to the Atlantic Wall.
- Of the 96 OT workers who died in Guernsey, the majority died as a result of tunnelling accidents, a British bombing raid on St Peter Port in January 1942, and typhus in February 1943. In Alderney there were 397 graves and a ship carrying possibly 200 workers from there was sunk on 7 July 1944, the passengers drowning.
- From the beginning of 1943 further construction work became a lower priority as the by then existing defences were sufficiently strong. Fortress engineers and OT workers returned to France to work on V-1 sites and the very weak Atlantic Wall, which had lost 7,000 workers who been shipped to Germany to repair damage caused by the May 1943 Dambusters raid. New work ceased when Italy surrendered in September 1943.
- Over 300 large concrete constructions were built in the Channel Islands,
- 1,100 OT workers remained in Jersey in October 1943, of which 530 were Islanders. It is likely that similar numbers were in Guernsey.
- Guernsey recorded 112 deaths of foreign workers:

Algeria 21 - Belgium 16 - China 1 - France 41 - Germany 10 - Italy 1 - Netherlands 10 - Poland 2 - Portugal 1 - Russia 3 - Spain 6

== German troops ==
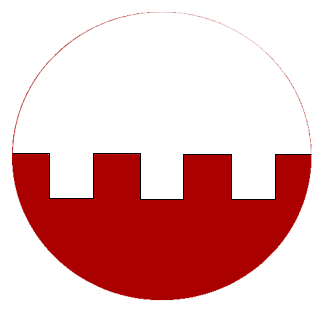
319 Infantry Division

319 Infantry Division (319 ID), which had been created in November 1940 and was designed as a static division for service in occupied Europe, was allocated to the islands. Reinforced with additional Heer units including 16th Machine Gun Battalion and 213th Panzer Battalion, and Kriegsmarine and Luftwaffe units.

This took the troops in Guernsey up to 12,000. The civilian population in Guernsey was 23,000. Guernsey had to pay for the German troops, providing them with and paying for their food, accommodation and transport.

319 ID provided the bulk of troops for the whole of the Channel Islands, it became the largest division in the German army. Only about 30% of the original 319 ID personnel were still with the unit in June 1944, the fitter men having been sent to the Eastern Front, to be replaced with less fit and non German troops. Army troops were rotated to Alderney for three month tours of duty.

In September 1944 there were 10,980 troops in Guernsey comprising:

Heer - Infantry 4,150 - Anti-tank 430 - Tank 180 - Artillery 520 - Coastal Artillery 1,130 - Engineers 90 - Signals 180 - Supply 720
Luftwaffe 1,850
Kriegsmarine 1,420
Construction 310

== Postscript ==
Commanding Officer of the German garrison, Lieutenant-General Rudolf Graf von Schmettow, nephew of Gerd von Rundstedt commander of OB West (Commander-in-Chief West), ordered the writing of a 500-page book that described the fortifications in great detail, illustrated with maps, photographs and coloured drawings. A copy was destined for Hitler. The chapters from the original book have been reproduced in a set of ten paperbacks. Festung Guernsey (fortress Guernsey).

Whether the Islands were impregnable was never tested, except for Battery Blücher in Alderney. Alderney was considered too well-protected against aircraft attack so HMS Rodney had the mission of shelling it. Rodney fired seventy-two 16-inch shells. This resulted in damage to three guns in open pits and the deaths of two men from their crews. The Germans repaired the battery within a few weeks.

The German garrison in the Channel Islands surrendered without a fight on 9 May 1945.

Many of the German works are on private land and so inaccessible to the public. Others may be looked at, clambered over, and a few can be entered with care. Tunnels are sealed or locked as they are especially dangerous. Renovated positions are open to the public and some have been refitted and opened as museums.

- MP 3 tower, Pleinmont
- Battery Dollmann, Pleinmont
- Castle Cornet Hafenschloss strongpoint, St Peter Port
- Naval Signals HQ, St Jacques
- Ho.7/40 tunnels, St Andrews
- Ho. 4 tunnels, La Valette, St Peter Port
- Mirus battery gun pit and bunker
- 10.5cm casemate, Hommet
- Fort Hommet M19 automatic mortar
- Trenches, L’Eree headland

== See also ==
- Channel Islands Occupation Society
- German occupation of the Channel Islands
- Resistance in the German-occupied Channel Islands
- Civilian life under the German occupation of the Channel Islands
- Fort Hommet 10.5 cm Coastal Defence Gun Casement Bunker
