= Sechsschartenturm, Heavy MG bunker, La Mare Mill =

WWII fortification in occupied Jersey

4-S WaKoFest, Wn La Mare Mill
- Part of Atlantic Wall
- La Mare Mill, St. Ouen's Bay, Jersey
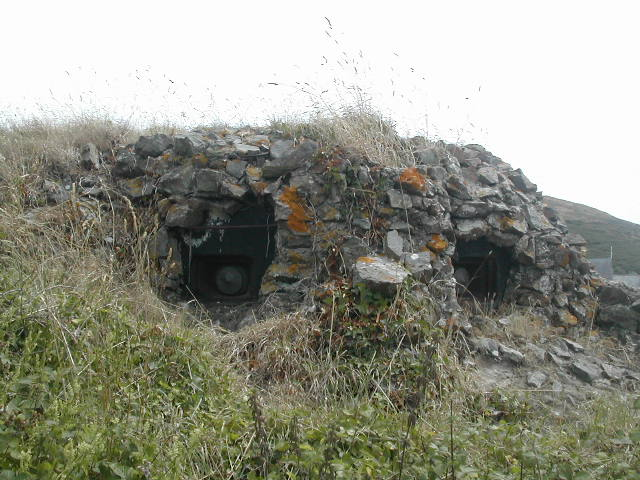
- The well camouflaged turret

- Flag of German occupying forces

Site information
- Open to the public: Yes
- Condition: Restored, retains turret

Location
- Coordinates: 49.212989°N 2.212072°W

Site history
- Built: 1941–1945
- Built by: Organisation Todt
- In use: 1941–1945
- Materials: Concrete, steel
- Events: Occupation of the Channel Islands

Garrison information
- Garrison: Heer

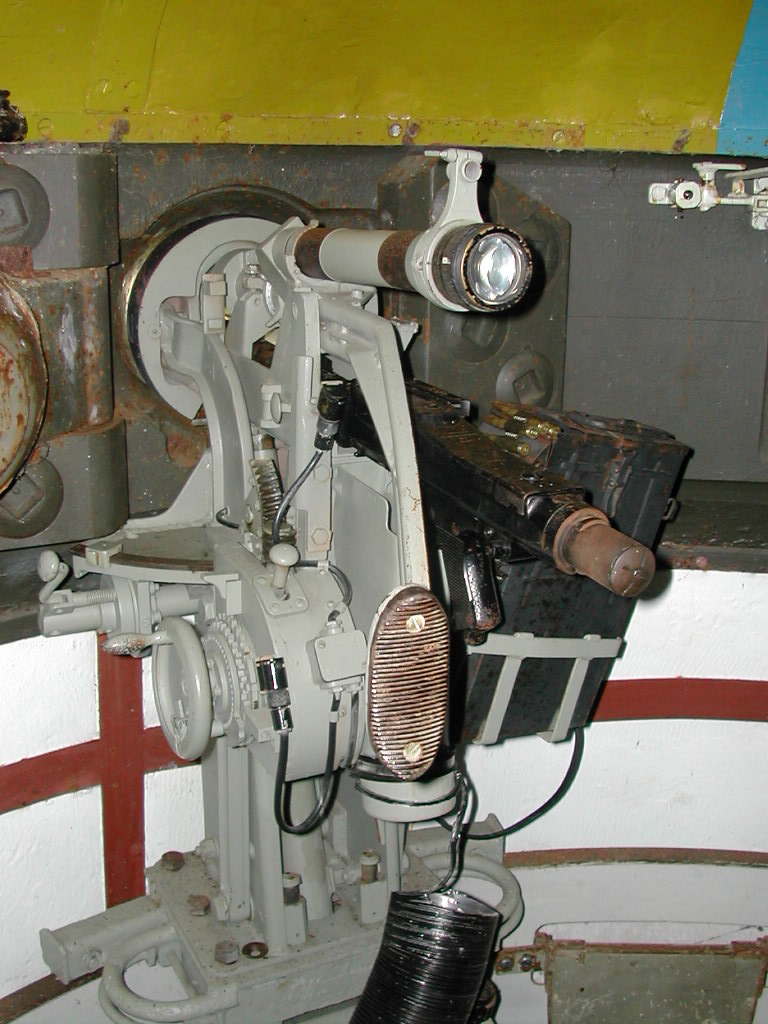
MG34 on mount, originally there would have been two in the turret

Sechsschartenturm, heavy MG bunker, La Mare Mill, or 4-S WaKoFest, Wn La Mare Mill, consists of a sechsschartenturm (English: six-loophole turret) and a personnel bunker. The Organisation Todt built it to an Atlantic Wall standard on a commanding position near the demolished La Mare Mill during the Occupation of Jersey.

Sechsschartentürme turrets were common place along the Atlantic Wall and the Germans constructed nine in Jersey, but today only this and one other example at Mont Mathieu survive. The Channel Islands Occupation Society now operates the turret and bunker as a museum.

== The turret ==
A sechsschartenturm is a non-rotating turret made of steel up to 12 inches thick, pierced by six loopholes. Each turret operated two MG34 machine guns on rotating mounts. This turret only has four loopholes; the other two were sealed as they faced the cliff and were of no military value. The interior of the turret was brightly painted into 6 sectors (one for each loophole), and each sector was also numbered. One MG34's fire would be directed via the colours while the other MG34's fire would be directed via the numbers, this was to an Atlantic Wall standard. A thick steel door, with an asbestos gas seal, would close off each loophole when it was not in use.

The MG 34s were fitted into specially designed hinged mounts for ease of use. The gunner could quickly withdraw his MG34 from one loophole and push it along a rail to another. In fact, this would have been the only time the crew of the turret would have been exposed to the outside world (albeit for a few seconds). The MG 34 mounts are equipped with telescopic sights. In addition, the turret had a periscope and a searchlight, all of which could be operated from the turret. Each MG 34 fired a 7.92mm round at a fire rate in excess of 1000 rounds per minute to a range of approximately 1500 yards. The design of the machine gun mounts permitted the gun crew easily to change the gun's barrel; the gunner would stop firing, lift the hinged scope out of position, open up the gun, slide out the barrel and insert a new one. For a well trained crew this would only take seconds. The mounting also incorporated a chute which emptied spent casings into bags below.

== The bunker ==
The bunker is an early variant of what became the Type 632 design and is found only in the Channel Islands. It features a series of rooms in a triangular mass of concrete (a similar shape to the 632). The first large room is the command room, which also served as the dormitory. The small rectangular room beyond the command room is the magazine, where the bunker's ammunition was stored. The last, circular, room held the bags of spent ammunition; the cupola sat directly above this room.

The entrance to this bunker is down a rock cut alley that would provide an attacker absolutely no cover or room to maneuver, making the entrance defence, which consisted of one MG34 or MG42 that fired through a small embrasure, quite formidable. The entrance defence was also the most exposed area. Because the defenders could not seal its loophole to the same standard as the loopholes on the turret, the fortress engineers decided to separate the entrance defence from the rest of the structure with a series of gas doors.

The bunker in operation would have been pressurized. The pressurization would keep out poison gas should the Allies use it, and ensure that when the guns fired, almost all the smoke from the burnt powder exited the bunker. When the gunners fired, the pressurized air in the bunker would push the gasses out through the guns' barrels. The reduction in smoke would allow the crew to operate effectively even when firing constantly. The pressurization also meant that the spent cases contained less residual gas, meaning they could just be fed out of the cupola via pipes into bags with no danger of smoking out the bunker's other occupants.

As with most, if not all bunkers along the Atlantic Wall, the bunker featured an escape shaft. To escape, the occupants of the bunker would first have to remove a metal door, revealing two rows of steel bars. After the crew had cleared the steel bars, they still would have to shift an area of soil and demolish a brick wall. The escape shaft was not convenient to use, but with the bunker having a good ventilation system and walls several metres of concrete thick, the chances are the shaft would never have to be used.

Another feature of the bunker is the interior decor. Like the decor of most bunkers, it is spartan, apart from the wooden cladding. The cladding provided sound damping; we do not know whether this was intended or accidental.

On top of the bunker there is a tobruk, a concrete foxhole where the defenders could station an additional MG34. Later in the war the Germans constructed a railway embankment towards the south side of the bunker, limiting its field of fire. This may have been temporary while construction work was being carried out in the area.

== Location ==
The turret sits approximately 10 metres above the road level and halfway up the headland. From there it commands the flat plain between the headland and the beaches. The turret also guards two roads leading to the interior of the island.

There were several of these bunkers lining the headland of St. Ouen's bay and overlooking the low-lying areas beneath. Their locations permitted the bunkers to achieve interlocking fields of fire. Anti-tank ditches, barbed wire, mines and excellent camouflage complemented the bunkers, creating a formidable defensive position. In order to land there, the Allied landing craft would first have had to run the gauntlet of artillery fire from the cliffs above to arrive on the beach. The troops would then have to scale an antitank wall and deal with various anti-tank emplacements and bunkers. Once past the beach, the Allied troops would have faced minefields, barbed wire, flooded areas and ditches while still under fire from the artillery, and now from the sechsschartentürme. As it was, Allied High Command decided that the invasion of Normandy would bypass the Channel Islands, so the defences were never used in anger.

== Photographs ==
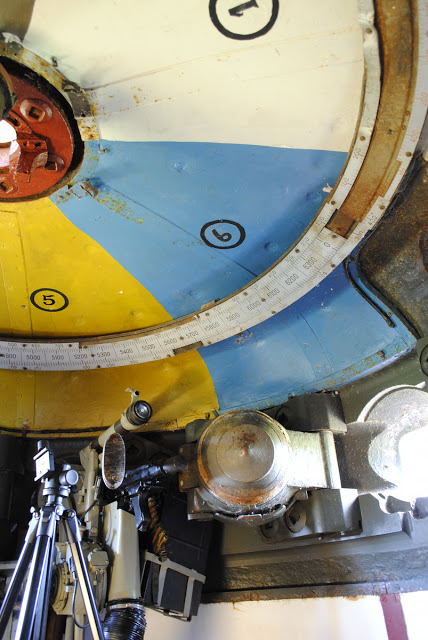
The ceiling of the turret was divided into painted and numbered sectors

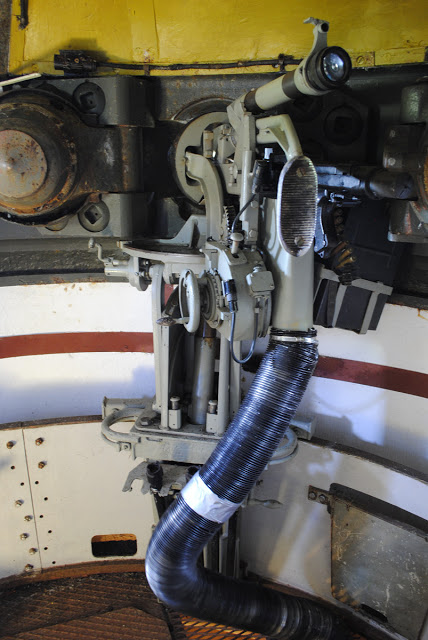
The MG34 in its mount

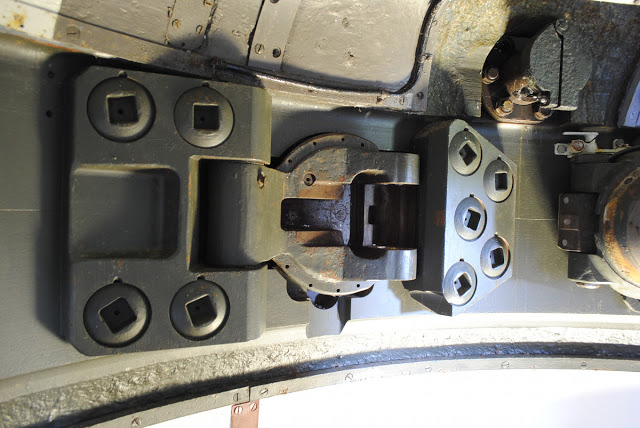
The steel gas sealed doors which closed the loopholes

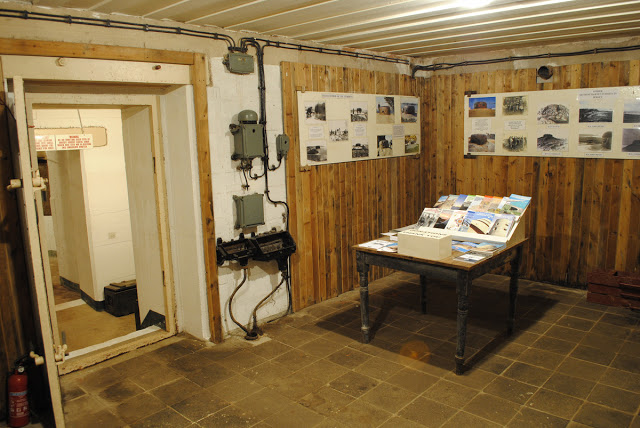
The command room

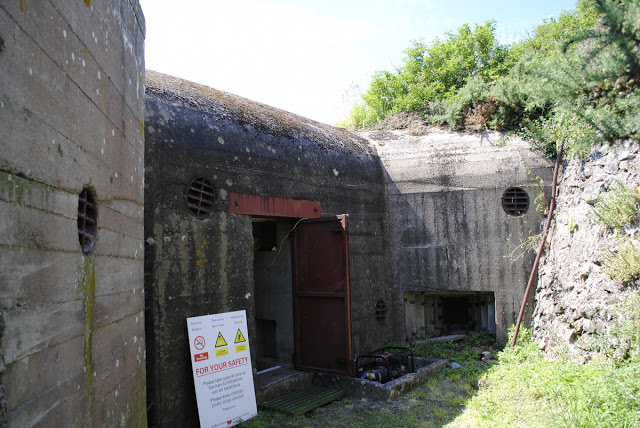
The main entrance showing the defence

== See also ==
- Coastal fortifications of Jersey
- Battery Moltke
- Battery Lothringen
