= German Naval Signals HQ =

Building in Saint Peter Port, Guernsey

- Part of the Atlantic Wall
- St. Peter Port, Guernsey

Site information
- Type: German naval signals building
- Open to the public: yes

Location
- Shown within Channel Islands
- Location within Channel Islands
- Coordinates: 49.461147°N 2.546418°W

Site history
- Battles/wars: None
- Events: German occupation of the Channel Islands

The German Naval Signals HQ is a bunker in St. Peter Port that was used by the Germans during the German occupation of the Channel Islands. It was the headquarters of all naval operations, and all of the German radio signals passed through there. The bunker was restored and currently is a museum.
