= Fort Hommet casemate =

WWII Nazi Germany bunker on Guernsey

Fort Hommet
- Albecq, Castel, Bailiwick of Guernsey
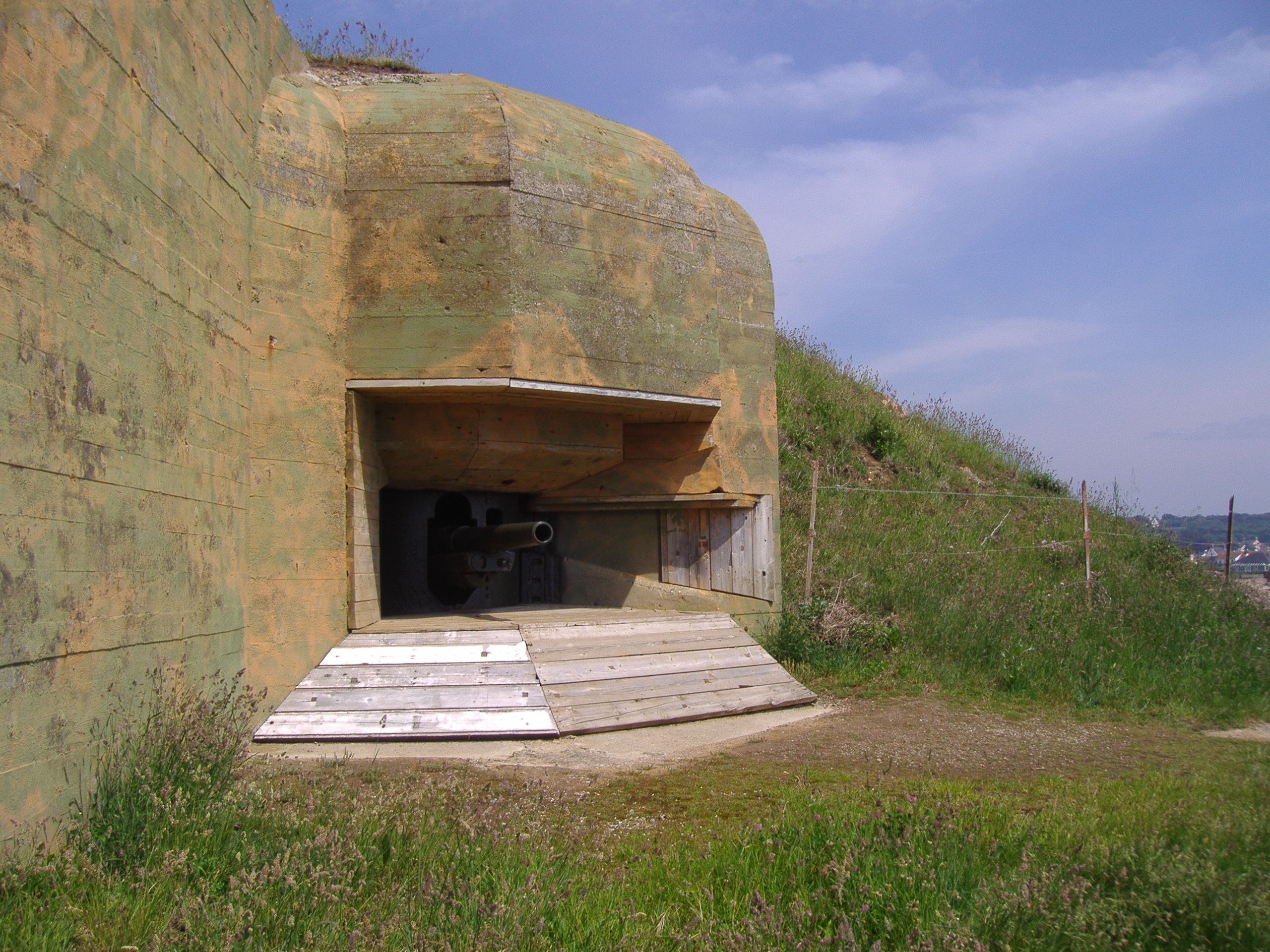
- 10.5 cm Coastal Defence Gun Casemate

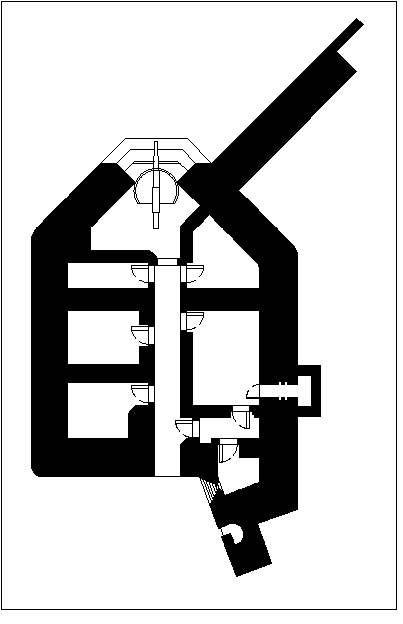
- Plan of the Casemate

Site information
- Type: Artillery Casemate
- Open to the public: Yes
- Condition: Restored in 1995

Location
- Location within Channel Islands
- Coordinates: 49.47437°N 2.61182°W

Site history
- Built: April 1943
- Materials: Reinforced concrete

The Fort Hommet 10.5 cm coastal defence gun casemate bunker is a fully restored gun casemate that was part of Fortress Guernsey constructed by the forces of Nazi Germany between 1940 and 1945.

== Location ==
The bunker is in Castel on the northern side of Vazon Bay and is part of a complex of reinforced concrete fortifications built by the Germans on the site of Fort Hommet. Fort Hommet is on a headland that lies 3.3 miles (5.3 km) northwest of St Peter Port on the other side of the Island.

== History ==
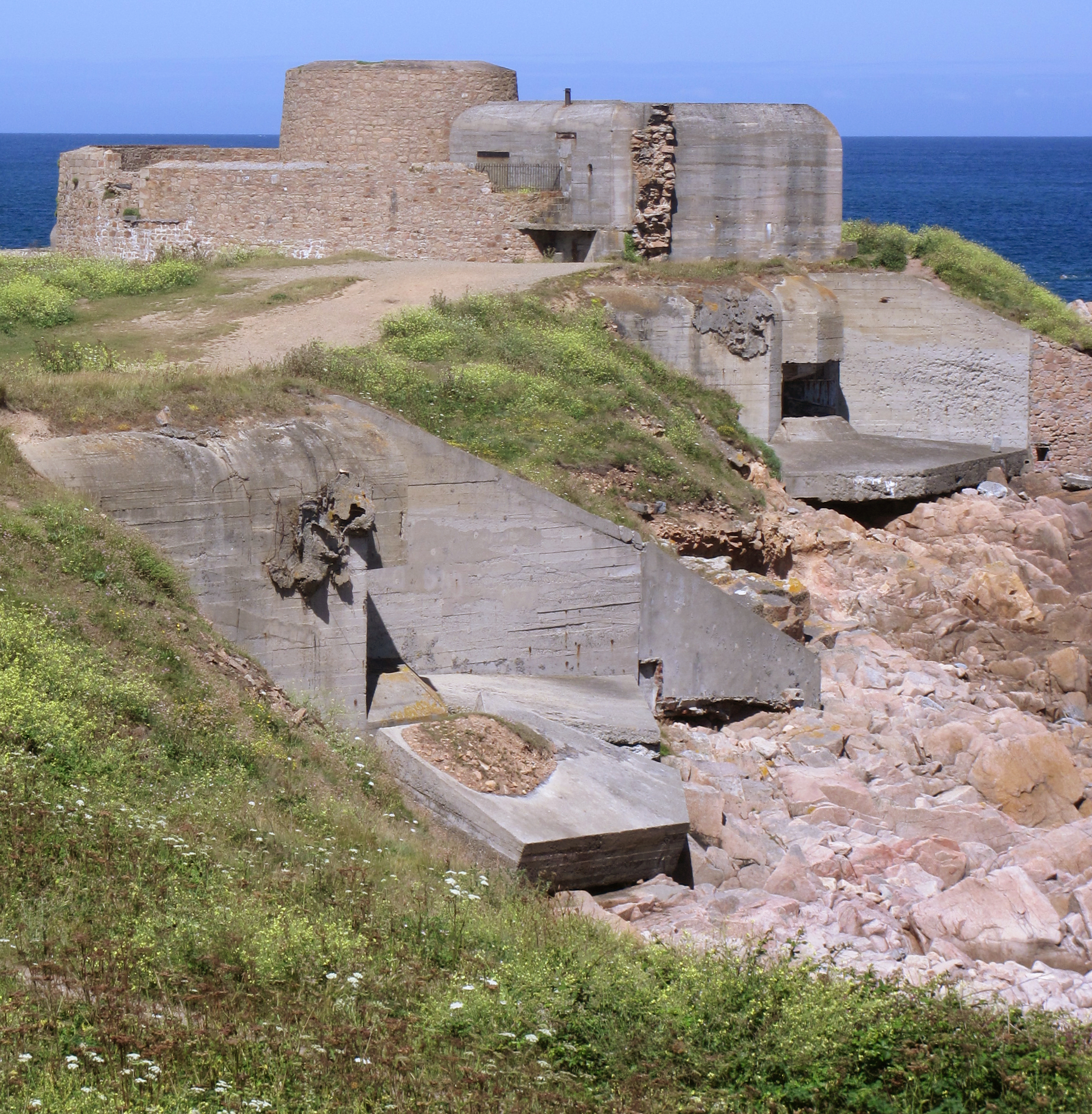
Fort Hommet complex of fortifications

Fort Hommet was constructed on the Vazon Bay Headland in the late Napoleonic Wars era as part of the anti-French defences although there had been fortifications recorded here as far back as 1680. A Martello tower was built on the site in 1804 with further batteries and a barracks being added later. On 20 October 1941, after the occupation of the Channel Islands, a directive ordered by Adolf Hitler proclaimed that the Islands would be turned into an impregnable reinforced concrete fortress as part of the Atlantic Wall, and the Organisation Todt constructed fortifications round the coast.

As part of these plans this restored casemate was one of 21 similar standard constructions of a design type Jäger, built to house 10.5cm K331(f) guns. Four such casemates were installed at Fort Hommet and make up part of Stützpunkt (Strongpoint) Rotenstein. The Jäger casemate being a Series 600 Regelbau construction, named after the Organisation Todt officer who designed it.

=== 1943 construction ===
The construction work began in April 1943 after the completion of a railway link between Vazon and St Peter Port which was the essential link needed for the transportation of the vast quantity of materials required to build the fortifications. The schedule of work consisted of initial site excavations followed by a concrete base poured. Wooden shuttering would then be built and steel reinforcing would be installed in the form of cradles. The concrete would then be poured in a continuous fashion giving each structure its immense strength. Once cured, the shuttering was removed and the bunker was fitted out. The process was carried out in a matter of weeks.

=== Design ===
Looking at the plan and starting at 12 o'clock you have the gun room, at 1 o'clock the spent shell room, 3 - crew room with escape shaft, 5- anti-gas lock with entrance defence, 6- entrance, 7 and 9 - two ammunition rooms, 10 o'clock the ventilation plant.

=== Liberation ===
After the liberation of Guernsey in 1945, most fortifications were stripped of all their fixtures and fittings by both the British Army and the islanders. By the late 1940s almost all the metal fittings including guns and blast doors were removed for their scrap value. Many of the bunkers including this casemate at Fort Hommet, were buried in an attempt to return the coastal landscape to its pre-war condition.

== Restoration ==
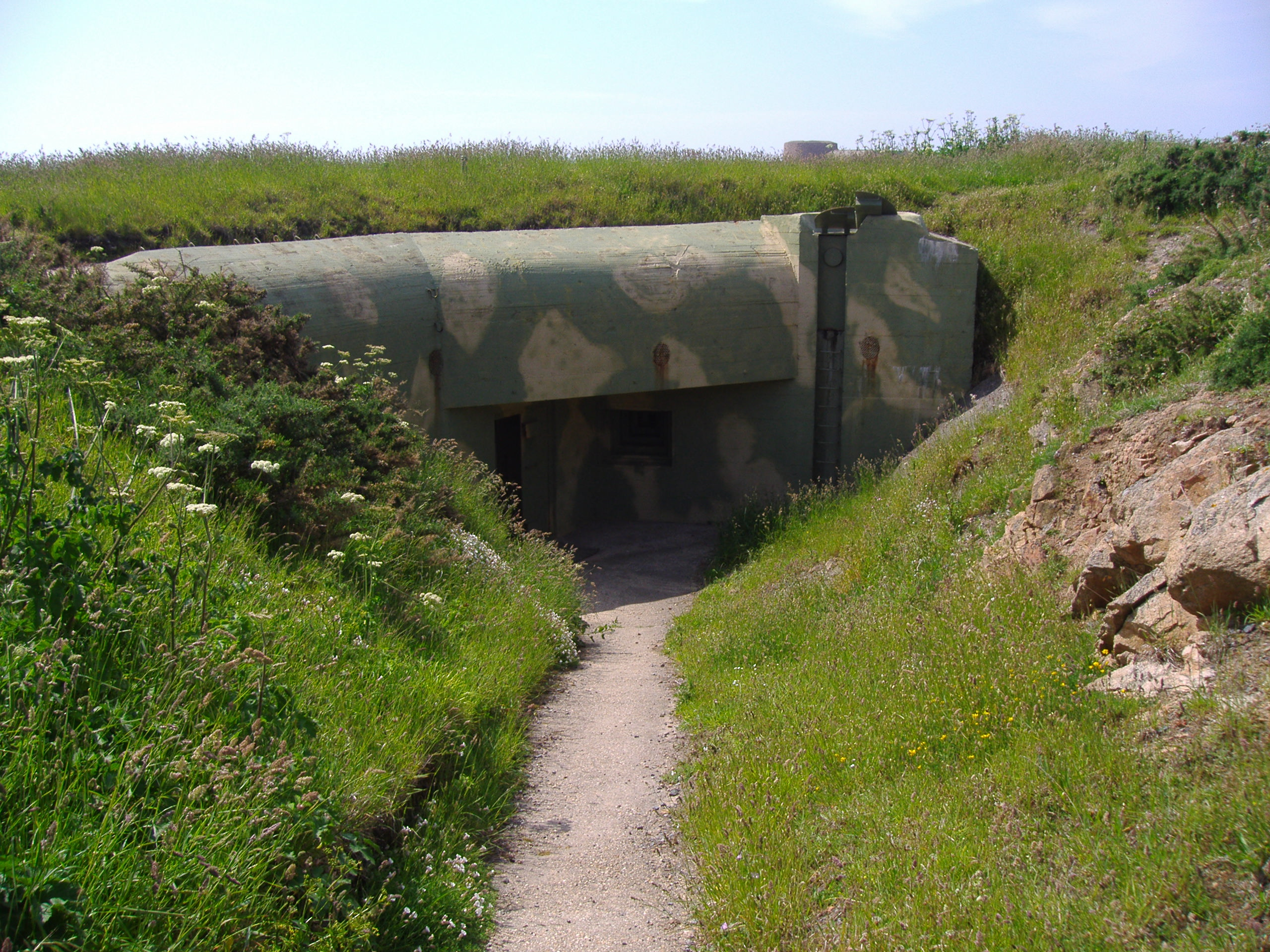
The Entrance to the Casemate

As part of Guernsey's fiftieth liberation celebrations, and part of the project Fortress Guernsey, the States of Guernsey had all the 10.5 cm casemates on the island surveyed with a view to restoring the best example. This casemate was found to be dry and structurally sound although it was just a bare shell. The entrance to the casemate was excavated in April 1993 and restoration work began.

The restoration was completed in 1995 and is open to the public on two afternoons from April to October.

== See also ==
- German occupation of the Channel Islands
- German fortification of Guernsey
- Living with the enemy in the German-occupied Channel Islands
