= Sd.Kfz. 8 =

Schwerer Zugkraftwagen 12 t, Sd.Kfz. 8
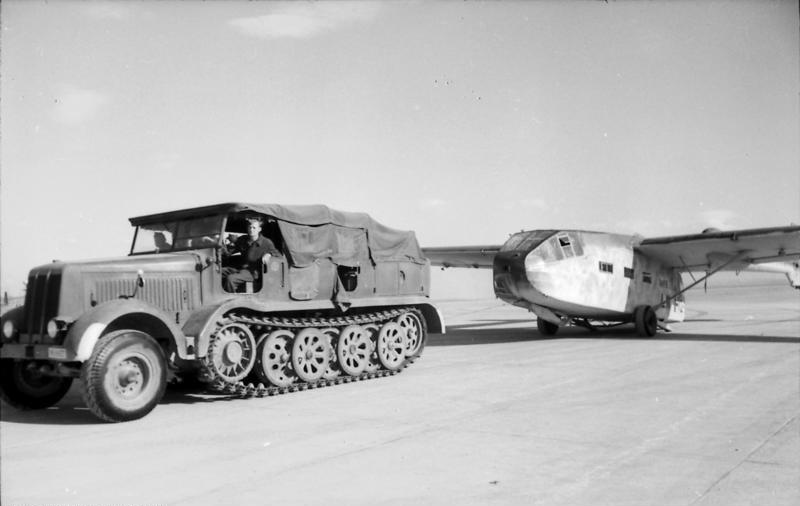
- A Sd.Kfz. 8 towing a Gotha Go 242 glider
- Type: Heavy half-track
- Place of origin: Nazi Germany

Service history
- In service: 1939–1945
- Used by: Nazi Germany; Czechoslovakia; Romania; Bulgaria
- Wars: World War II

Production history
- Designer: Daimler-Benz
- Designed: 1936–1939
- Manufacturer: Daimler-Benz, Krupp, Krauss-Maffei, Škoda
- Unit cost: 46,000 RM
- Produced: 1937–1944
- No. built: approx. 4,000

Specifications (DB 10)
- Mass: 14,700 kg (32,400 lb)
- Length: 7.35 m (24 ft 1 in)
- Width: 2.5 m (8 ft 2 in)
- Height: 2.77 m (9 ft 1 in) overall
- Crew: 2 + 11
- Engine: 8.5L Maybach HL85 TUKRM water-cooled V12 petrol 185 PS (182 hp; 136 kW)
- Payload capacity: 2,550 kg (5,620 lb)
- Transmission: ZF 4 + 1 speed
- Suspension: torsion bar
- Ground clearance: 40 cm (16 in)
- Fuel capacity: 250 L (55 imp gal; 66 US gal)
- Operational range: 250 km (160 mi) road 125 km (78 mi) cross-country
- Maximum speed: 51 km/h (32 mph) road 21 km/h (13 mph) cross-country

The Sonderkraftfahrzeug 8 ("special motorized vehicle 8"), usually abbreviated to Sd.Kfz. 8, was a German half-track designed by Daimler-Benz that saw widespread use in World War II. Its main roles were as a prime mover for heavy towed guns such as the 21 cm Mörser 18, the 17 cm Kanone 18 and the 10.5 cm FlaK 38. It also served as an infantry transport. Approximately 4,000 were produced between 1938 and 1945. It was used in every campaign fought by the Germans in World War II, notably the Invasion of Poland, the Battle of France, the Balkans Campaign, the Eastern Front, the North African Campaign, the Battle of Normandy and the Italian Campaign.

== Description ==
The final version of the Sd.Kfz. 8, the DB 10, was powered by a Maybach 12-cylinder, water-cooled, 8.52-litre (520 cu in) HL85 TUKRM gasoline engine developing 185 PS (182 hp; 136 kW) at 2,500 rpm. It had a ZF transmission with four forward and one reverse gears in both high and low ratios. It had two fuel tanks, a main one of 210 litres (55 US gal) and a reserve of 40 L (11 US gal) capacity. The driver's seat was mounted on top of the main tank in the cab.

Both tracks and wheels were used for steering. The steering system was set up so that shallow turns used only the wheels, but brakes would be applied to the tracks the farther the steering wheel was turned. The drive sprocket had rollers rather than the more common teeth. The rear suspension consisted of six double roadwheels, overlapping and interleaved in the usual Schachtellaufwerk system used for German half-track vehicles, mounted on swing arms sprung by torsion bars. The torsion bars were enclosed inside the lateral members of the ladder frame chassis. Track idler wheels were used to control track tension via an adjusting mechanism at the rear of the vehicle. The front wheels had leaf springs and shock absorbers.

The upper body had a crew compartment with three bench seats, one for the driver and his assistant, and two others for the crew. The rear cargo area contained storage compartments, one on each side and two in the rear. The windshield could fold forward and was also removable. A convertible canvas top was mounted above the rear storage compartments. It fastened to the windshield when erected.

The Sd.Kfz. 8 was initially designed to have a towing capacity of 12 tonnes (12 long tons; 13 short tons), but the wartime DB 10 could tow 14 tonnes (14 long tons; 15 short tons).

== Design and development ==
Preliminary design of all the German half-tracks of the early part of the war was done by Dipl.Ing. Ernst Kniepkamp of the "Military Automotive Department" (Wa Prüf 6) before the Nazis took power in 1933. His designs were then turned over to commercial firms for development and testing. Daimler-Benz had been working on its own half-track design during 1931–1932, the ZD.5. It weighed 9.3 tonnes (9.2 long tons; 10.3 short tons), used a twelve-cylinder, 150 hp (110 kW) Maybach DSO 8 gasoline engine and its upper body had three bench seats behind the driver. Its suspension was based on the World War I-era Marienwagen II and bore absolutely no relation to the interleaved roadwheels and torsion bars used by the various models of the Sd.Kfz. 8.

Daimler-Benz combined the best of both designs in the DB s7 prototype which appeared in 1934. It used the same engine as the ZD.5, but otherwise bore little resemblance to the older model other than an upper body that had two bench seats for the crew behind the driver's seat. This upper body remained the same over the life of the Sd.Kfz. 8. It weighed 14.4 tonnes (14.2 long tons; 15.9 short tons) and could pull loads of 12 tonnes (12 long tons; 13 short tons). An improved version was introduced in 1936 as the DB s8.

The heavier (15 tonnes (15 long tons; 17 short tons)) DB 9 model appeared in 1938. It used the Maybach HL85 TUKRM engine, could carry an 800-kilogram (1,800 lb) payload and could tow a 14-tonne (14-long-ton; 15-short-ton) load. Daimler-Benz tried unsuccessfully to use their diesel OM 48/1 engine, but it was repeatedly rejected by the Army Weapons Office.

The DB 10 introduced in October 1939 was a refined version of the DB 9 with a new gearbox and transmission: this final version was produced until 1944.

=== Variants ===
Ten 8.8 cm Flak 18 anti-aircraft guns were mounted on pedestals on DB s8 and DB 9 chassis in 1939 as the 8.8 cm Flak 18 (Sfl.) auf Zugkraftwagen 12t (Sd.Kfz. 8) — also known as the Bunkerflak or Bufla — for anti-tank duties. A gun shield was provided for the gun, but the gun crew had no other protection. The driver's cab was replaced by a lower, armored cupola and the engine compartment was lightly (14.5 millimetres (0.57 in)) armored. The vehicle weighed 20 tonnes (20 long tons; 22 short tons), was 7.35 metres (24.1 ft) long, 2.8 metres (9.2 ft) tall and 2.65 metres (8.7 ft) wide. The gun could fire directly ahead without any problem, but traverse was limited to 151° to each side by the gun shield. Elevation was between -3° and +15°. All ten were assigned to the first company of the anti-tank battalion Panzerjäger-Abteilung 8 which participated in the Invasion of Poland in 1939, the Battle of France in 1940 and Operation Barbarossa in 1941. The company was redesignated as Panzerjäger-Kompanie ("Anti-Tank Company") 601 in January 1942 and then as the third company of Anti-Tank Battalion 559 the following April. It reported that the last three vehicles had been lost by March 1943.

== Production and use ==
Daimler-Benz and Krupp were the main builders of the Sd.Kfz. 8 during the war, with Krauss-Maffei producing 315 in 1940–1941; Škoda joined in the last years of the war making vehicles under the S10 designation.

Total production numbers are: 780 were built from 1934 to 1939; 516 in 1940; 828 in 1941; 840 in 1942; 507 in 1943; and 602 in 1944, for a total of 4070 vehicles of all variants. 1615 were on hand on 20 December 1942. The Sd.Kfz. 8 was used by Czechoslovakia after the war, but it is not known if production continued at Škoda or when they were finally discarded. The Sd.Kfz. 8 was also used by Romania during the war.

Unlike most of the other German half-tracks, the Sd.Kfz. 8 was mostly used as a tractor for heavy artillery pieces and was generally not modified for other roles (apart from the few anti-tank conversions mentioned above). The intended towed guns were the 15 cm Kanone 16; the 15 cm Kanone 18; the 10.5 cm FlaK 38, and the 21 cm Mörser 16. It was also capable of towing other artillery pieces such as the Škoda 30.5 cm Mörser, various models of the 8.8 cm Flak, and the 15 cm sFH 18,

Apart from towing artillery, the Sd.Kfz. 8 was also used as a recovery vehicle by tank maintenance crews and as a general heavy transport. For example, it was capable of towing a disabled Sd.Kfz. 6/2 in a straight pull and hauling a Panzer 38(t) on a steerable Sd. Ah. 116 tank transporter trailer.

In 1942, five Sd.Kfz. 8' coupled together were used to pull a trailer carrying a 30.5 cm (12.0 in) gun barrel for Batterie Mirus on Guernsey.

== See also ==
- List of Sd.Kfz. designations
