= La Valette Underground Military Museum =

Coordinates: 49.4482°N 2.5312°W

- Location: St Peter Port, Guernsey
- Type: Military museum
- Website: lavalette.uk

The La Valette Underground Military Museum is a museum located in German tunnels left over from the German occupation of the Channel Islands, and was converted into a museum between December 1987 and August 1988. The museum hosts a collection of artifacts from World War II and from the Guernsey Militia that served in World War I. The tunnels on the site were originally to be used for U-boat fuel storage. The museum also offers a gift shop selling books on the wars and occupation, as well as authentic patches and medals.

The museum is located in one of Guernsey’s 41 occupation tunnels, similar to the Hohlgangsanlage located on Jersey and across the Channel Islands.
