= List of castles in the Channel Islands =

This is a list of castles and forts in the Channel Islands.

== Guernsey ==
=== Guernsey ===
- Castle Cornet
- Fort Doyle
- Fort George
- Fort Grey
- Fort Le Marchant
- Fort Pembroke, Guernsey
- Fort Richmond, Guernsey
- Fort Saumarez
- Fort Hommet
- Vale Castle
- Fort Duquemin
- Bréhon Tower
- Fort Grandes Rocques

=== Alderney ===
- Château à L'Etoc
- Essex Castle
- Fort Albert
- Fort Clonque
- Fort Corblets
- Fort Doyle
- Fort Grosnez
- Fort Homeaux Florains
- Fort Houmet Herbe
- Fort Platte Saline
- Fort Quesnard
- Fort Raz
- Fort Tourgis

== Jersey ==
- Câtel Fort
- Elizabeth Castle
- Fort Regent
- Fort Henry, Jersey
- Fort Leicester, Jersey
- Grosnez Castle
- La Crête Fort
- L'Etacquerel Fort
- Mont Orgueil
- Saint Aubin's Fort

== See also ==
- List of castles
- Jersey Round Tower
