= Bréhon Tower =

19th-century Guernsey gun tower

Bréhon Tower
- Herm in Guernsey
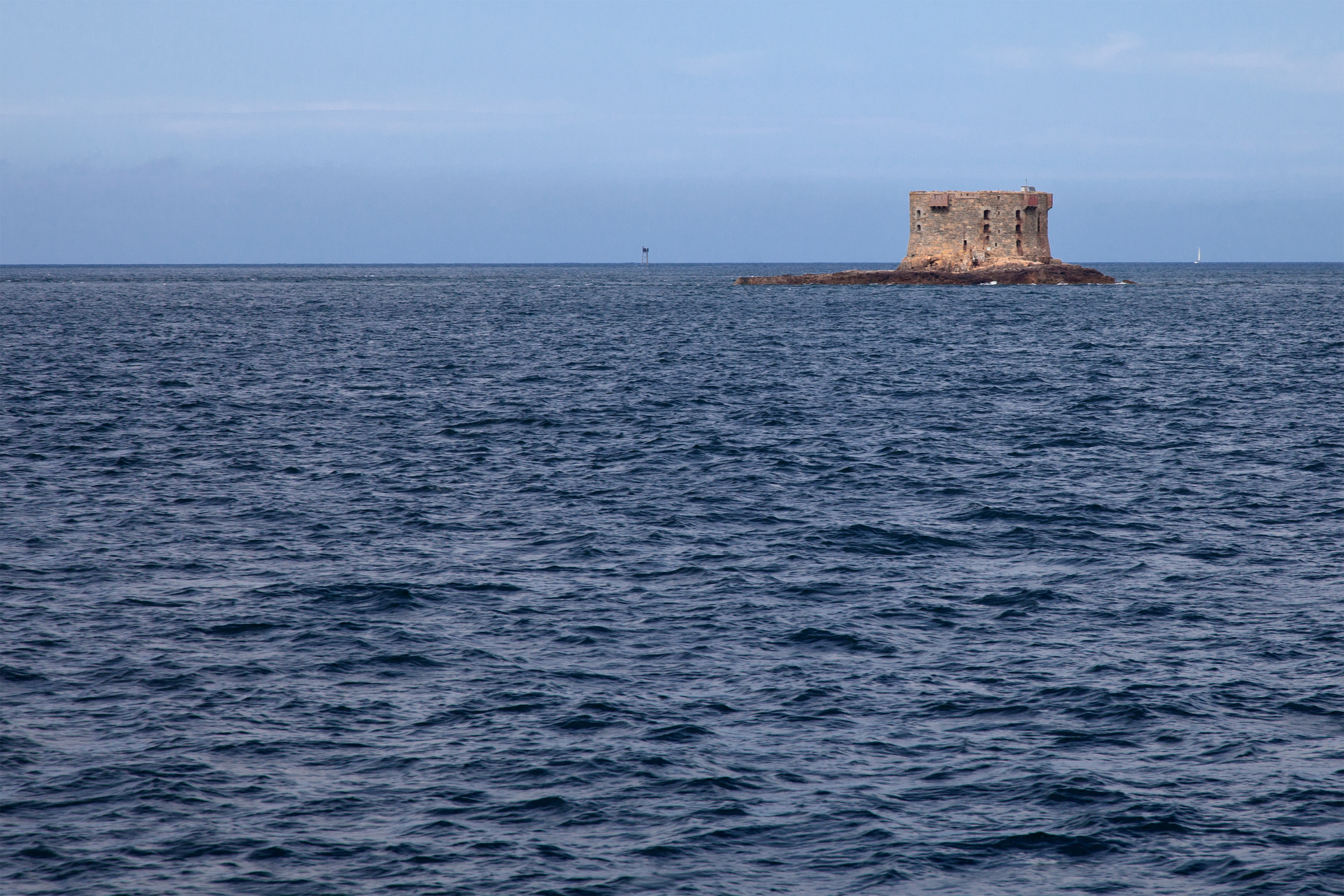
- From afar

Site information
- Type: Martello tower

Location
- Location in The Channel
- Coordinates: 49°28′16.4″N 2°29′17.3″W

Site history
- Built: 1856–1857
- Built by: Thomas Charles de Putron
- In use: 1744–1945
- Battles/wars: World War II

The Bréhon Tower (French pronunciation: [bʁeɔ̃]; or Fort Brehon) is accessible only by boat and sits on Bréhon Rock, an island in the Little Russell channel about 1.5 km northeast of St Peter Port, Guernsey, between the port and the islands of Herm and Jethou. Thomas Charles de Putron (1806–1869) built the oval tower of granite from Herm, completing the work in 1857.

Although not strictly a Martello tower, Bréhon represents the final evolution of the basic design of the Martello tower. In 1914 the War Office transferred ownership of Bréhon Tower to the States of Guernsey. During the German occupation of the Channel Islands, German forces placed coastal defence and anti-aircraft guns on the tower. Today, although the site is open to visitors, the tower is closed. The tower holds a light operated by the Guernsey Harbour Authority. The island is home to a breeding colony of common terns.

== History ==
An obelisk was erected on Bréhon in 1744 to serve as a sea mark. However the lack of visibility of the obelisk led to its replacement in 1824 by a tower 40 ft high and 34 ft in circumference, topped by a globe.

In the tenure (1803–1813) of Lieutenant Governor General Sir John Doyle, there were plans to erect a guardhouse on Bréhon, but nothing came of these. Doyle was responsible, however, for substantial fortification efforts elsewhere in Guernsey, including the construction of the Martello towers of Fort Grey, Fort Saumarez, and Fort Hommet.

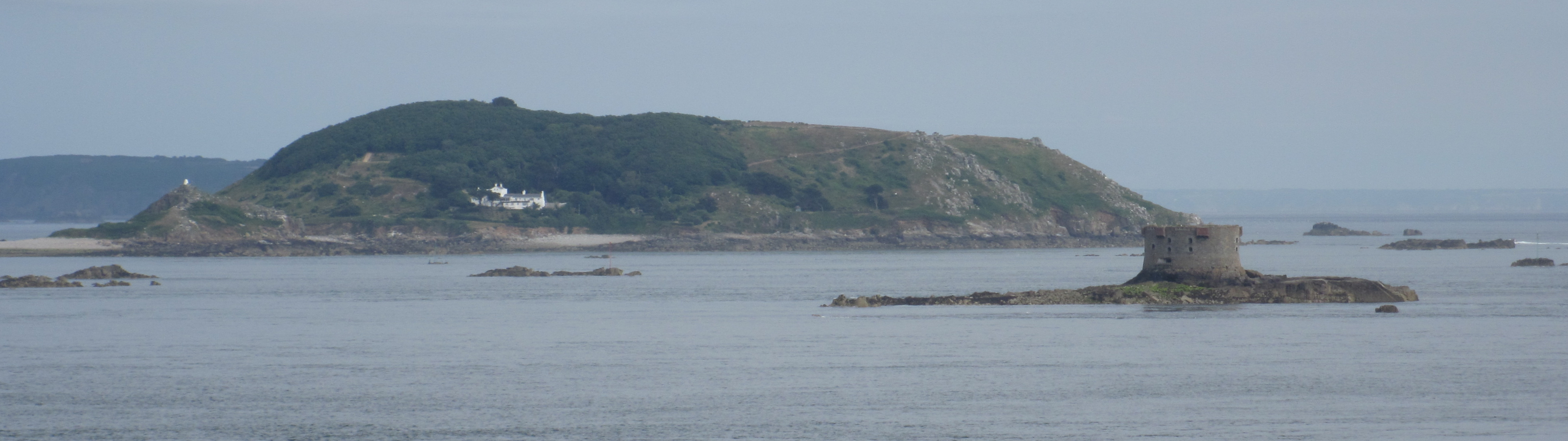
Bréhon Tower with Jethou in background

In the 1840s there was a renewed concern about British relations with France, with particular concern for the protection of Alderney and the other Channel Islands because of their strategic importance in the Channel. Lieutenant Governor Major-General Sir William Francis Patrick Napier proposed a number of works, including the establishment of a fort on Bréhon. In 1850 the British became concerned that the French had created fortifications at Cherbourg. This led to the construction of several defensive structures, including towers and forts, in the Channel area. The Alderney cutter Experiment was wrecked off Bréhon in March 1850; eight people drowned but Guernsey pilot boat Mary of Guernsey saved 20.

=== Tower ===
A review of Guerney's defences in 1852 recommended the construction of three artillery barracks, Fort Richmond, Fort Hommet, and Fort Le Marchant, the upgrading of Fort Doyle, and the construction of Bréhon Tower. Work on Bréhon Tower commenced in 1854 and was completed in 1856. (Note: Two other towers were built in England at the same time – the Pembroke Dock Gun Tower and the Spit of Grain Tower, Sheerness. In addition the British built Nothe Fort, on the Isle of Portland. On Alderney, they built Forts Clonque and Houmet Herbe.) The builder was Thomas Charles de Putron, who carried on business at the Pierre Percée. The total cost was £8,098 18s 10d.

Bréhon Tower's role was to guard the shipping channel between Guernsey and Herm, and help protect the harbour of St Peter Port. The fort's footprint measures 65 feet by 85 feet (at the widest point), and the tower stands 34 feet high. The tower has three levels. The magazine, shell room, shifting room, stores, and fresh-water cistern were all on the ground floor. It also had latrines on the same floor, a Victorian innovation. The first floor contained the garrison's living quarters. There is also a jetty on the St Peter Port side of the island.

The original plan was to put three heavy guns on the gun platform at the top, with five guns on the (second) floor below, sharing the 14 cannon ports. However, during construction the armament was cut back to three 68-pounder and two 10-inch shell guns, all on the gun platform. The guns had a range of 3,000m.

In 1859, when loading the guns, each of which weighed 5 tons, a barge capsized and sank; the gun was lost. When the garrison fired the cannons for the first time, the concussion created a fracture that extended from top to bottom.

The tower's garrison was drawn from the Royal Artillery. The garrison was originally to have consisted of two officers and 60 NOCs and other ranks, but with the reduction in armament, two officers and 30 men was deemed sufficient. Boats from Guernsey brought provisions and fresh drinking water; the cistern provided the water for general use.

=== 20th century ===
By World War I the tower was obsolete and the War Office turned it over to the States of Guernsey.

In World War II, German forces installed a 10.5 cm (4.1 in) coastal defence gun in a new embrasure cut in the north wall. They also put two 2 cm (0.79 in) anti-aircraft guns on the roof of the tower.

The German guns were credited with shooting down several aircraft. On 14 May 1943, RAF Spitfires of the Czechoslovak-manned 312 and 313 Squadrons made a low-altitude attack on a flotilla of 12 E-boats in St Peter Port in an operation called Roadstead 2. Bréhon Tower's guns fired flak at the Spitfires, so Flying Officer Jaroslav Novák of 312 Squadron flew at the tower in a direct attack. His Spitfire Mk Vb, serial number EP539, was shot down and Novák was killed. A year later, on 22 May 1944, Bréhon Tower's guns shot down Flight Lieutenant Hugh Percy of 610 Squadron. He was flying a Spitfire Mk XIV, serial number RB162.

It was claimed that Bréhon Tower also shot down one German aircraft. It was a Focke-Wulf Fw 190 that crashed east of Herm.

== Protection ==
Brehon Tower and the islet upon which it stands was listed as a Protected Monument on 30 September 1969, reference PM54.

== Link ==
Link to a video of the interior of the Brehon Tower.

== Notes, citations, and references ==
=== References ===
- Bruce, H.A., ed. (1864) Life of General Sir William Napier, K. C. B., author of 'History of the Peninsular War', etc: Edited by H. A. Bruce. With portraits. (J. Murray)
- Clements, William H. (1998) Towers of Strength: Martello Towers Worldwide. (London: Pen & Sword). ISBN 978-0-85052-679-0.
- Forty, George (2005) Channel Islands at War: A German Perspective. (Ian Allan). ISBN 978-0711030718
- Grimsley, E.J. (1988) The historical development of the Martello Tower in the Channel Islands. (Sarnian Publications). ISBN 978-0951386804
- Lowry, Bernard (2008) Fortifications From the Tudors to the Cold War. (Osprey Publishing). ISBN 9780747806516
