= Fort Doyle =

Fort Doyle may refer to:

- Fort Doyle (Guernsey), a fort built in 1803
- Fort Doyle (Alderney), a fortification of Alderney, built in 1793
