= Royal Alderney Militia =

British Army military unit

- Active: 1337–1929
- Disbanded: 1929
- Country: United Kingdom
- Allegiance: The British Crown
- Branch: British Army
- Type: Militia
- Role: Coastal artillery and engineers
- Size: c. 350
- Garrison/HQ: Alderney
- Engagements: First World War

The Royal Alderney Militia (French: Milice d'Aurigny) was the reserve defence force of the Channel Island of Alderney, part of the British Crown Dependency of the Bailiwick of Guernsey. The raising of a militia was authorised by Edward III in 1337 but the first known appointment of a commander did not come until 1657. The unit was formalised in 1777 and received its first uniforms in 1781. Its main role was to man coastal fortifications around the island and a small party successfully repelled a French invasion in 1780 or 1781. The unit was granted the right to use the "royal" title in 1831. Some members served in the Royal Garrison Artillery during the First World War but British funding ceased in 1928 and the militia was disbanded the following year. The name was reused in 1984 for a newly raised unit of the Army Cadet Force.

== Early history ==
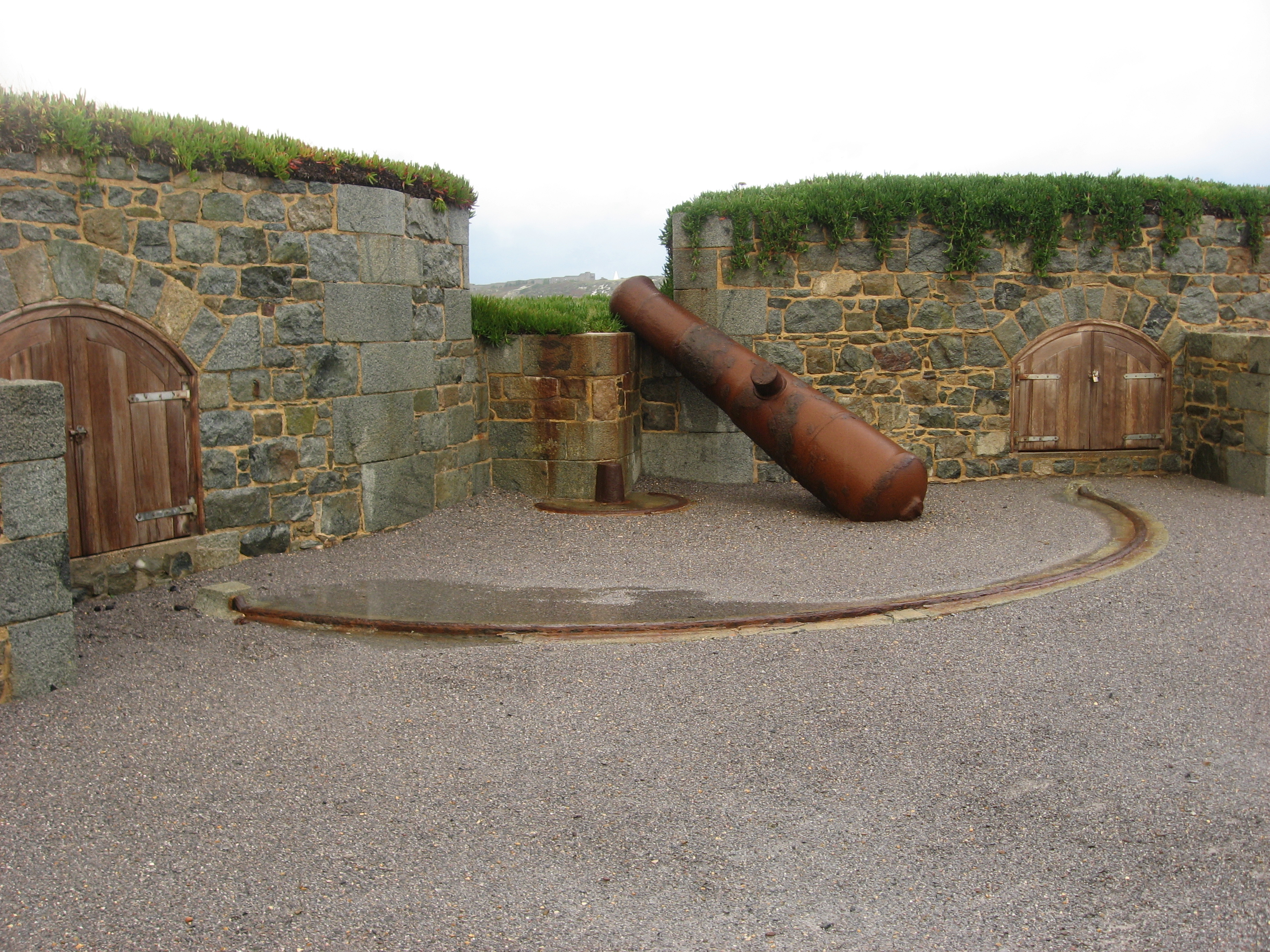
A surviving cannon at Fort Clonque, Alderney

The Keeper of the Channel Islands, Sir Thomas de Ferrers, was authorised by Edward III to raise militias on Jersey, Guernsey, Sark and Alderney in 1337 but the first record of the appointment of a commander of the Alderney militia was in 1657. By the middle of the 18th century it amounted to 200 men. The militia was placed on a formal standing in 1777 and received its first uniforms in 1781. Unusually for a dependency militia the uniforms of the unit were funded directly by HM Treasury. The superintendence of the militia lay with the Governor of Alderney until that hereditary position was resigned to the crown in 1824 when responsibility transferred to the Governor of Guernsey and later the Lieutenant Governor of Guernsey. The governor appointed officers and was responsible for mobilisation and regulation of the unit.

The militia's main role was to man the fortifications around the island. In the summer of 1780 or 1781 four men of the militia repelled an attempted invasion by 200 French soldiers. The men were manning a guardhouse at Château à l'Étoc when they spotted the ships within musket range and opened fire with cannon, killing several Frenchmen. The shots were heard by a British privateer who beat to arms (sounding a drum), this was heard by the French who supposed that it came from a sizable militia force and departed at dawn. The British privateer chased the French vessels back to Cherbourg.

Previous practice had been to supply a regular garrison to the island only in times of crisis but from 1782 until 1929 there was a permanent regular army presence, though sometimes this was little more than a small detachment of the Royal Artillery to assist in manning the guns of the fortifications. Due to the threat of French invasion during the Revolutionary and Napoleonic Wars the militia grew in strength to 350 men by 1809.

In 1830 the Lieutenant Governor of Guernsey, Lieutenant-General Sir John Ross reported that the Alderney militia was "totally inefficient" and in October 1842 his successor, Major-General William Craig Emilius Napier wrote that it was "useless ... because the defence of that island can never be made by its militia". In 1831 the militias of Guernsey, Sark and Alderney were granted the right to prefix Royal to their names by William IV, who had twice visited Guernsey. The General Militia Order issued by the Home Secretary (William Lamb, 2nd Viscount Melbourne), was made on the 50th anniversary of the Battle of Jersey, a defeat of a French invasion force by the Royal Militia of the Island of Jersey.

By the late 19th century the militia carried out its training on the guns at Fort Albert. In 1882 an armoury was constructed for the militia in Ollivier Street; this was demolished by the early 1950s.

== 20th century ==
By 1902 the Royal Alderney Militia was designated as solely an artillery unit, an engineer section was added some time later. All ranks wore a shoulder title reading "ALDERNEY"; a separate badge stating "RA" or "RE" was worn above the title to indicate membership of the artillery or engineer sections respectively. Conscription into the militia ended in 1905, after which it was a volunteer-only force. Some members of the militia volunteered for service during the First World War and were assigned to 112 Company of the Royal Garrison Artillery. From 1920 new recruits received a British Army service number, being allocated numbers in a block between 7,539,001 and 7,560,000, along with members of the Royal Guernsey Militia.

British government funding for the militia ceased in 1928 and the militia was disbanded in 1929. The guns were removed from Fort Albert and the Roseile Battery and the War Department sold many of the smaller forts and batteries in the 1930s. An Army Cadet Force unit was established on the island by Lieutenant-Colonel Peter Walter, a former SAS and Parachute Regiment officer, in 1984 and assumed the name of the Royal Alderney Militia.
