= Raz Island (Alderney) =

Islet near Alderney

- Interactive map of Raz Island

Raz Island, also called Ile de Raz, is an islet off the coast of Alderney. It is home to Fort Ile de Raz, a Victorian-era fort, which is part of the Fortifications of Alderney.
