= Fort Tourgis =

Fort on Alderney, Channel Islands

Coordinates: 49.7192°N 2.2194°W

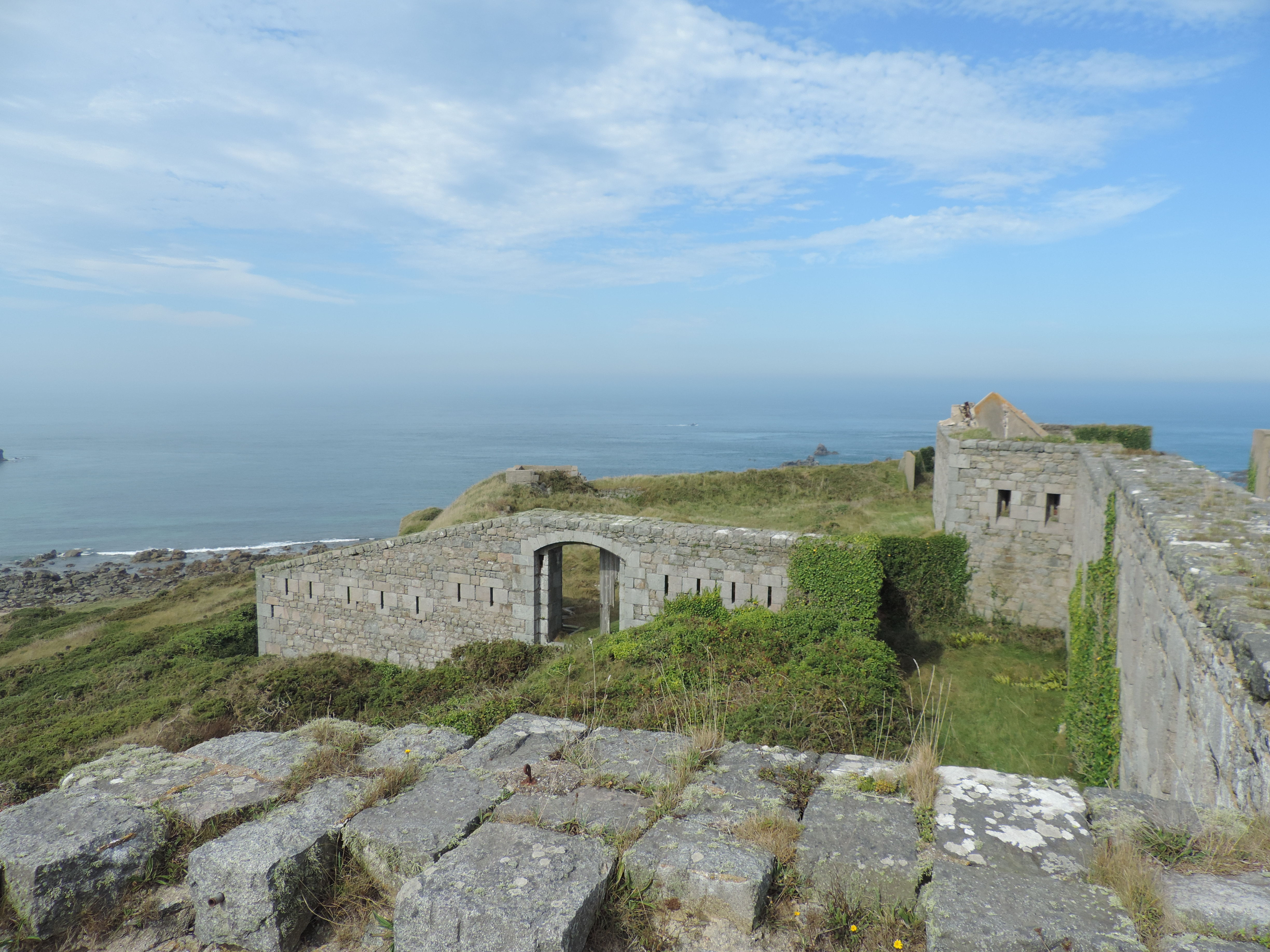
- Ruins of Fort Tourgis

Site information
- Type: Coastal fort

Site history
- Events: German occupation of the Channel Islands

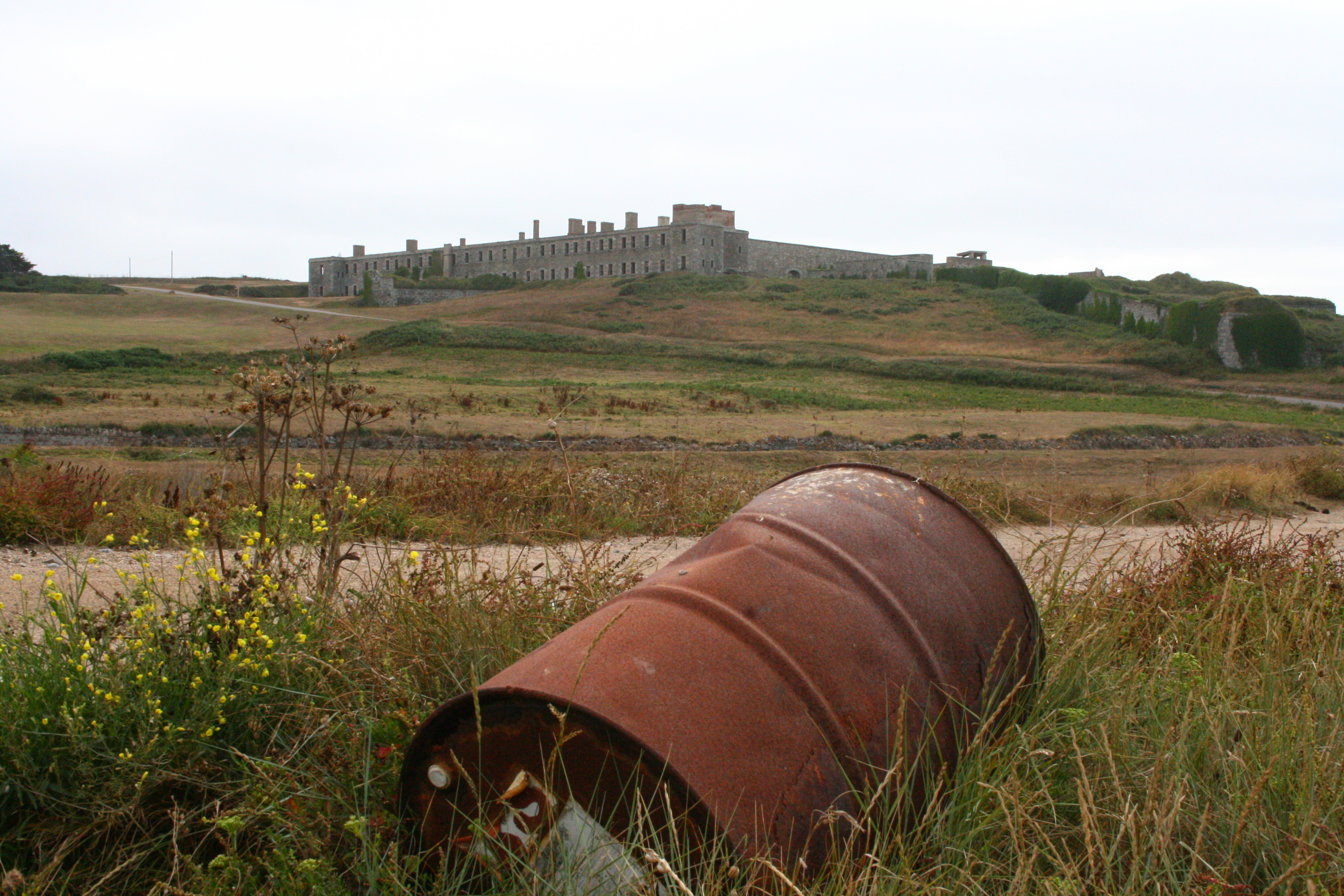
Fort Tourgis in 2010

Fort Tourgis is an extensive fortification in Alderney to the north west of St Anne forming part of the Fortifications of Alderney inside the Bailiwick of Guernsey.

== Design ==
Fort Tourgis, completed in 1855, was designed to accommodate 346 men and was originally to be the largest of Alderney's Victorian forts. It was also designed to mount 33 heavy cannon in five batteries together with four 13-inch mortars. Fort Albert, begun a year later in 1856, was to become the island's largest and most heavily armed fort, but even today Tourgis remains a very impressive structure.

Alderney's Victorian forts were designed to defend the island and its harbour, which was planned to accommodate a British fleet to respond to French naval power in the Channel. From 1860, advances in weapons, particularly the rise of rifled ordnance, and ironclad ship design, made the island's 18 forts and batteries, and the new harbour, increasingly obsolete. However several forts, including Tourgis, were later armed with more modern gun designs. In 1886 the island's defenses consisted of 124 guns, mortars and howitzers; by 1893 only Fort Albert and Roselle Battery were armed, with Fort Grosnez having two practice guns manned by the Royal Alderney Militia. By 1908 only Fort Albert with the two newly installed six-inch guns (1901) and Roselle Battery, with its two 12-pounder QF guns, defended the island. Military History

From July 1940, after Alderney and the other Channel Islands had been occupied by the Germans, the defenses were designed both to protect the sea route from Cherbourg to St Malo, and to resist potential British assault to recapture the only part of the British Isles to be occupied by Germany. Fort Tourgis became Stutzpunkt Türkenburg, or Strongpoint Turk's Castle. Fort Tourgis has a citadel containing the barrack block, main magazine and other facilities, together with two small gun batteries, one facing west (three guns) and one east (two guns) in the Redan. The fort's main armament was located in three major batteries facing seawards. The batteries are separated from each other, and from the Citadel, by ditches and drawbridges.

Following extensive clearance and conservation work, co-ordinated by the Living Islands Project, with volunteers supported by the States Works department, part of the northern defenses of Fort Tourgis is now open to the public. Cambridge Battery (No.2) is an excellent example of how the original Victorian fortifications were adapted by German forces in the Second World War, when Alderney became one of the most heavily fortified sections of Hitler's Atlantic Wall.

== Description ==
By the 1920s, Alderney was effectively demilitarized, only to have a new lease of life during the Second World War when occupied by the Germans. They constructed five artillery batteries, 23 anti-aircraft batteries, 13 strongpoints, 12 resistance nests, three defense lines and emplaced over 30,000 mines on this small island.

Fort Tourgis was known to the Germans as Stutzpunkt Türkenburg or Strongpoint Turk's Castle. It had a three-gun 20 mm Flak battery, two 10.5 cm beach defence guns, two 7.5 cm Pak guns, several searchlights and numerous machine guns.

Since 1945, the growth of scrub over the fort offers ideal habitat for invertebrates, small mammals, and birds. Kestrels use the musketry loops in the eastern wall to nest, with the fields and grassland outside as their hunting grounds. Stonechat and even the occasional Dartford warbler can be seen displaying on the shrubs that thrust up through the brambles.

=== German Tunnel ===
This tunnel passes under the Victorian wall and enters the fort through the former magazine of Cambridge Battery. It enabled easy access between the fort and the gun bunkers outside, as well as providing a shorter route from the fort to Platte Saline and beyond.

The extent and concentration of concrete structures built by the occupying forces has, through time, become home to a wide range of wildlife. Ranging from barn swallows (which often nest in this tunnel) to a UK rarity, the Bloxworth snout moth, these spaces provide the ideal habitat, and a perfect place for those wishing to observe them.

=== Victorian Magazine ===
This part of the fort, used for storing powder, shells and shot, would have supplied Cambridge Battery and was constructed to be secure and dry.

When it was first built, Cambridge (No. 2) Battery at Fort Tourgis mounted eight smooth-bore 68- pounders and 32-pounders, firing spherical solid or explosive shot The powder charges would have been made up in the magazine and packed into sacks. These would have been taken out to the gun crews, and rammed into the gun barrels, followed by solid shot or explosive shell. The Germans also probably used the magazine as they constructed a very thick concrete wall for extra protection.

=== Cambridge Battery ===
Battery No. 2 was one of five in the Victorian fort. Situated at the fort's north-east corner, it housed 68-pounder and 32-pounder smoothbore guns. These fired en barbette over walls topped with earthen ramparts. The guns were mounted on heavy timber platforms that rotated on iron pivots with small metal wheels. These ran on the semi-circular and circular racer rails that can still be clearly seen.

The Battery's defenses included a long south-east facing loop-holed wall for musketry fire, together with a caponier projecting northwards to flank the fort's northern face (see plan).

=== German generator/personnel shelter ===
Although its purpose is not known for certain, it is likely that this bunker could have contained a small generator to power the adjacent 60 cm searchlight position. An alternative or additional use might have been as a personnel shelter. The bunker stands in a position once occupied by a Victorian heavy gun, which was mounted on a pivot and racer now buried under the concrete. One may notice the presence of nesting sparrows, with up to three active nests being present in some years.

=== German 60cm searchlight bunker ===
During the First and Second World Wars, searchlights were an essential part of all defenses. They were used to illuminate the sea and skies during night operations. Frequently, they were used in conjunction with sound detectors and also radar. There were a total of at least 35 German searchlights on Alderney, 24 of them being 60 cm in diameter, with six of these being housed in bunkers unique to the island. The 60 cm unit mounted in this unusual emplacement was able to be moved into position on the rails that can still be seen in the floor, with the unit stored in the adjacent recessed area. A turntable allowed it to be moved into position from this recess to cover sea, beach attacks, and possibly aerial attacks, on the strongpoint. It had a range of over 5 kilometers.

=== Fort Tourgis Wildlife ===
The searchlight emplacement looks out both seaward and back into the fort itself. Since its abandonment Fort Tourgis has been reclaimed by nature. Several species such as kestrel, buzzard, meadow pipit, stonechat, and white-toothed shrew have taken up residence in the fort.

=== Tourgis searchlight bunker ===
From the searchlight emplacement there is a panoramic view of Clonque Bay and Platte Saline. Eastwards, you can see across to the Victorian Forts Doyle and Grosnez. The left, westward, side of the view takes in a good deal of Alderney's Ramsar site, an area of rocky coast, islets and seabed habitats protected under the Ramsar convention on wetlands of international importance.

The upwellings created by the tidal flows of Alderney's Swinge provide the nutrients that attract fish, and in turn seabirds, to the Living Islands, making Alderney the seabird centre of the English Channel. White gannets with their black wingtips, often flying in formation; black shags drying their wings on rocks; brown curlews with their long downward curved beaks, and the little white egrets stabbing fish in the rockpools can be seen on the shore.

=== Victorian tunnel to caponier ===
This tunnel allowed easy access to the caponier from the battery. In Victorian times, there would have been no other access to the secure caponier from outside the fort. It would probably have been lit by oil lamps.

=== Victorian caponier ===
From its modern internal appearance, the caponier appears to be from the era of the Second World War, but it has been modified and strengthened, by adding a concrete lining to the original stone walls. This provided an emplacement for two German machine guns. Most of their bunkers were whitewashed inside, while larger ones were often lined with timber cladding on walls and floor. From the outside, the caponier is clearly part of the Victorian defenses, and would have featured musketry loopholes to enable fire along the walls of the fort, protecting them from assault. Many forts featured caponiers as part of their defenses. Other examples can be seen in Alderney at Forts Clonque, Raz, and even on the east side of the Tourgis Citadel. They are an essential part of the defenses of Fort Albert, a later and more modern design, where the deep ditch is defended by five caponiers.

=== German MG and PaK bunker ===
This large space combined a machine gun position and a 7.5 cm Pak 40 mobile anti-tank gun, covering the wide arc of fire visible through the large embrasure. The towed Pak gun was able to traverse around a track, the position of which can still be seen in the concrete floor. This bunker of an unknown type was of Reinforced Field Order standard being constructed with concrete over one meter thick. A large, probably bullet-proof, door would have permitted easy access for the Pak gun. With the exception of the 10.5 cm Jäger bunker, none of the bunkers were gas-proofed.

=== Strongpoint Turkenburg ===
After June 1940, Alderney was occupied by German forces and heavily fortified. Fort Tourgis, with its strong defensive position on a hillside facing the sea, was an ideal site for defensive warfare. For example, the development of the tank and amphibious assault using landing craft required heavy beach defenses and anti-tank guns. The first bunker as you enter the strongpoint housed both an anti-tank and a machine gun. There is a tunnel from the Victorian caponier, accessed from the 7.5 cm Pak bunker leading up to the Victorian battery. This caponier was lined with concrete by the Germans and mounted machine guns as well as having two west-facing weapon positions.

Following extensive clearance and conservation work with volunteers supported by the States Works department, part of the northern defenses of Fort Tourgis is now open to the public. Cambridge Battery (No.2) and its later German bunkers are an excellent example of how the original Victorian fortifications were adapted by German forces in the Second World War, when Alderney became one of the most heavily fortified sections of Hitler's Atlantic Wall.

=== German 10.5cm beach defence gun bunker ===
This impressive large Jäger bunker housed a 10.5 cm K331 (f) beach defence gun. This particular type had both accommodation and a magazine and was only constructed in the Channel Islands. The 10.5 cm captured French gun would have covered the wide beach of Platte Saline which like many other beaches on the island was vulnerable to assault by landing craft and tanks.

== Redevelopment ==
As of December 2012, plans to redevelop the fort exist. An agreement on redevelopment had lapsed, and no construction work had been started. The derelict fort remains under the control of the States of Alderney.
