= The Odeon (Alderney) =

German coastal defense tower

- St. Anne, Alderney
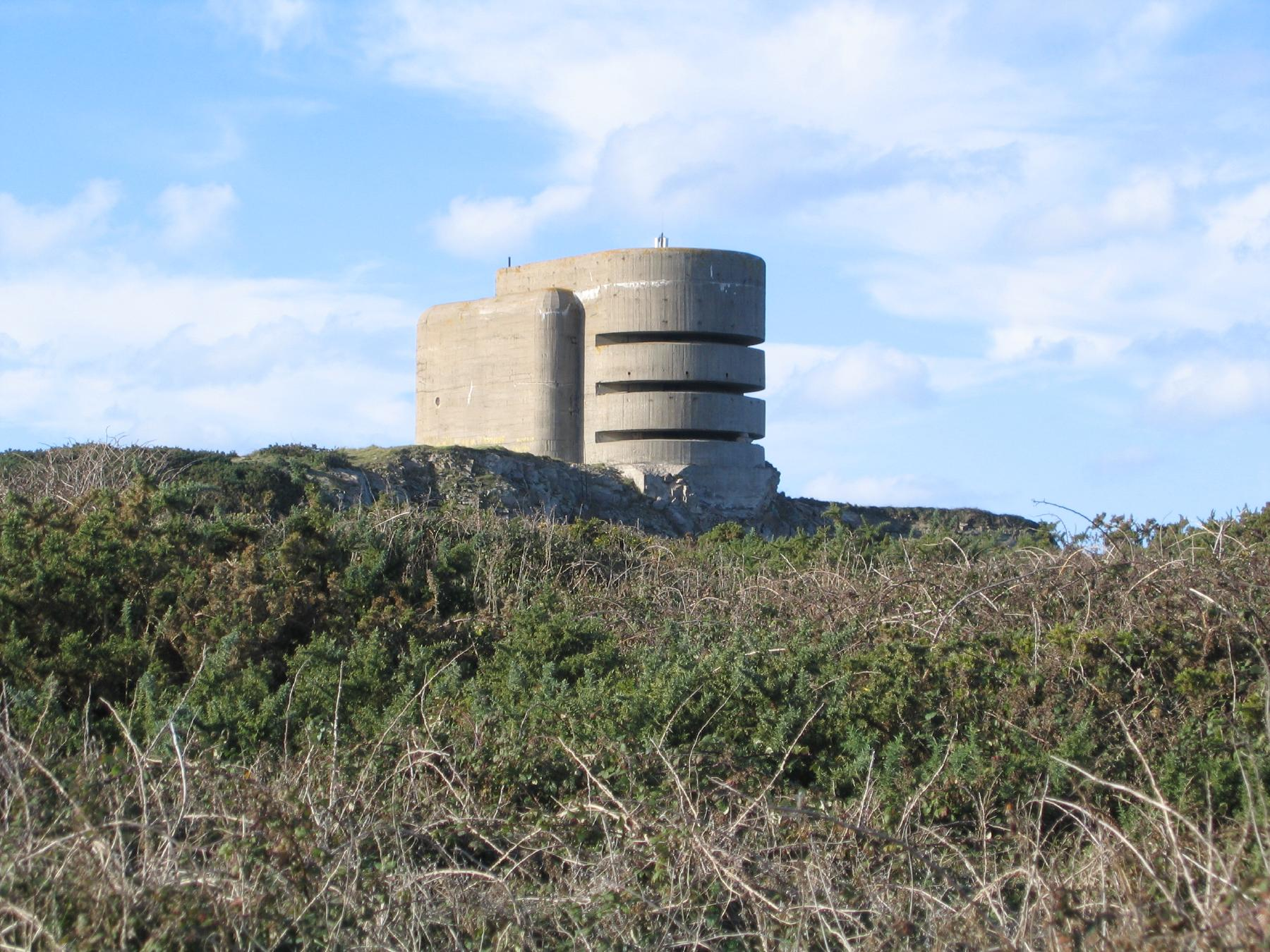

Site information
- Type: German naval range-finding position (MP3 tower)

Location
- Shown within Channel Islands
- Coordinates: 49.7270107°N 2.1681046°W

Site history
- Battles/wars: None
- Events: German occupation of the Channel Islands

The Odeon is a German coastal defense tower on the island of Alderney in the Channel Islands. It is sometimes considered as part of the Fortifications of Alderney. It was built to defend Alderney from the British during the German occupation of the Channel Islands in World War II. Currently, the Odeon is fully accessible and has a small exhibit inside and outside describing its function as part of the Atlantic Wall. It is located on top of a small cliff.

== History ==
Adolf Hitler ordered for geological surveys of the Channel Islands as early as June 2, 1941, and issued an order on October 20, 1941, for fortifications to be built, as he forecasted small-scale liberation efforts by the Allies, using the islands as stepping stones to Europe. Hitler himself stated that the strength of the defences would be based on the Western Wall. Organization Todt would take to building the Atlantic Wall, and by the spring of 1943, at least 260,000 men were forced to work on fortifications on the Channel Islands. At least 100 of those men died on Alderney alone in concentration camps, forts like the Odeon, and bunkers. Originally, 6 towers were planned, but only the Odeon was built. When liberation came around, Alderney was liberated well after V-E Day, and after the liberation of Jersey and Guernsey on May 9, 1945. Alderney was liberated on the 16th, and on the 20th, 2,332 German POWs were taken away from the island. Many of the German soldiers stationed at the Odeon, Fort Doyle, or Lager Sylt during the occupation enjoyed the island, and some even caught lobster, played football (soccer) on the Butes, and painted murals in the barracks and homes they were based in. The rations for the troops on the Odeon and other forts were cooked and prepared at Fort Tourgis before being shipped by way of cart to the forts on the island.

The Odeon became a National Trust-owned site when they came to the island in the 60s, along with many of the other Fortifications of Alderney. Currently, the tower is used as a small museum, housing information boards on all of its levels, as well as a telescope on one of the observation decks, where on a clear day France can be visible.
