= M19 Maschinengranatwerfer =

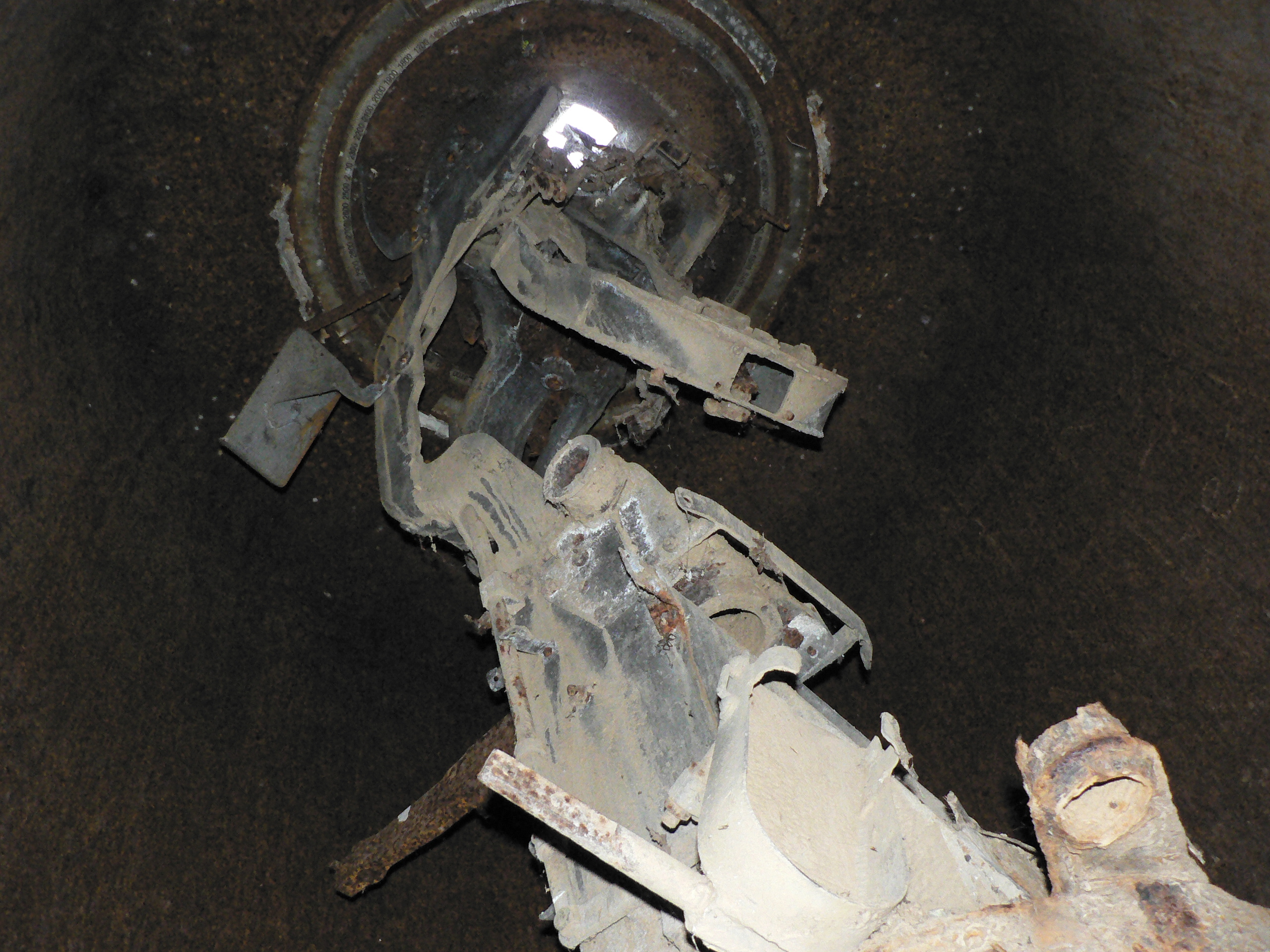
- The remnants of a M19 Maschinengranatwerfer in Festungsfront in Oder-Warthe fortress in Międzyrzecz, Poland.
- Type: Mortar
- Place of origin: Germany

Production history
- Designed: 1934
- Manufacturer: Rheinmetall-Borsig
- No. built: 150

Specifications
- Mass: 220 kg
- Shell weight: 0.9 kg
- Caliber: 50 mm
- Elevation: +48° to +87°
- Traverse: 360°
- Rate of fire: 60-120 rounds per minute
- Muzzle velocity: 44-83 m/s
- Maximum firing range: 50-750 m

The M-19 Maschinengranatwerfer is a German 50 mm mortar which was used during World War II. The mortar was developed in 1934 for the purpose of defending permanent military bases. It had a maximum rate of fire of 120 rounds per minute and a range of 750 metres.

== Design ==
Created by Rheinmetall-Borsig, it is a very heavy and complicated weapon system, with its barrel and base alone weighing 220 kg.

This automatic 5 cm mortar could fire a maximum of 120 bombs a minute, and was electrically operated with manual backup. The firing rate of 120 bombs/minute was seldom used as it caused much stress and wear on the construction. It was loaded with clips of six bombs by two crew members. Several other crew members prepared the clips. One gunner aimed and fired the weapon.

It is unknown how many units were built, but it is estimated that the number could hardly have been much more than 150. Some mounted in the West Wall (Westwall) in Germany were removed and positioned on the Atlantic Wall.

The idea was that the M19 mortar would be used in conjunction with machine guns, especially those mounted in armoured domes. The mortar was to fire into "dead zone" or "blind zone" areas that were out of range and direct sighting for the machine guns, such as low spots in the terrain and the far sides of hills and ridges. In this way enemy soldiers seeking cover from direct fire would be flushed out into the open, so that the machine guns could engage them. The 5 cm projectiles possessed small amount of high-explosive filler and generated only a small number of fragments. It required a significant number of rounds to have effect on troops in prone positions and seeking cover.

== R-633 bunker ==
The R-633 bunker was designed to protect the M19. Fewer than 100 R-633 were built. Where possible the entire construction was to be buried underground, leaving just the flat armoured opening on the roof to fire through. Access to the bunker was by way of a trench.

The automatic feeder for the mortar required a three-phase electricity supply to power the lift, otherwise ammunition had to be passed up. Earlier versions were manually fed using a flywheel. The bunker held 3,944 mortar rounds. A 24 V battery system provided lighting. Bulbs illuminated to show the rate of fire, 40, 60, 80 or 120 round per minute.

Each R-633 was built to the standard B strength, with 2 m thick walls and roof. If, as was standard, it was to be completely buried, 1,900 m^{3} had to be excavated. Each bunker required 845 m^{3} of concrete, 40 tonnes of steel rebar and 6.3 tonnes of other steel items. The weapon was installed in an armoured dome weighing 39 tonnes.

Two armoured turrets were designed:

- 34P8 Panzerturm für 5cm M19 Maschinengranatwerfer mit Schachtring B strength designed in 1935
- 49P8 Panzerturm für 5cm M19 Maschinengranatwerfer was A-1 strength designed in 1935

(The 34 and 49 refer to the type of design, the P stands for Panzer or armoured, the 8 is the sum of the last 2 digits of the year (3+5=8))

The R-633 had a crew of 14 men, half working with the mortar, the remainder providing local defence. A video of an exploration of an automatic mortar bunker can be found on YouTube at https://www.youtube.com/watch?v=-1mIVX2XOTk This is a relatively pristine example with the mortar itself in place along with the dome.

== M-19 locations ==
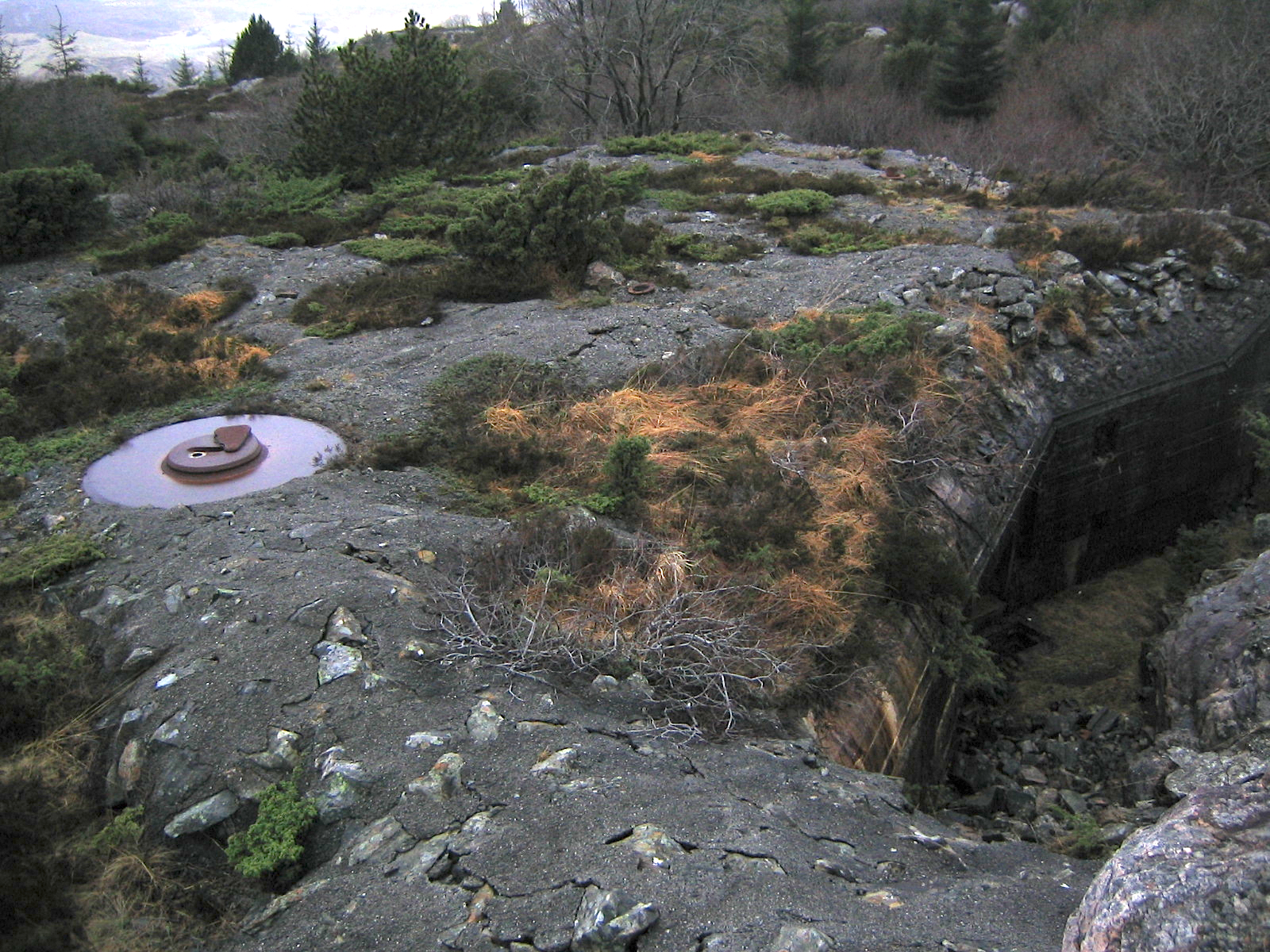
Fjell, Norway festning R633 M-19 Maschinengranatenwerfer

- Alderney - 2
  - Bonne Terre Valley (Widerstandsnest Mullerhof)
  - Longis Bay (Stützpunkt Steinbruch)
- Belgium
  - Harbour of Oostende - 2
- Denmark - 20
  - Stütspunkt Agger-Dorf (Mortar No 135 is on display at Hanstholm fortress)
  - Stütspunktgruppe Blaavand, Esbjerg
- France - 48
  - Saint-Nazaire submarine base (not in R633)
  - North of Utah Beach
  - Oye-Plage
  - Wn Lo25 Le Locmiquel, west of Lorient
  - Ra230 Fort de la Cite d'Aleth, Saint-Malo
- Germany - 32
  - B-Werke of the Westwall - 32
- Guernsey - 4
  - Chouet (Stützpunkt Krahennest)
  - Fort Hommet (Stützpunkt Rotenstein)
  - Fort Saumarez (Stützpunkt Langenberg)
  - Grandes Rocques Stützpunkt Großfels
- Jersey - 1
  - La Corbière (open to the public)
- Netherlands
  - Breskens
  - Kernwerk fortress (Forteiland) - 2
- Norway
  - Kristiansand S - 2
  - Fjell - 3
  - U-boot Bunker BRUNO, Bergen (installation on UBB never finished) - 1
  - Ørland - 1
  - Storfosna - 1
  - Kristiansund N - 2
  - Bodø - 1
  - Kirkenes - 1 (maybe 2)
- Poland
  - Ostwall defence line
  - Festung Oder warthe Bogen, Międzyrzecz with 49P8 turret with a 438P01 turret for observation - 2
