= Fort Houmet Herbé =

Fort in the Channel Islands

- Part of the Fortifications of Alderney
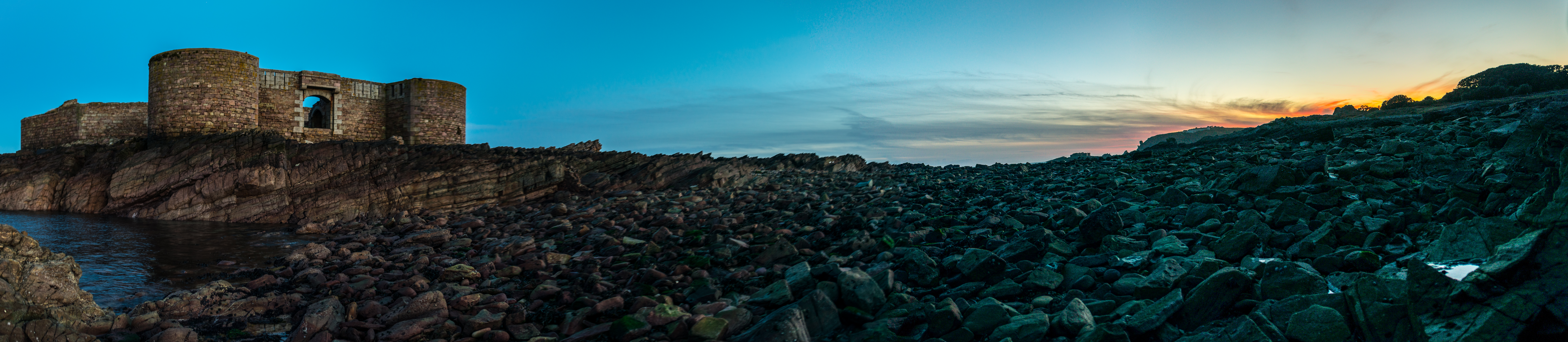
- Sunset over Fort Houmet Herbé

Site information
- Type: British coastal defence fortress

Location
- Location within Channel Islands
- Coordinates: 49.725836°N 2.157967°W

Fort Houmet Herbé is a fort on Alderney in the Channel Islands, northeast of Longis Bay. The location is notable for its geology, ecology, and wildlife.
