= Fort Saumarez =

British-German coastal fortification on Guernesey

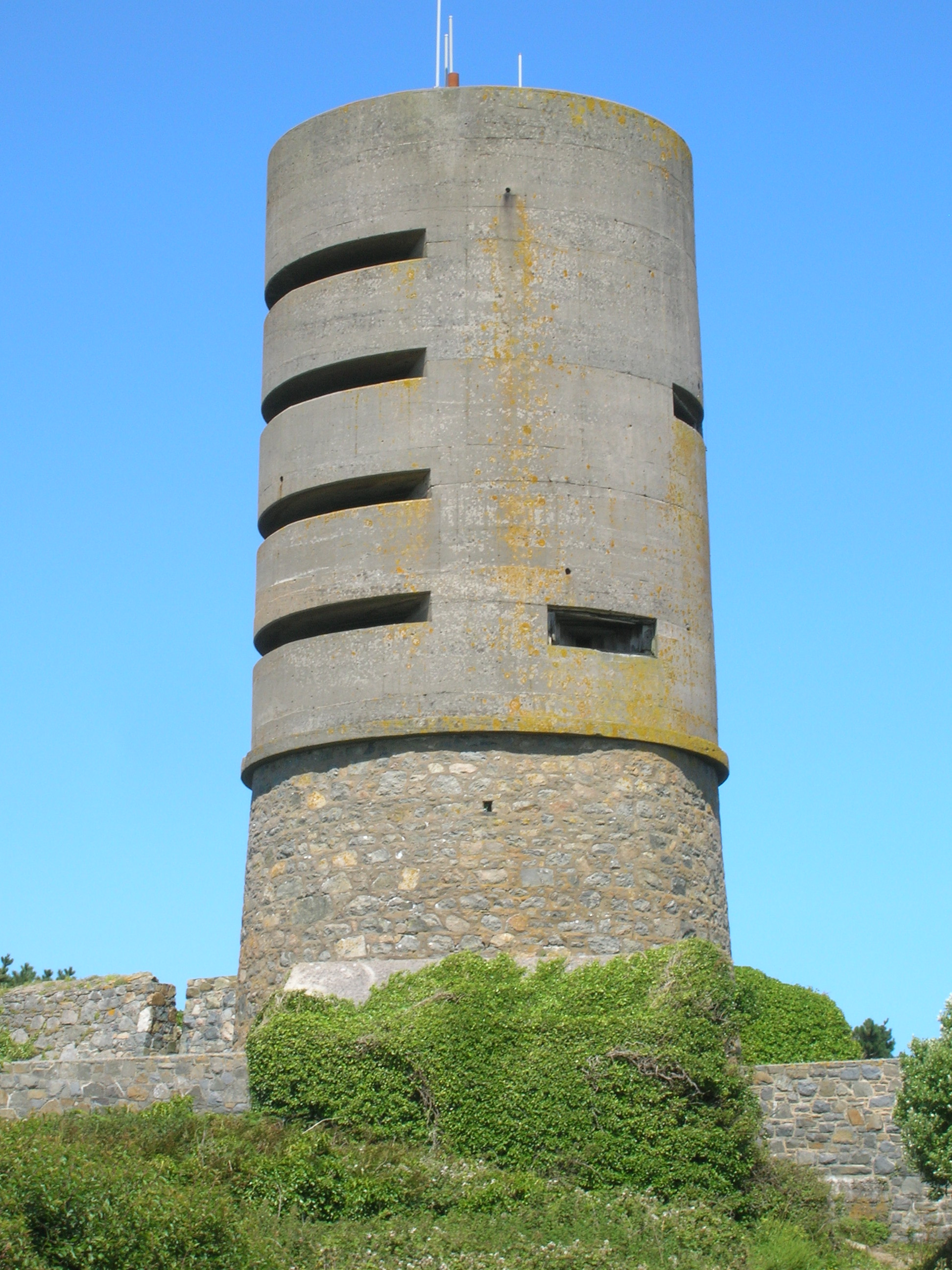
- Fort Saumarez

Site information
- Type: Martello tower

Location
- Shown within Channel Islands
- Location within Channel Islands
- Coordinates: 49.457542°N 2.655730°W

Site history
- Built: 1804

Fort Saumarez is a Martello tower in Saint Peter (Saint Pierre du Bois), Guernsey, on a headland that forms the northern tip of L'Erée and extends to the Lihou causeway.

== Martello tower ==
The Martello tower was constructed on the site of an existing battery in 1804 after the onset of the Napoleonic Wars and during the tenure (1803-1813) of Lieutenant Governor General Sir John Doyle. Doyle named the tower for the Guernsey native and renowned Royal Navy Captain, Sir James Saumarez, who at the time commanded British naval forces in the Channel Islands. To simplify matters, Doyle had a local builder named Gray construct the tower, and two others, see below, under the rubric of "fieldworks", thereby bypassing the Ordnance Corps.

The Fort Saumarez tower, like the other two Guernsey Martello towers, Fort Grey and Fort Hommet, was intended as a keep for the battery in which it was placed. The Guernsey Martellos are smaller than the British towers, with the Fort Saumarez and Fort Hommet towers being smaller than the Fort Grey tower. (Note: Forts Hommet and Saumarez have a diameter of 34 feet and stand 17 feet; Fort Grey has a diameter 36 feet and stands 26 feet high.) Each mounted a 24-pounder carronade on the roof to protect the battery. Fort Saumarez and Fort Hommet also have exterior staircases up to the second floor.

Doyle was responsible for substantial fortification efforts elsewhere in Guernsey, including the construction of the two other Martello towers. Because of its location, Fort Saumarez also served as one of six to ten optical telegraph stations that ringed the coast to give warning of approaching vessels.

In 1852, the battery at Fort Saumarez received 32-pounder guns and 8" shell guns in place of some of its 24-pounder guns.

== Stützpunkt Langenberg ==
During World War II and the German occupation of the Channel Islands, the Germans recognized the enduring utility of the site and built a four-storey concrete observation tower on top of the existing tower. At some point the battery around the Fort Saumarez tower was demolished. Fort Saumarez is now privately owned and not publicly accessible.

On the headland the Germans constructed:-

Facing north
a small casemate for a 4.7cm Festung Pak 36(t) anti tank gun and a 'jaeger' casemate for a 10.5cm K 331(f) coastal artillery gun. Above the 10.5cm casemate a shelter and operating position for a 60cm searchlight was located. Inside the hill a tunnel for diesel-powered electricity generators was dug with an entrance in the grounds of the house and a shaft up to the observation tower.

Facing west
A trench system was dug that includes a Tobruk (Ringstände) position for a captured French tank turret with 3.7 cm gun. At the seaward end of the trench system a small RFO bunker with 3/4/6-Schartenturm was emplaced. The trench and ringstand can be explored.

Inland
By the Creux es Faies dolmen, an R633 M19 automatic mortar bunker (buried) was built to cover the entire headland, and a 'garage' for a 5 cm Pak 38 built onto the eastern side covering the landfront. By the approach road an U-WaKoFest personnel bunker was built.

Facing south
Across the road from the U-WaKoFest is another operating position and buried bunker for a 60cm searchlight and a 'jaeger' casemate for a 10.5cm K 331(f). Further towards the Prosperity memorial carpark is a gunroom-only casemate for a 10.5cm K 331(f). Finally, a casemate for a 4.7 Festung Pak 36(t) anti tank gun is adjacent to the slipway at L'erée
