= Fort Ile de Raz =

Fort Ile De Raz
- Ile de Raz, Alderney

Site information
- Type: British coastal defence fortress
- Open to the public: no
- Condition: under renovation

Location
- Shown within Channel Islands
- Location within Channel Islands
- Coordinates: 49.7184811°N 2.1679491°W

Site history
- Battles/wars: None

Fort Ile de Raz is a fort on the small Ile de Raz, an islet off the coast of Alderney. The fort itself protects Longis Beach, a harbour on the island, Essex Castle, which served as a military hospital, and the site of the Nunnery, the first fortification on the island, left by the Romans.

Fort Ile de Raz is named after the Race, the strait between Alderney and France. It served as a bird museum and is currently under renovation.
