= Fort Hommet =

Fortification in Guernsey

Coordinates: 49.474°N 2.612°W

Site information
- Type: Martello tower

Fort Hommet (or Fort Houmet) is a fortification on Vazon Bay headland (or houmet in Guernésiais) in Castel, Guernsey. It is built on the site of fortifications that date back to 1680, and consists of a Martello tower from 1804, later additions during the Victorian Era, and bunkers and casemates that the Germans constructed during World War II.

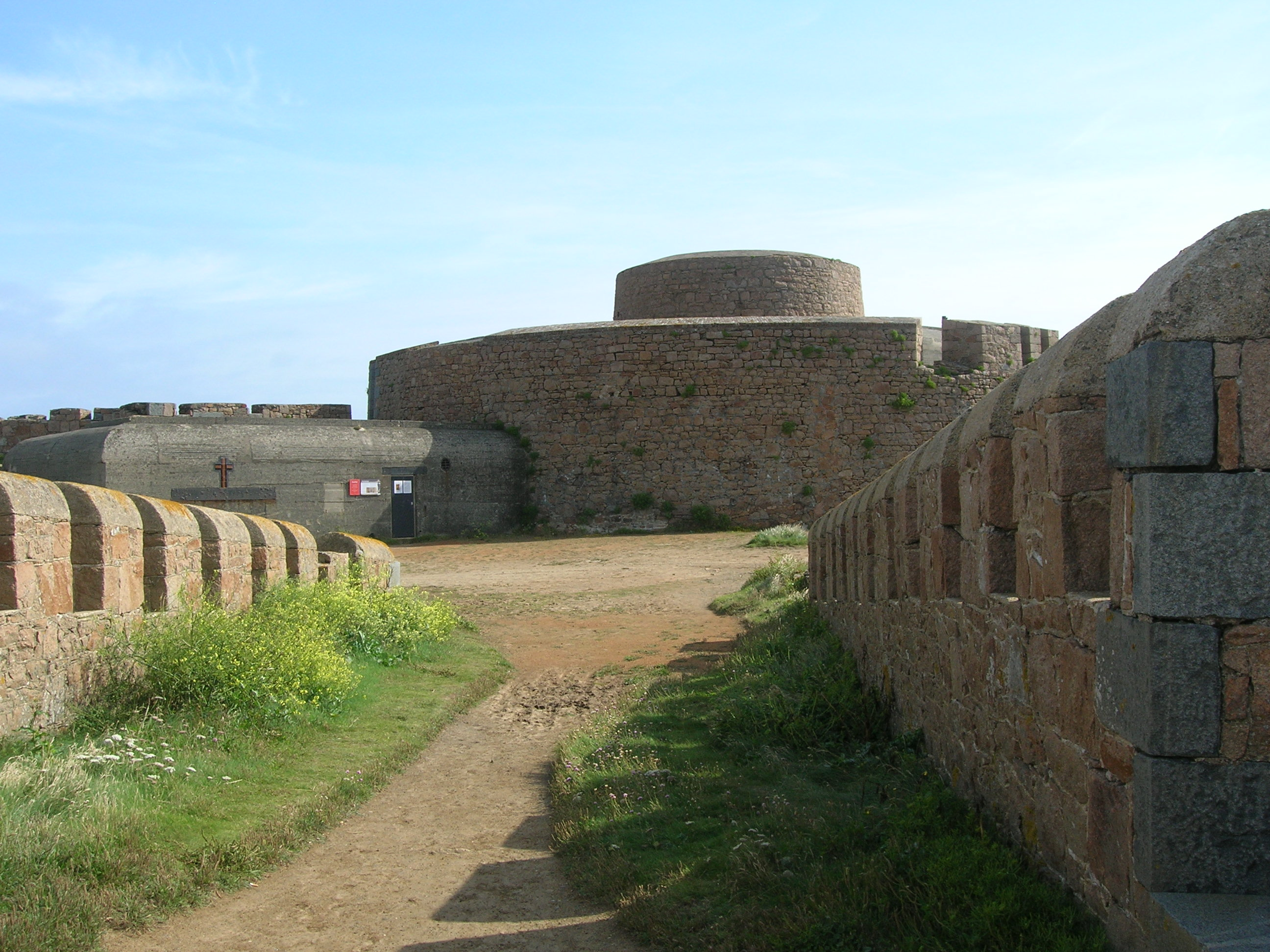
Fort Hommet, with Victorian and German accretions

== Early fortifications ==
In 1680, it is recorded that there was a fortification with one gun on the site. Following the French attempt to invade Jersey in 1781, improvements were made to island defences with Guernsey loophole towers being built, including the nearby one at Vazon. During 1795, the fortifications were improved on the headland with additional gun positions added. By 1805, six guns were recorded on the site. The connection between St Peter Port and the fort were improved with an upgrade of the road to military standard around 1808, using money deriving from the sale of land from the reclaimed Braye du Valle.

=== Martello Tower ===
The Martello tower was constructed in 1804, after the onset of the Napoleonic Wars, and during the tenure (1803-1813) of Lieutenant Governor General Sir John Doyle. To simplify matters, Doyle had a local builder named Gray construct the tower, and two others, under the rubric of "fieldworks", thereby bypassing the Ordnance Corps.

The Fort Hommet tower, like the other two Guernsey martello towers, Fort Grey and Fort Saumarez, was intended as a keep for the battery in which it was placed. The Guernsey martellos are all smaller than the British martello towers, with the Fort Saumarez and Fort Hommet towers being smaller than the Fort Grey tower. (Note: Forts Hommet and Saumarez have a diameter of 34 feet (10 m) and stand 17 feet (5.2 m); Fort Grey has a diameter 36 feet (11 m) and stands 26 feet (7.9 m) high.) Each mounted a 24-pounder carronade on the roof to support the battery. Fort Saumarez and Fort Hommet also have exterior staircases up to the second floor.

=== Victorian era ===
During the Victorian Era, the fort received additional batteries and barracks. In 1852, 68-pounder and 8" shell guns replaced some of the 24-pounder guns in the batteries.

The largest addition, however, occurred during World War II and the German occupation of the Channel Islands. The Germans recognized the enduring utility of the site and fortified it further, creating the Stützpunkt (Strongpoint) Rotenstein.

== Stützpunkt Rotenstein ==
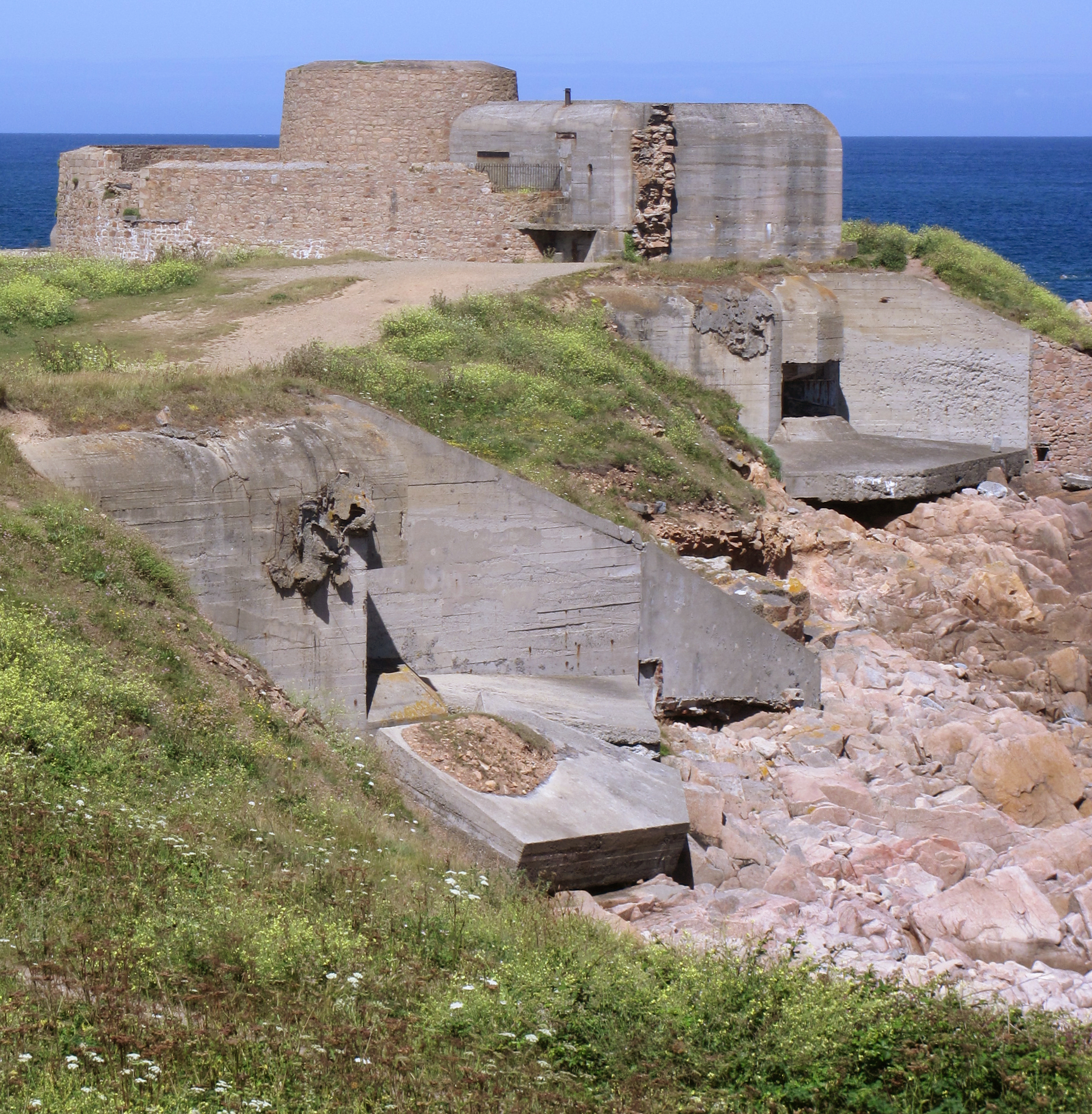
Stützpunkt Rotenstein, Fort Hommet

The whole of the headland was designated a strongpoint.

West of the Martello tower is a bunker that housed a multi-loopholed steel cupola. The Martello tower itself includes two bunkers that housed a 60cm and a 150cm searchlight, and crew accommodation. Facing north are two casemates housing 10.5cm K331(f) guns. Two similar casemates face south across Vazon beach including one now open as a museum. A Tobruk pit and a casemate for a 4.7cm Pak36(t) anti-tank gun complete the beach-facing defences. In the centre of the headland is a R633 bunker that housed a 5cm M19 automatic mortar. A reinforced field order emplacement, a fortress-quality personnel shelter, a minefield, field positions with trenches and machine gun pits, including a coaxial ball mounted MG 37(t), flamethrowers, and barbed wire completed the strongpoint's defences.

Minefield No 27, comprising 417 S-mines, 464 Teller mines, and 624 captured British mines protected the headland.

== Post-war ==
After the liberation of Guernsey in 1945, the British Army and the islanders stripped the fortifications. By the late 1940s, all the metal fittings, including guns and blast doors, had been removed for scrap. Many of the bunkers, including the gun-casemate at Fort Hommet, were buried in an attempt to return the coastal landscape to its pre-war condition.

More recently, the States of Guernsey has restored parts of the fort, and particularly the Fort Hommet 10.5 cm Coastal Defence Gun Casement Bunker. This is now open to visitors, though with restrictive hours. The M19 Maschinengranatwerfer bunker has also been renovated.

== Protection ==
The whole of Fort Hommet and associated structures and the whole of the German fortifications within the Fort Hommet headland was listed as a Protected Monument on 2 November 1990, reference PM137.
