= Fortifications of Alderney =

Victorian-era forts built to defend Alderney from the French

Apart from a Roman Fort, there were very few fortifications in Alderney until the mid 19th century. These forts were then modified and updated in the mid-20th century by Nazi Germany during the occupation period. Alderney at 8 km^{2} (3.1 sq mi) is now one of the most fortified places in the world.

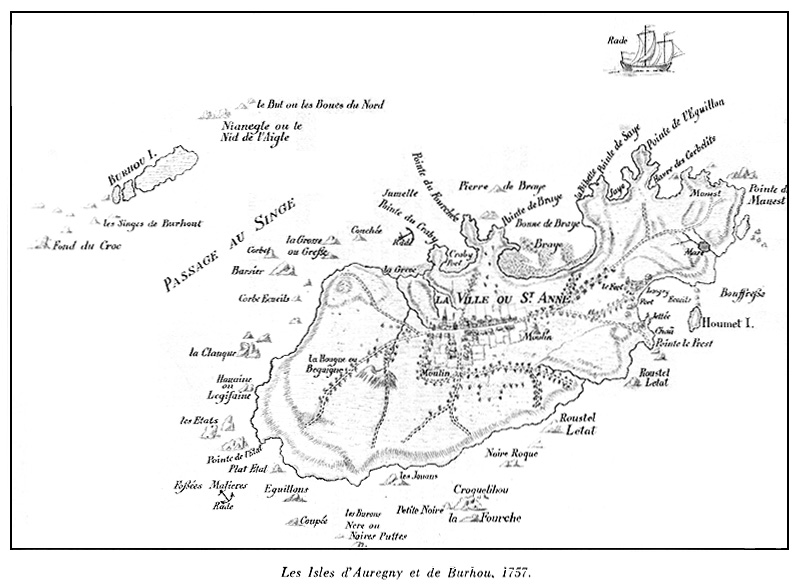
Map of Alderney in 1757

== List of fortifications ==
- The Gannets
- “The Guns” Gun Emplacement
- Fort Clonque
- Fort Tourgis
- Fort Platte Saline
- Fort Doyle
- Fort Grosnez
- Mount Hale Battery
- Fort Albert
- Fort Chateau A L’Etoc
- Fort Corblets
- The Odeon
- Fort Les Hommeaux Florains
- Fort Quesnard
- Fort Houmet Herbé
- Fort Ile de Raz
- The Nunnery
- Essex Castle

== Early period ==
=== The Nunnery, 350 AD ===
Current evidence indicates that the Nunnery originated as a Roman fortification, 40 square metres (430 sq ft) with rounded corners where bastions were built. Built of stone and Roman concrete, the south, west and north curtain walls are still standing. Parts of the east, north and south walls remain of the tall tower that stood inside the walls. There is close similarity in plan to Roman signal stations built in Yorkshire, which were slightly smaller.

=== Essex Castle, 1550s ===
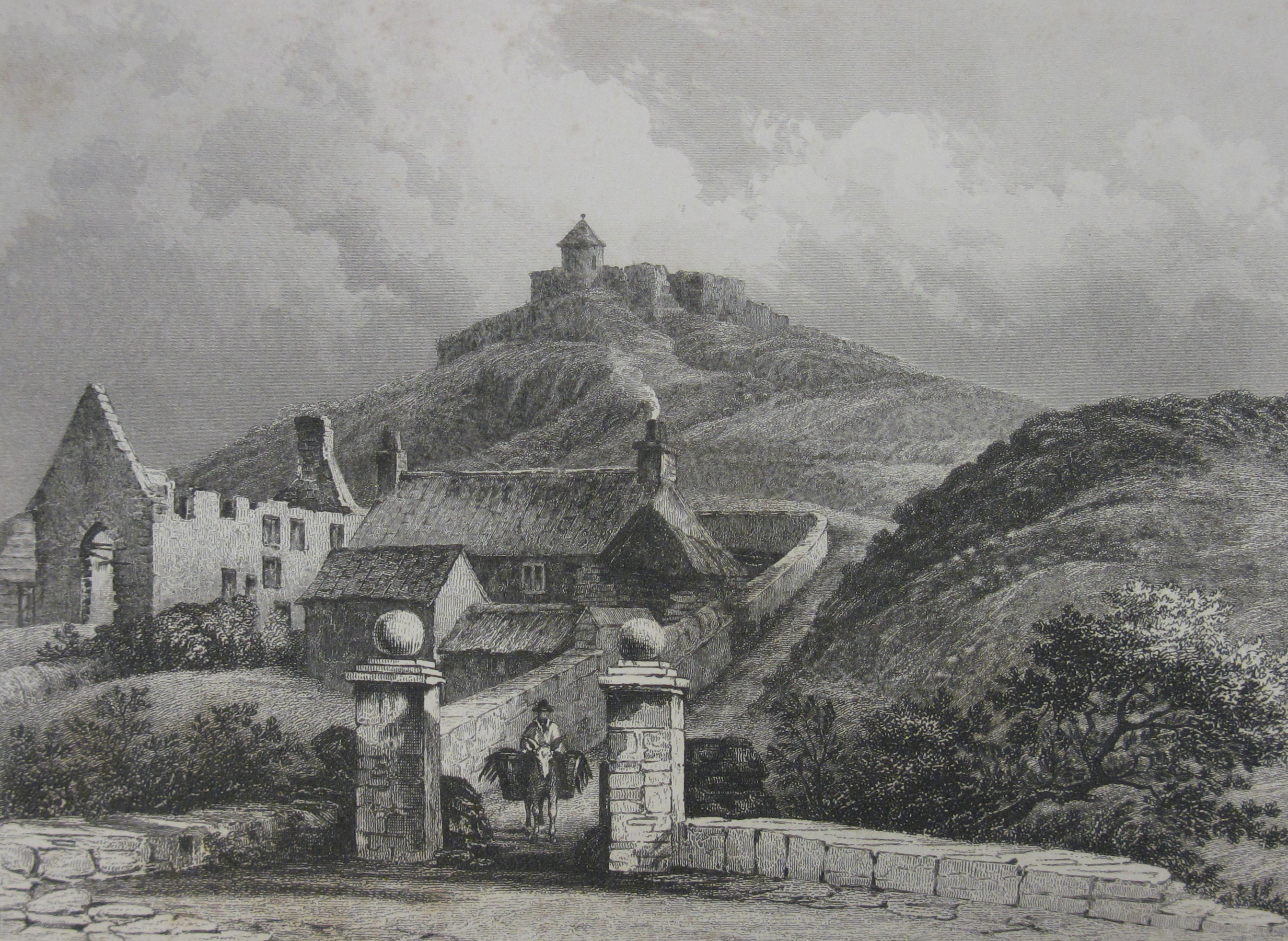
Ruined Essex Castle in 1840

In 1556, at the end of the reign of Henry VIII, work began on building a fortification on the site that would become known as Essex Castle. The only remains of the fortification are the current north and west walls. 200 men worked to provide facilities for a garrison of 200 soldiers. The capture of Sark by the French in 1549 ensured the work would continue, and additional funding was obtained. However, when Queen Mary came to the throne in 1553, the work was abandoned and dismantled, and it was converted to a private residence for John Chamberlayne, the Lord of Alderney 1584–91. There followed a period when the island was attacked by pirates or used by pirates, as it was undefended.

=== Militia, 1337-1840 ===
The Island militia may have existed for centuries, as did the militias of Guernsey and Jersey. In 1337, King Edward III of England authorised Thomas de Ferres to “levy and train” militias in Guernsey, Jersey, Sark and Alderney, to the use of arms and to "aray them in thousands, hundreds and twenties". The first mention of a militia commander, Captain Nicholas Ling, was in the records in 1657. Without fortifications apart from a decaying Essex Castle and the Nunnery, and with few if any cannon, the island was not defendable.

During the Seven Years' War in 1756 the Militia amounted to 200 men, and the island became a centre for privateers. In 1781 France invaded Jersey, resulting in the Battle of Jersey. In 1793, the fear of the French Revolution resulted in 200 soldiers, together with trained artillerymen, being sent to Alderney. The loss of HMS Amethyst, a 38-gun frigate wrecked in 1795 off Alderney, gave the island a number of cannon rescued from the wreck, and batteries were built for them. By 1809 there were nineteen batteries holding 93 cannon. Barracks had also been built to house 568 men, and the militia totalled 384 men. A telegraph tower was constructed above La Foulère in 1811, enabling signals to be relayed visually to Le Mât in Sark and on to Guernsey: early warning of attack during the Napoleonic Wars was of strategic importance.

On the 50th anniversary of the Battle of Jersey, in 1831, the Alderney Militia, now reduced to 65 gunners and 98 infantry, was awarded the epithet of "Royal", as had the Jersey and Guernsey Militias. The militia continued until after World War I.

== Victorian era fortifications ==
Concerns by the Commander-in-Chief of the Forces, Arthur Wellesley, 1st Duke of Wellington, over France and the expansion of their harbour at Cherbourg resulted in a commission in 1842 to look at the problem. A recommendation to build harbours at St Catherine's in Jersey and in Alderney was approved in 1845, to be called "Harbours of Refuge" to avoid upsetting the French. A massive breakwater to enclose between 67 acres (27 ha) and 150 acres (61 ha) in Braye bay, dependent upon the date of the plan between 1845 and 1859. The idea of building just a harbour would provide the enemy with a good facility that once taken could not be recovered. It required fortifications to defend the harbour. Following the construction of the railway line from the quarry to the harbour and the importation of two engines, the northern breakwater was begun. Given the misleading title of a harbour of refuge so as not to provoke the French, it was constructed by Jackson and Bean between 1847 and September 1864 when it had reached 1,500 m (4,900 ft) when works were abandoned.

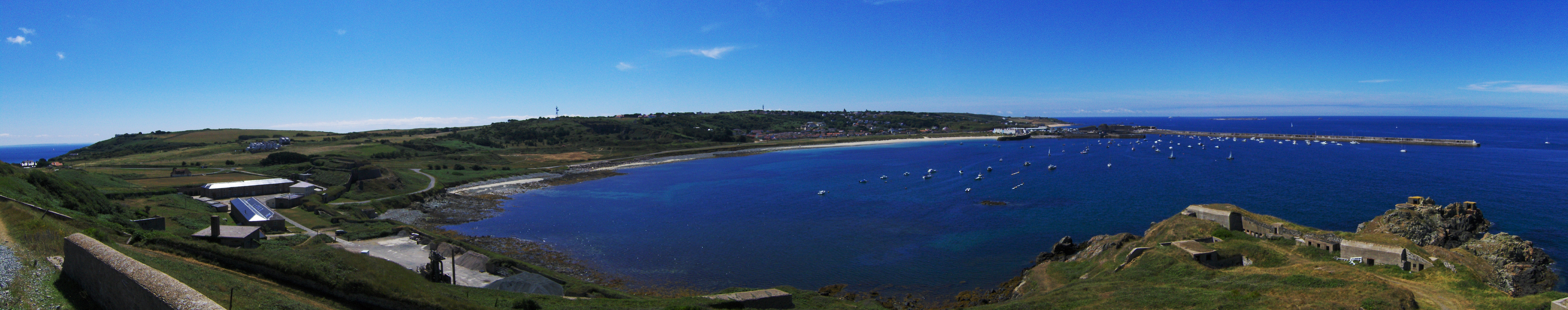
Panorama of Braye Harbour, with Fort Albert on the right and Fort Grosnez on the left.

=== Construction ===
The French coup d'état in 1851, followed by the crowning of Prince Napoleon as Emperor Napoleon III in 1852, prompted the start of the defensive works. Captain William F.D. Jervois, Corps of Royal Engineers, was appointed. He not only supervised the works but insisted on agreeing every detail, between 1852 and January 1855, assisted by the 11th Company of Sappers and Miners. He would return to Alderney on occasions.

There were three royal visits to Alderney by Queen Victoria and Prince Albert to Alderney. The first was on 8/9 August 1854, when the royal couple rode on an Alderney Railway car under a striped silk canopy, pulled by two black horses to the quarry before returning. Captain Jervois was promoted to a brevet Major after the visit. The second visit was on 19 August 1857, and the third in 1859 to inspect the works.

==== Fort Clonque ====
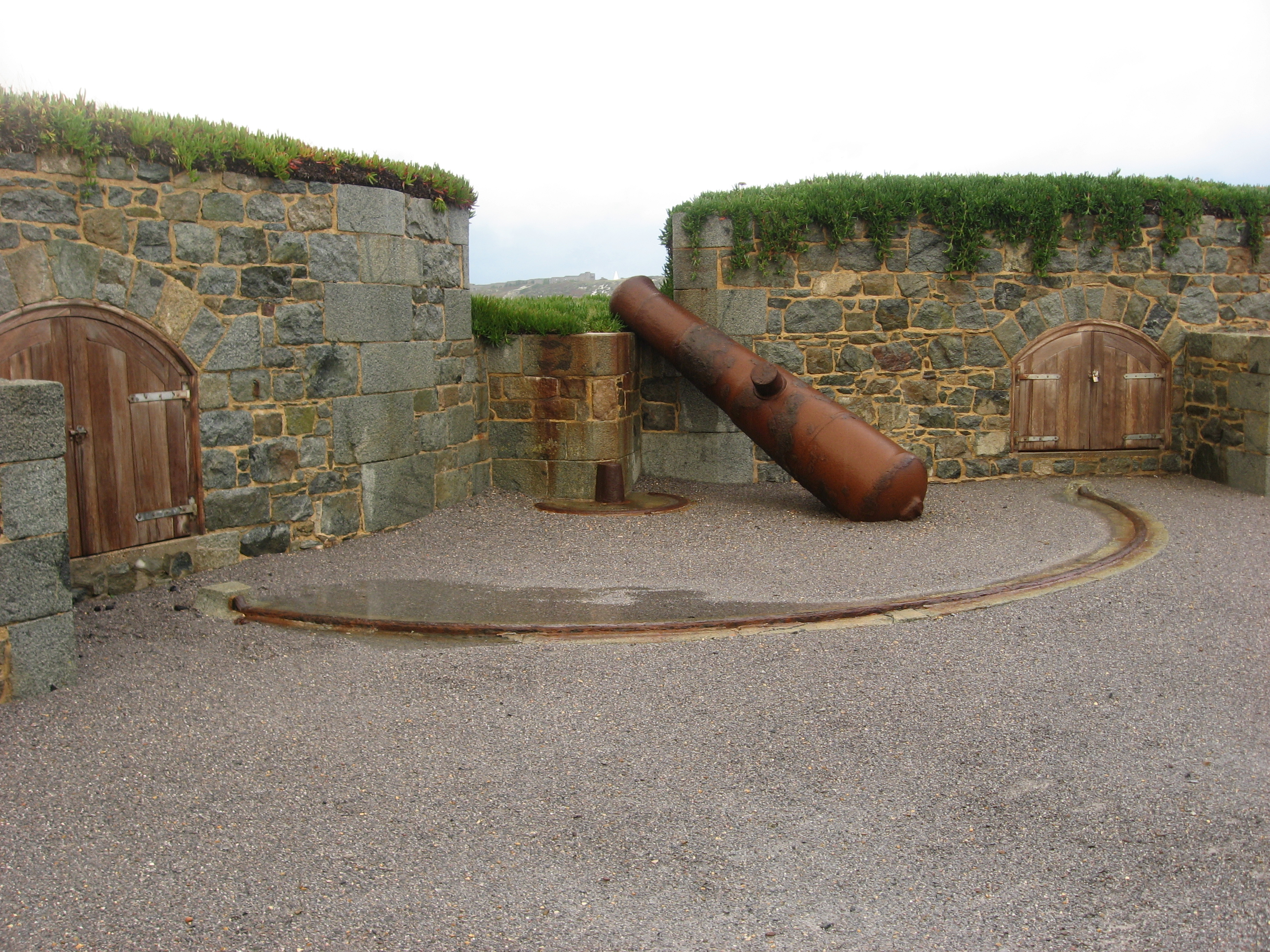
Fort Clonque cannon

Completed in 1855 on an islet, Fort Clonque, the most westerly in Alderney, connected by a causeway, mounting ten guns with a crew of 59 and bomb proof buildings. Originally the barracks were on the shore, making it impossible to get to the fort to man the guns at high tide. Decommissioned in 1929, and sold by the Crown for £27.

==== Fort Tourgis ====
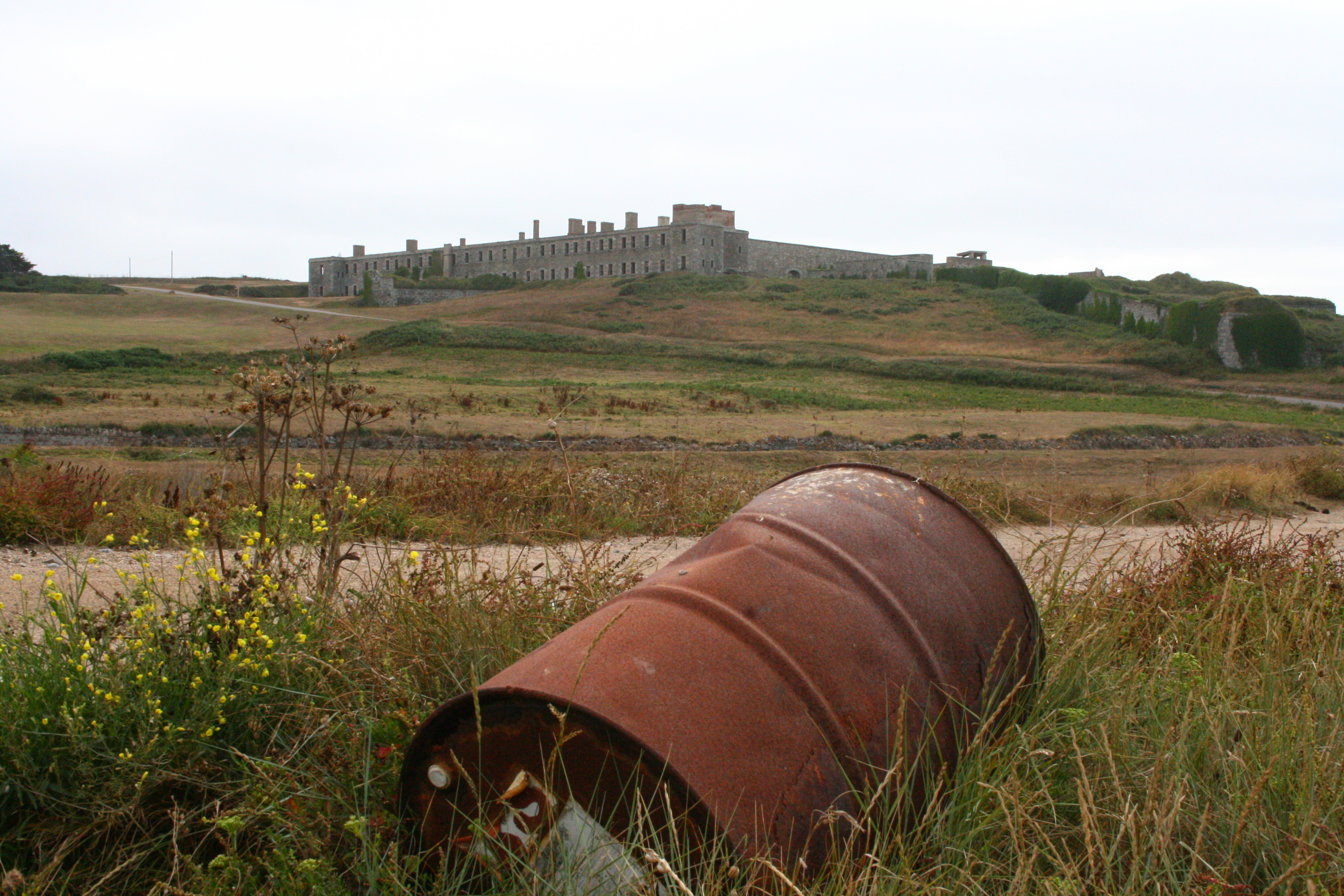
Fort Tourgis

Fort Tourgis, also completed in 1855, the second largest fort on the Island, mounting 33 guns in five batteries requiring 346 men. Sufficient accommodation was available in the fort. Built on a headland covering the bays of Clonque and Plattes Saline with many loopholed walls. Along the second beach, two batteries were built: Platte Saline and Doyle with three and four guns. Used by the Alderney militia until it was disbanded in 1882 and by the militia artillery until 1929.

==== Fort Grosnez ====
At the base of the breakwater. Authorised in 1850 and constructed from 1851 to 1853. It contains 28 guns in seven batteries. In the bay, Braye Battery was built for 9 guns. Manned by the Royal Garrison Artillery.

==== Fort Albert ====
Originally named Fort Touraille and planned as a battery, it was renamed after the death of Prince Albert in 1861. The fort was built on Braye bay eastern headland between 1856 and 1859; it had 43 guns with barracks for 424. Roselle Battery, also on the headland with seven guns, was completed in 1854. Around 1900, the fort was modified, reducing the number of guns and fitting two 6-inch BL guns, which changed the fort's appearance. The fort was the island's military headquarters, housing a regular army garrison until 1929.

==== Fort Château L'Etoc ====
Built on a narrow headland projecting into the sea, completed in 1855, designed for 23 guns with accommodation for 128. Designed to be the protection for the eastern arm of the breakwater that was never built. Built on a stone age burial site; a Guernsey archaeologist was distraught at the way the construction labourers threw the bones and artefacts over the cliff into the sea.

==== Eastern forts ====
- Fort Corblets – Thirteen guns in four batteries manned by 59 men.
- Fort Les Hommeaux Florains – on a small Island with five guns.
- Fort Quesnard – seven guns with 55 men.
- Fort Houmet Herbé – built on an island, with five guns on four towers.
- Fort Ile de Raz – reached by a causeway, 10 guns manned by 64 men.
- Longis Lines – battery of 14 guns.
- Essex barracks – built in original Fort Essex.

=== Redundant ===
The Crimean War of 1853–56 saw the former enemy, France, fighting alongside the British army. Alliances were changing.

The rising cost of the breakwater construction, in 1864 it stood at £1,600,000 (equivalent to £176,000,000 in 2025) and storms that had severely damaged the breakwater, resulted in works being stopped. This left the harbour exposed to easterly gales. Half of the breakwater was abandoned. The lack of commercial and navy shipping wanting to use the harbour, combined with the increase in the size of navy ships, and improvements in the power of artillery added to political changes including the crushing defeat of France in the 1870-71 Franco-Prussian War made the harbour and its fortifications redundant. The forts had cost £250,000 and needed 7,000 soldiers to man them.

== German fortifications ==
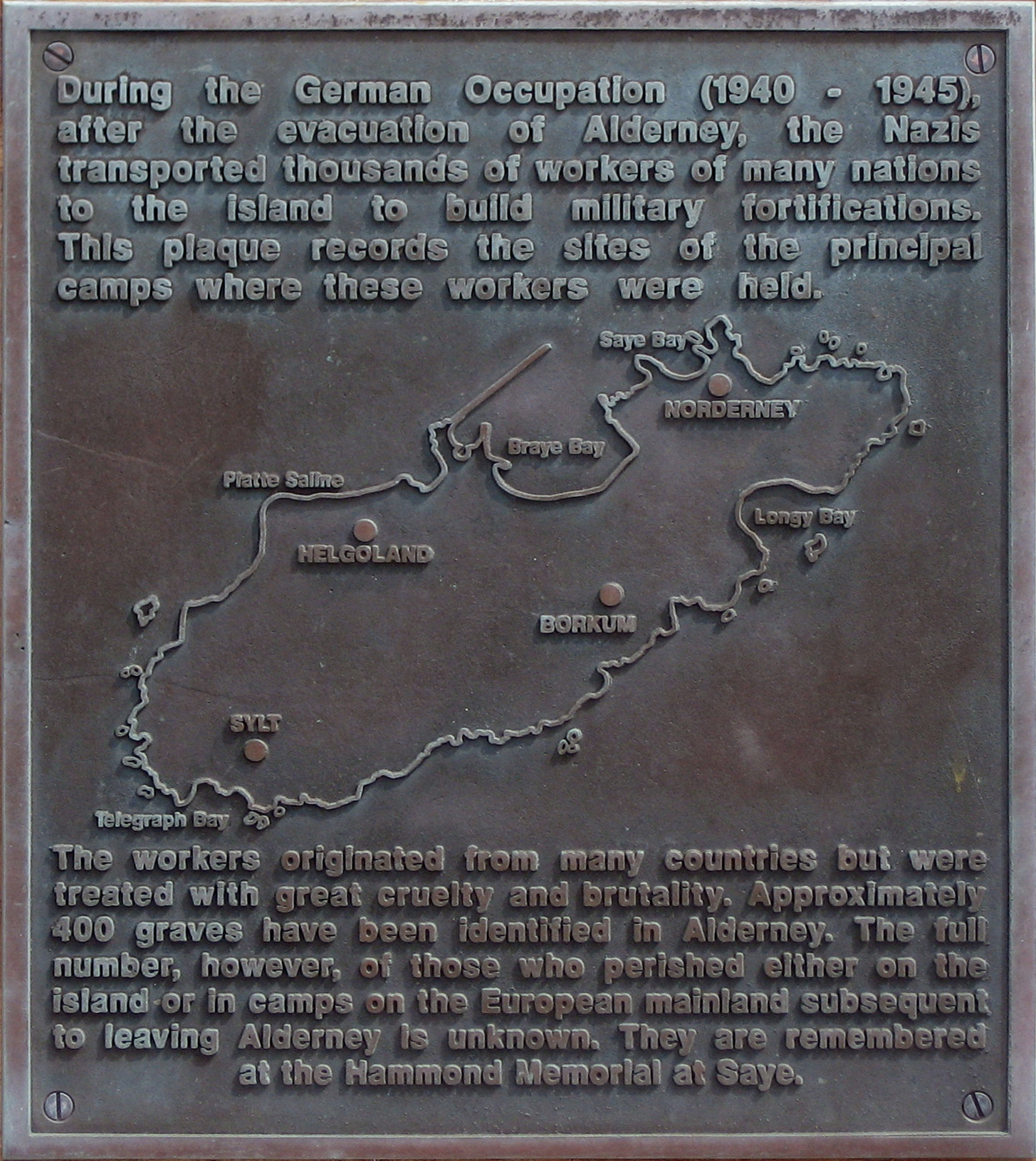
Memorial - Konzentrationslager

Arriving in an almost deserted island in 1940, all but 18 of the population having evacuated to England, the 450 Germans manned the existing fortifications until 1941 when Hitler decided to fortify the Channel Islands. The majority of the work was given to the Organisation Todt (OT), and Fritz Todt visited the islands personally to inspect the plans for the proposed works designed by the fortress engineers before they were agreed by Hitler on 20 October. The OT gave the code name Adolf to Alderney. The garrison from all three services would rise to 3,200 by 1944.

Workers were brought to the island and installed in camps. By January 1942, the four camps held 6,000 workers. Two of the camps held "volunteer" workers, Borkum holding German and other European skilled workers and Helgoland Russian volunteers.

Camp Sylt held Jews, who were treated as slaves, and camp Norderney held forced labour: mainly Russian and Polish POWs, but including men of many other nationalities. The camps were run by the OT until the SS took them over in March 1943. Those that survived the harsh treatment were shipped back to France to work on the Atlantic Wall when that became a higher priority. There are 397 known graves in Alderney, and about 200 died when two German minesweepers were sunk by two Allied destroyers on 7/8 July 1944.

=== Artillery ===
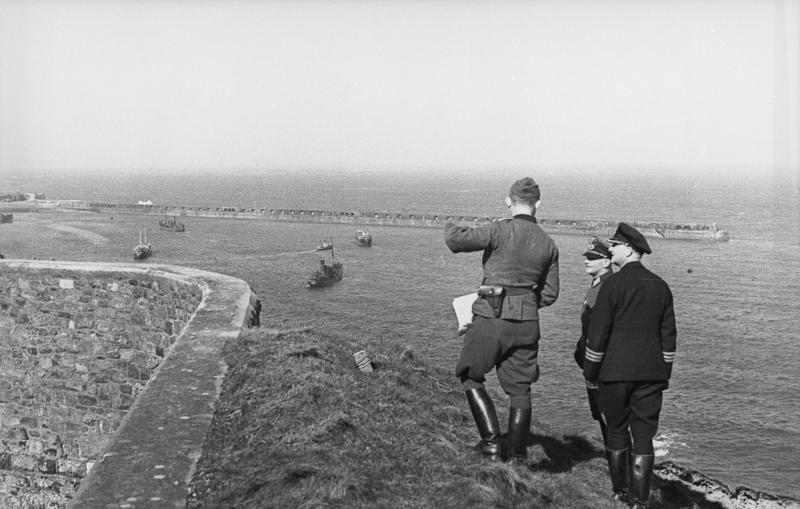
Germans inspecting harbour from Fort Albert

Using the Island as a fixed gun platform, large artillery guns would be capable of interlinking with guns on the Cherbourg peninsula and Guernsey to deny the area to the British Navy.

Five batteries were established:

- Elsass – 3 × 17cm SK L/40 in naval shielded open emplacements with 22 kilometres (14 mi) range in Fort Albert
- Annes – 4 × 15 cm SK C/28 naval turreted in open emplacements with 22 kilometres (14 mi) range on the western end of the island
- Blücher – 4 × 15cm K18 in open emplacements with 24 kilometres (15 mi) range in centre
- Marcks – 4 × 10.5cm K331(f) in casemates on Roselle battery site
- Falke – 4 × 10cm leFH 14/19(t) in open field positions in the centre

All but Battery Marcks having 360 degrees angles of fire and were controlled from the Naval Direction Tower (known as MP3 or Marine Peilstand 3) at Mannez quarry using Freya radar and optical observation. This was the only tower built of the six that were planned.

In June 1944 Battery Blücher opened fire on American troops on the Cherbourg peninsula who were attacking Cherbourg. HMS Rodney was called up on 12 August to fire at the battery. Using a Spitfire aircraft as a spotter, it fired 72 sixteen-inch (406 mm) shells at a range of 40 kilometres (25 mi). Forty shells landed within 200 metres (660 ft) of the target. Two Germans were killed, and several injured with two of the four guns damaged. Three guns were back in action in August, the fourth by November.

=== Anti aircraft ===
Four 8.8cm Flak batteries supported by three 3.7cm Flak batteries and numerous 2cm Flak guns for close support.

The 8.8cm batteries, generally with six guns in open-topped concrete emplacements, being controlled with mobile Würzburg radar that had a range of 40 kilometres (25 mi). Flak Battery Hohe 145 located next to the MP3 tower comprising a command post, radar position, 3 × 2 cm and 8 × 8.8 cm emplacements. With ammunition bunkers, personnel bunkers and the normal smaller defensive facilities.

Anti aircraft landing obstacles were erected in many parts of the Island to hinder any glider landings.

A Boeing B-17 Flying Fortress Idiot’s Delight was shot down by Alderney batteries on 19 June 1944 and ditched in the sea. There was only one survivor.

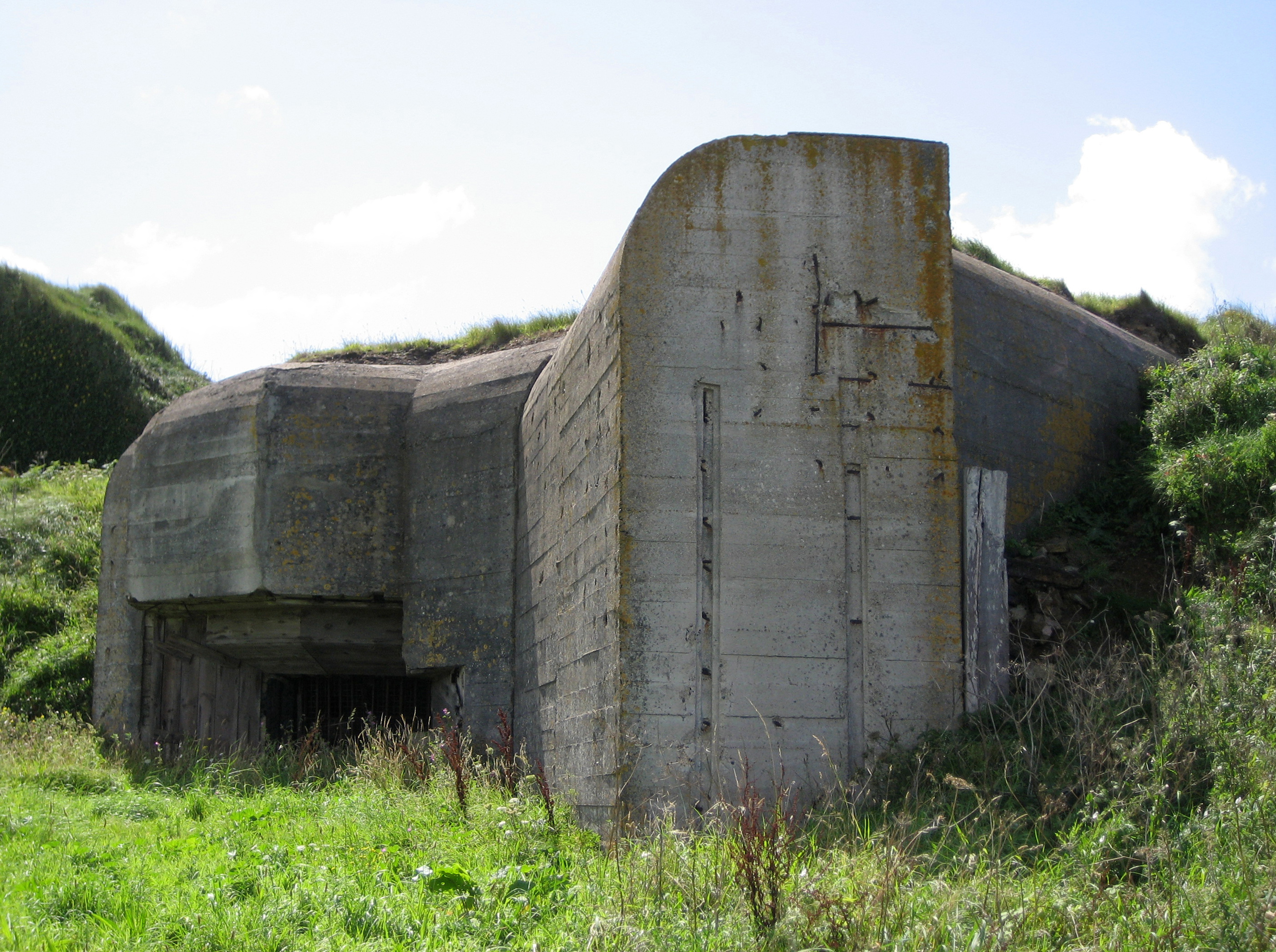
Casemate

=== Coastal defences ===
Sixteen 10.5cm K331(f) guns of which nine were in casemates were located in suitable positions to defend approaches to beaches. Often using existing forts such as Fort Raz with 2x10.5 cm. A number of anti tank guns in casemates covered the beaches. 60 cm and 150cm Searchlights were located where necessary.

An anti tank wall at SP Steinbruch at Longis Bay at the top of the beach with anti landing craft obstacles, some mined, in the sea and on the sand.

Roll bombs made from large calibre French shells with a long wire attached to the detonator, were located on top of cliffs. Rolled over the edge they would fall until the wire pulled the detonator.

Barbed wire, machine gun pits, anti tank obstacles, small air raid shelters and anti personnel mines, in total 30,325 mines were laid.

=== Defensive areas ===
Thirteen Stützpunkt (Strongpoints) (SP), more than in Guernsey and many smaller Widerstandsnest (Resistance nests) (WN). Many of the Victorian forts were converted into SPs or WNs.

Each defence area comprised zigzag trenches, machine gun posts, weapons pits, barbed wire, minefields and if appropriate had Tobruk pits, personnel bunkers, fixed location flame throwers that were fired remotely, mortars, armoured machine gun tank turret, 3.7 cm Pak 35/36, 4.7 cm Pak K 36(t) or 5 cm Pak 38 anti tank gun, coastal gun. Concrete bunkers and casemates as well as open positions.

Fifteen light Renault tanks were located at three parks in the Island as a mobile reserve.

=== Tunnels ===
Numerous tunnels were excavated as shelters and to store ammunition and food. A few were completed, some abandoned. Few were lined with concrete before materials became scarce and the workers left the Island.

=== Specialist facilities ===
Command bunkers, a hospital bunker off Longis road, generator bunkers, water bunker, water tower in St Anne, telephone switching bunker and wireless communications bunker.

=== Camouflage ===
An important element of defence, great care was taken to disguise fortifications from aerial observation using granite, earth, vegetation, paint, wire mesh sprayed with concrete, nets and dummy structures. Regular Allied observation flights took photographs of the Island from high and medium levels as works were being constructed, identifying most large objects, but misinterpreting a number of them. Many infantry positions were not identified.

== Surviving fortifications ==
Many of the Victorian fortifications survive, as do many German ones in a demilitarised form, having been stripped of metal in a scrap metal drive after World War II. Earthwork field fortifications and trenches have been filled in, and a few concrete emplacements buried.

The majority of fortifications are on private land, with some converted to private accommodation and are therefore not accessible to the public. German fortifications along beaches may be on public land and may be open for access; however great care should be taken. Tunnels are generally very dangerous and should not be entered. Bunker parties are a feature of Alderney life.

The breakwater is not as long as in 1863: part of it has been abandoned as it suffers from the strong tides and winter storms which have washed away some of the protecting stonework. It requires a high annual maintenance bill to keep it intact, with the current cost of maintenance being paid for by Guernsey.

== See also ==
- German occupation of the Channel Islands
- Alderney camps
- Fortifications of Guernsey

== External ==
- Fort Clonque
- Fort Corblets
- Photos of Alderney Victorian forts
