= Fort Doyle (Guernsey) =

Coastal defence fort in Guernsey

- Vale, Guernsey

Site information
- Type: British coastal defense fortress, German resistance nest
- Open to the public: yes

Location
- Shown within Channel Islands
- Coordinates: 49.5059°N 2.5054°W

Site history
- Battles/wars: None
- Events: German occupation of the Channel Islands

Fort Doyle, also called Doyle's Battery, is a coastal fortification located at Fontenelle Bay on the northern shore of Guernsey, situated near Beaucette Marina, in the parish of Vale.

== History ==
Fort Doyle was constructed in 1803 by the States of Guernsey during the tenure of Lieutenant-Governor Major-General Sir John Doyle, after whom it was named. Its purpose was to strengthen the island's northern defences during the Napoleonic Wars, when the threat of French invasion was considered significant. The original battery was armed with three 18-pounder smoothbore cannons, one fixed on a northern platform and two mounted on traversable carriages to cover approaches from both east and west.

In 1855, the fort was enlarged and modernised, with improvements including the addition of a drawbridge. Over time, its role shifted from active defence to a support position, serving as a backup signal station and storage facility for equipment linked to the Platte Fougère lighthouse, which was completed in 1909.

== German occupation and abandonment ==
During the German occupation of the Channel Islands in World War II, Fort Doyle was integrated into the Atlantic Wall defences. The occupying forces fortified the site with reinforced concrete bunkers, gun emplacements, and mortar pits, and it was re-armed with coastal artillery and anti-aircraft weapons. The Germans designated the position “Stützpunkt Nebelhorn” (“Fog Horn Post”) and used it to guard the approaches to Guernsey's northeast coast.

Following the liberation of Guernsey in 1945, the site fell into disuse. Today, the surviving structures remain accessible to the public.

Fort Doyle survives in a semi-ruined but recognisable condition, with sections of the original stonework and later German fortifications still visible. The site is freely accessible to the public and is a popular stopping point on walking routes along Guernsey's northern coastline. Informal paths lead through the remains of the gun platforms, parapets, and bunkers.

No formal visitor centre exists at the fort, but interpretive signage provides basic historical information about its 19th-century origins and Second World War role.
