= Fort Clonque =

Fort in Alderney

- Part of Fortifications of Alderney
- Alderney
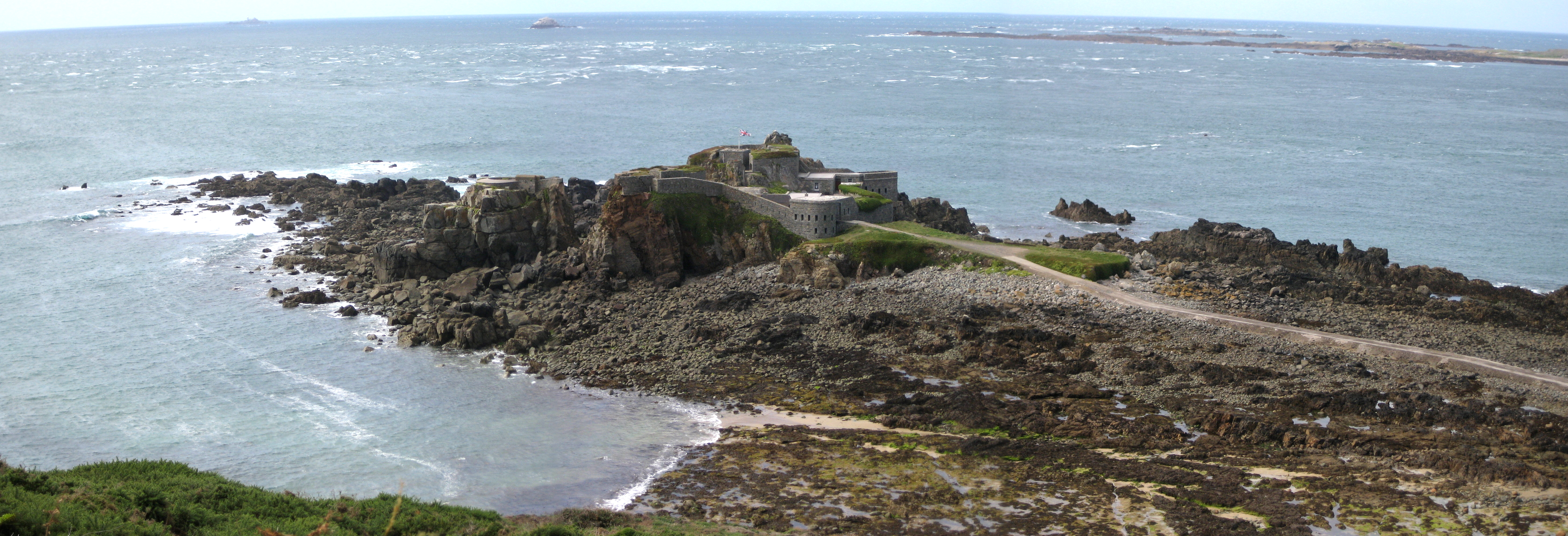
- Fort Clonque at low tide

Site information
- Type: British coastal defence fortress
- Owner: Landmark Trust
- Open to the public: Yes
- Condition: good

Location
- Shown within Channel Islands
- Coordinates: 49.7138°N 2.2330°W

Site history
- Events: German occupation of the Channel Islands

Fort Clonque is a 19th-century coastal fortress in Alderney, in the Bailiwick of Guernsey in the Channel Islands built on a rocky outcrop of land joined to the island by a causeway that can be submerged at high tide. It was constructed at a time when French naval power was becoming an increasing concern to the British. It was manned by fifty-five men and fortified with up to ten guns, mostly 68-pounders; however, none were ever fired in anger.

== History ==
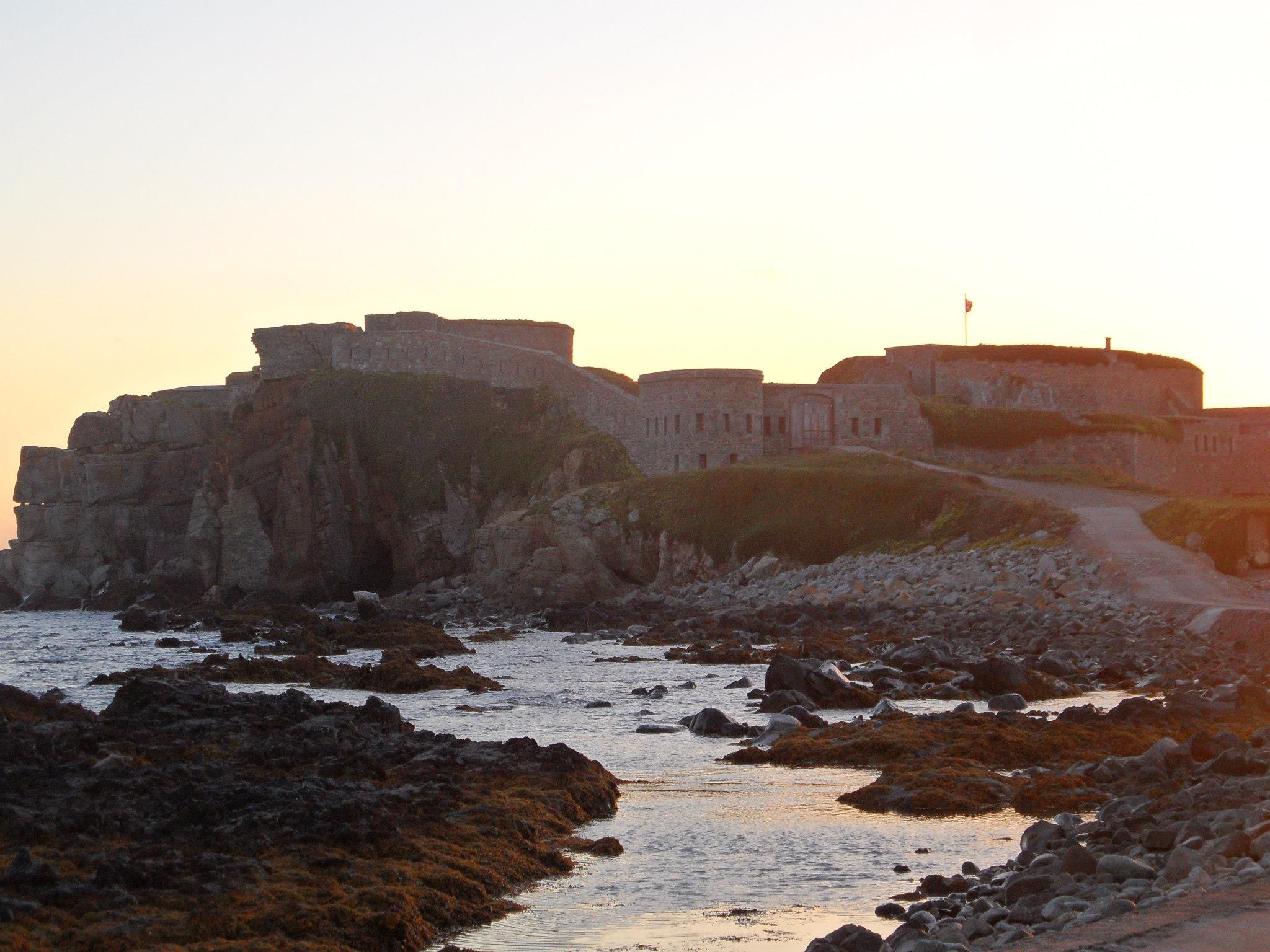
Fort Clonque in 2012

Fort Clonque was built by the British government as a response to the increasing power of the French navy and the expansion of the French port Cherbourg near the Channel Islands. The fort was constructed on a rocky outcrop of land on a small islet west of Alderney in the Bailiwick of Guernsey between 1853 and 1855. It was constructed by Captain William Jervois to protect the western side of Alderney and was fortified with fifty-five men and two officers with ten guns. At high tide, the fort is completely submerged and cut off from the rest of the island.

The fort was decommissioned in 1929. A year later it went up for auction and was purchased by businessman Ralph Duplain for £27.

Due to its strategic location, German forces occupied the fort during the German occupation of the Channel Islands in World War II. The Germans upgraded the fort and added modern gun positions.

Scenes from the film Seagulls Over Sorrento were shot at Fort Clonque in 1953.

The fort fell into disuse before being bought by the Landmark Trust in 1966 and is now used as self-catering accommodation for up to thirteen people.

In 2014, the fort was damaged by severe storms on the Channel Islands.
