= Shenick Island =

Uninhabited island off Skerries, near Dublin, Ireland

Native name: Oileán na Sionnach
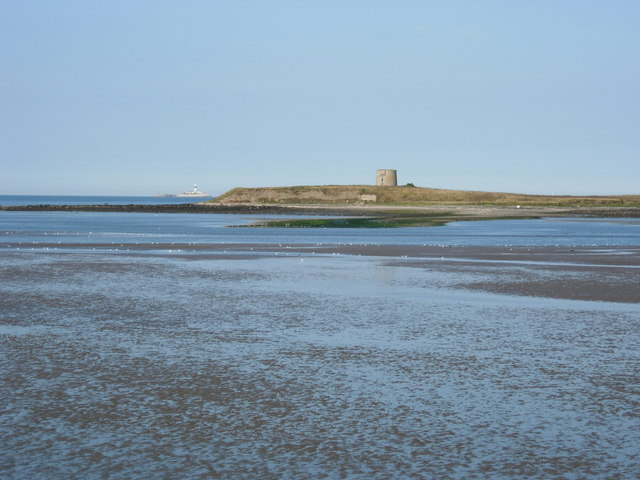
- Shenick Island with Martello Tower. Rockabill is visible in the background

- Location within island of Ireland

Geography
- Location: The Irish Sea
- Coordinates: 53.5722°N 6.0835°W
- Archipelago: Skerries

Administration
- Ireland
- Province: Leinster
- County: Dublin

Demographics
- Population: 0 (2011)

Shenick Island or Shenick's Island (Irish: Oileán na Sionnach, meaning 'fox island') is an island that lies east of Skerries, County Dublin, Ireland. It is populated only by seals that harbour on the western side of the island and a few different species of seabirds nest there. It may be reached by boat but at low tide it may be reached by crossing a sand bank.

The most prominent feature on Shenick Island is a Martello tower. It is possible to climb into the tower with some effort. The tower is relatively intact, however any wooden floors are gone. The spiral staircase is still intact and access to the tower roof is possible. The old cooking grate is still intact but the iron grate is heavily rusted. The tower is exactly 1 mile from the great windmill in Skerries and approximately 1 mile from the Monument on Strand Street and the Martello tower on Red Island.

The Island had a population of four people in 1841.

Shenick Island can be reached most easily at Spring Tide.
