= Kempt Tower =

Coordinates: 49°13′16.34″N 2°13′39.29″W

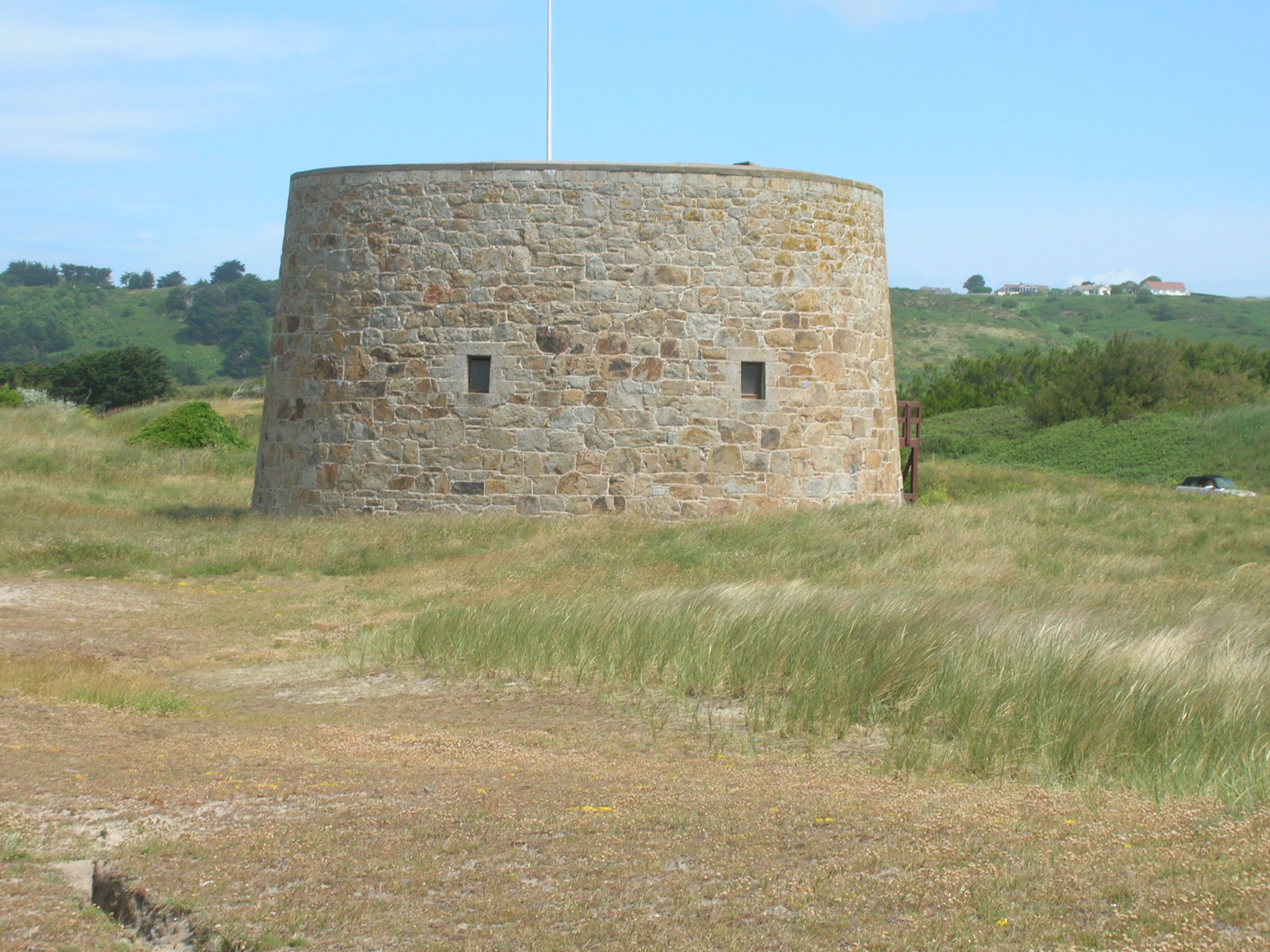
Kempt Tower, Jersey

Kempt Tower, in La Grande Cueillette, Saint Ouen, Jersey, is also known as Saint Ouen No. 2 and La Grôsse Tou in Jèrriais, and is a Martello tower that the British completed in 1834. It is named for Sir James Kempt, the Master-General of the Ordnance from 1830 to 1834. While governor of Canada, Kempt was involved in the planning for the use of Martello towers to protect the colony. Currently, Kempt Tower serves as the interpretation centre for Les Mielles conservation area.

== Design ==
Kempt Tower has a cam-shaped base, and has a trefoil gun platform. It too has a thicker-walled side facing the sea. It is shorter and wider than its near neighbour, Lewis Tower. The interior of the tower is a doughnut-shaped space around a brick column, and has a curved ceiling. The tower measures 35 ft (11 m) in height and 27 ft (8.2 m) in diameter. The door at ground level represents a modification by the German occupation of the Channel Islands.

The tower itself was armed with a 24-pounder gun and two 24-pounder short guns. In front of the tower there was a paved redoubt that was armed with three 24-pounder guns.

== Citations and references ==
Citations

References

- Clements, William H. (1998) Towers of Strength: Story of Martello Towers. (London: Pen & Sword). ISBN 978-0-85052-679-0.
- Grimsley, E.J. (1988) The Historical Development of the Martello Tower in the Channel Islands. (Sarnian Publications). ISBN 978-0-9513868-0-4
- Sutcliffe, Sheila (1973) Martello Towers. (Cranbury, NJ: Associated Universities Press).
