= Bullock Harbour =

Small working harbour near Dalkey, Ireland

- Interactive map of Bullock Harbour
- Location within Ireland
- Native name: Cuan Bhlóic (Irish)

Location
- Country: Ireland
- Location: Dalkey, County Dublin
- Coordinates: 53°17′07″N 6°06′28″W

Details
- Built: 1818–1819 (current quay and walls)
- Type of Harbor: Fishing, Leisure

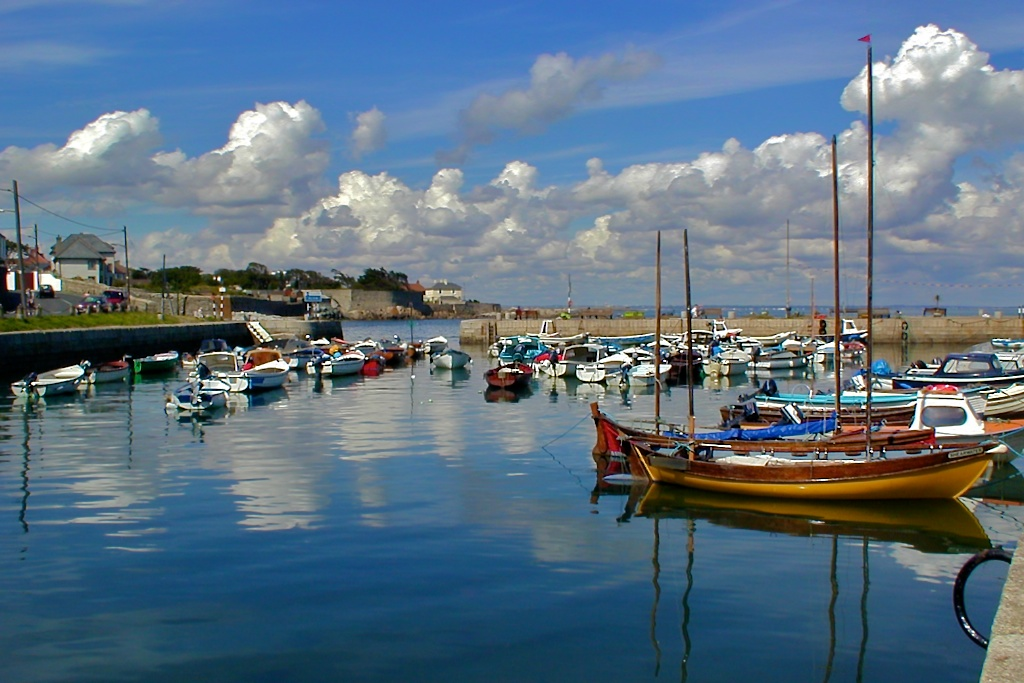
Bulloch Harbour, Dalkey, Co. Dublin. Photo courtesy of www.dalkeyphotos.com

Bullock Harbour or Bulloch Harbour (Irish: Cuan Bhlóic) is a small working harbour located near the heritage town of Dalkey on the southeast coast of Dublin Bay in Ireland.

The current harbour quay and walls were constructed of local granite in the early 19th century where previously a rocky inlet had provided a natural harbour. Bullock Harbour is the subject of a specific local objective (SLO22) in the Dun Laoghaire Rathdown County Council's county development plan.

== History ==
Bulloch Castle was built in the 12th century by the Cistercian monks of Dublin's St Mary's Abbey, in order to protect local fisheries. There was a small stone quay situated below the castle walls, which was partially sheltered by a breakwater. Records notably show the embarking and departure of several Viceroys at Bulloch en route to Dublin.

The quay would stay in use, unchanged from its medieval state, until construction of the current harbour began in 1818, with the facility being finished in 1819. The quay was heavily expanded, with a new granite pier and walls built to form the current harbour. Cranes were installed on the pier to facilitate the transport of stone, sourced from the rocks to the east, and later used for the commercial transport of coal. Large iron rings, which can still be seen on the rocks outside the pier, were used to winch boats in and out of the harbour.

== Name ==
The name of the harbour and castle has variously been Bullock, Bulloch, Bloyke and Bullog.

== Location ==
Bulloch Harbour is located at the Sandycove (northern) end of Harbour Road in Dalkey, County Dublin. Bulloch Castle, an imposing Norman structure, overlooks the harbour which is ten minutes walk from Dalkey Dart Station.

== Harbour activities ==
There are two businesses offering boats for hire for fishing, sightseeing or visiting Dalkey Island, about a kilometre away. Lobster and crabs are harvested when weather permits, and mackerel are fished for in season.

Marine leisure activities include kayaking, sea scouts, sea fishing and angling, and rock climbing.

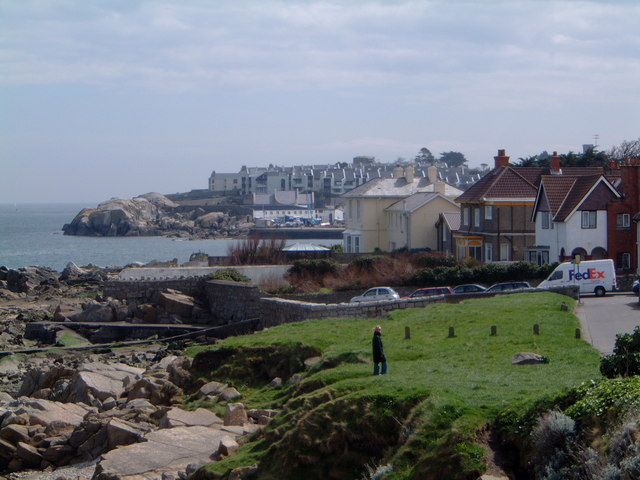
View of Bullock Harbour inlet from the north, near James Joyce's tower in Sandycove

== Wildlife ==
A family of seals lives at the harbour and likes being fed by local children and tourists. Common and bottleneck dolphins have been reported in the vicinity. The diversity of marine flora and fauna reflects that of the Dalkey coastline.

== In Media ==
Bullock Harbour is mentioned in Michael O'Hanrahan's romance A Swordsman of the Brigade as "Bullock Strand". In the book, the protagonist Piaras Grás oversees the smuggling of recruits to join the Irish Brigade, and later duels a British officer.
