= Victoria Tower, Jersey =

Coordinates: 49.2026°N 2.0210°W

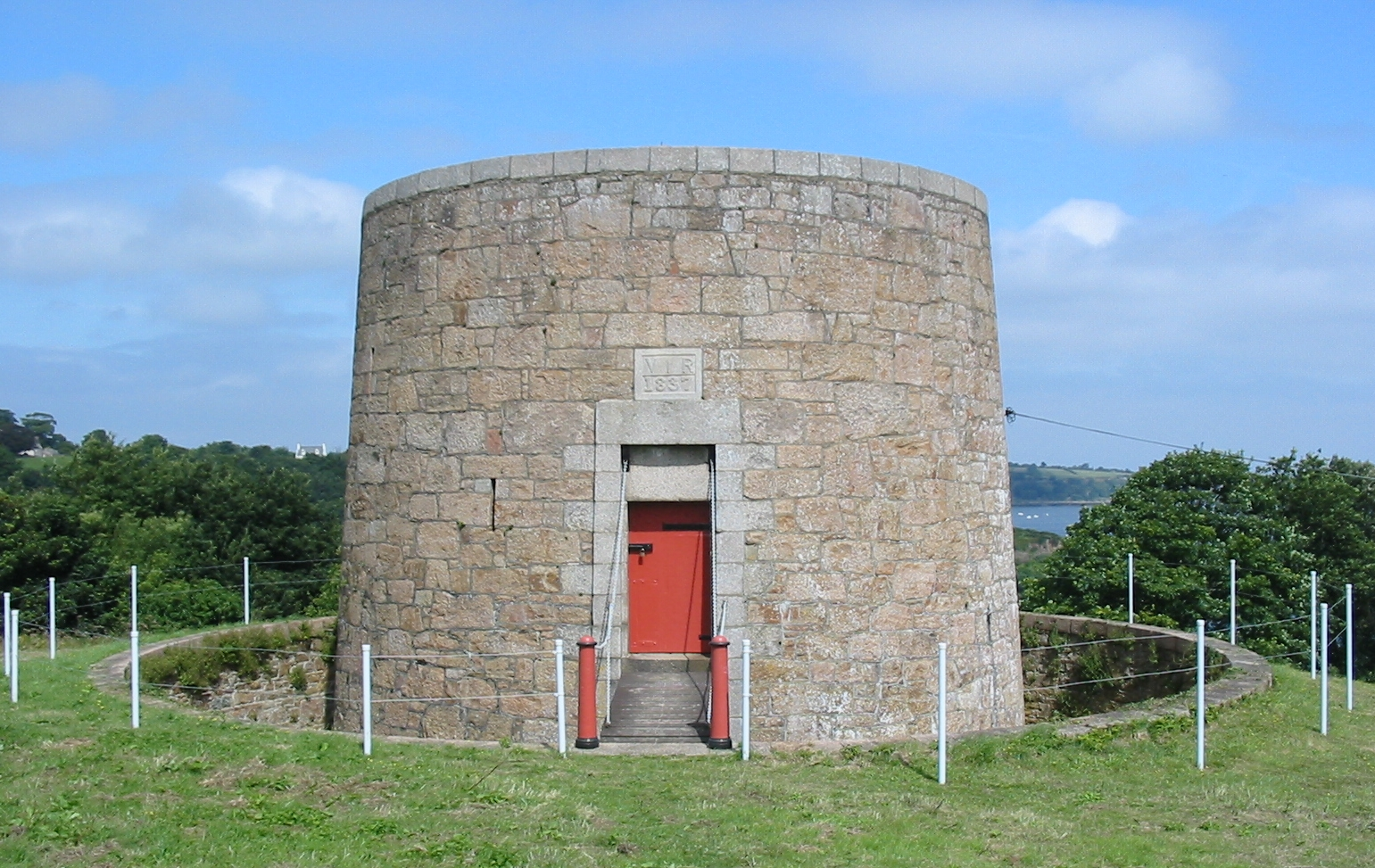
Victoria Tower

Victoria Tower, Jersey, is a Martello tower that the British completed in 1837 and named after Queen Victoria, who succeeded to the Throne in that year. The tower sits on Le Mont Nicholas in Saint Martin just to the west of the castle of Mont Orgueil. The purpose of the tower was to defend the bay of Anne Port to its north and Gorey Harbour to the south from enemy naval bombardment. Currently, the National Trust for Jersey administers the tower.

== Design ==
Victoria Tower is circular and measures 33 ft (10.1 m) in height and 32 ft (9.8 m) in diameter. The tower is the only Martello on Jersey to have a ditch around it. The ditch itself is 12 ft (3.7 m) deep and 10 ft (3.0 m) across. A drawbridge spans the ditch. In the counterscarp beneath the drawbridge there is a small room, with two doors, that may have been a store room. Inside the tower a circular staircase connected the three floors. The tower was armed with a single 24-pounder gun. During World War II and the Occupation of the Channel Islands, the Germans placed a small anti-aircraft gun on the top of the tower and constructed an entire strongpoint at the site, operated by a garrison of ninety-nine troops from the German Infantry, Artillery and Kriegsmarine.
