= Fort Recovery, Tortola =

Fort in the British Virgin Islands

Coordinates: 18.3865°N 64.6760°W

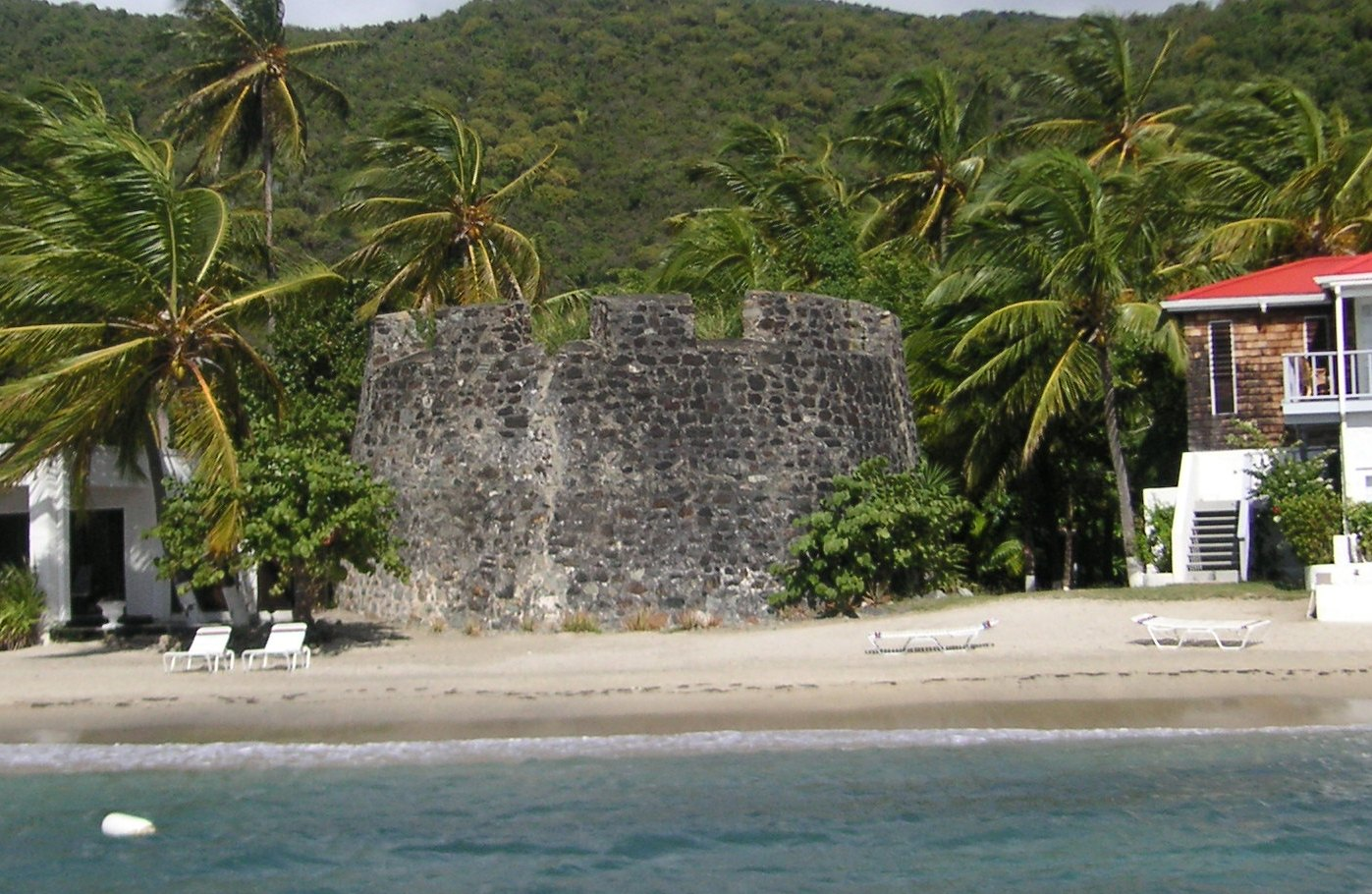
The Martello Tower of Fort Recovery.

Fort Recovery is a fort on the West End of Tortola in the British Virgin Islands. In historical records, the fort is often referred to as Tower Fort, and the area around the fort is still referred to as "Towers" today. A hotel is now built around the Tower Fort Recovery Villas and Suites.

== History ==
The site was originally an earthen fort that was probably built by the Dutch privateer Joost van Dyk in 1620, when the truce, which had existed between the Dutch and the Spanish in Puerto Rico, ended.

Somewhere between 1623 and 1630, Fort Recovery may have been used as a barracks for wounded and ill soldiers; this is probably the source of the name "Fort Recovery".

The Fort was later abandoned when the Territory fell into decline after the British seized control of the islands in 1672. However, during the turbulent colonial era commencing with the American Revolutionary War and extending to the Napoleonic Wars the fort was rebuilt in its current form. When the British rebuilt the fort, the Martello Tower was clearly added to try to compensate for the lack of elevation of the cannon at the Fort.

The fort fell into disrepair again in the early 19th century when the main theater of conflict moved from the colonies to mainland Europe, and the economies of the islands were insufficient for its upkeep. It may also have been that, if the fort was designed to protect a source of freshwater, when the source dried up (there is no freshwater pond there today) the necessity for the fort disappeared.

== Design and location ==
The fort itself is of a tower structure. The fort is a very early example of a Martello Tower, a type of fortification used extensively along the British south-east coastline during the Napoleonic wars.

The location of the fort is somewhat unusual in that it is built close to the sea, on level ground (instead on in an elevated position on the hills rising behind it) and not close to either a port or population source. It has been suggested that the fort was built to protect a freshwater pond that was located near the area. This is plausible; Tortola has no rivers, so wells and freshwater ponds were precious resources. The other possibility is that the fort was built to secure the trail that linked Soper's Hole to Pockwood Pond and Road Town as previous Spanish attacks had landed in Soper's Hole and then proceeded overland to Pockwood Pond and Road Town. It would have been difficult to fortify effectively Soper's Hole against Spanish cannon, but a fort on the soldiers' overland route could delay an attack and prevent another massacre of the type that occurred in 1646. The difficulty with this theory is that it still cannot explain why the fort was not elevated. Also, although it is not clear whether the fort was erected before or after the attacks of 1646 and 1647, it seems more likely that it was actually built before.

== Sources ==
- Isaac Dookhan, History of the British Virgin Islands, ISBN 0-85935-027-4
- Vernon Pickering, A Concise History of the British Virgin Islands, ISBN 0-934139-05-9
