= Portelet Tower =

Martello Tower built in Jersey in 1808

Coordinates: 49°10′12″N 2°10′40″W

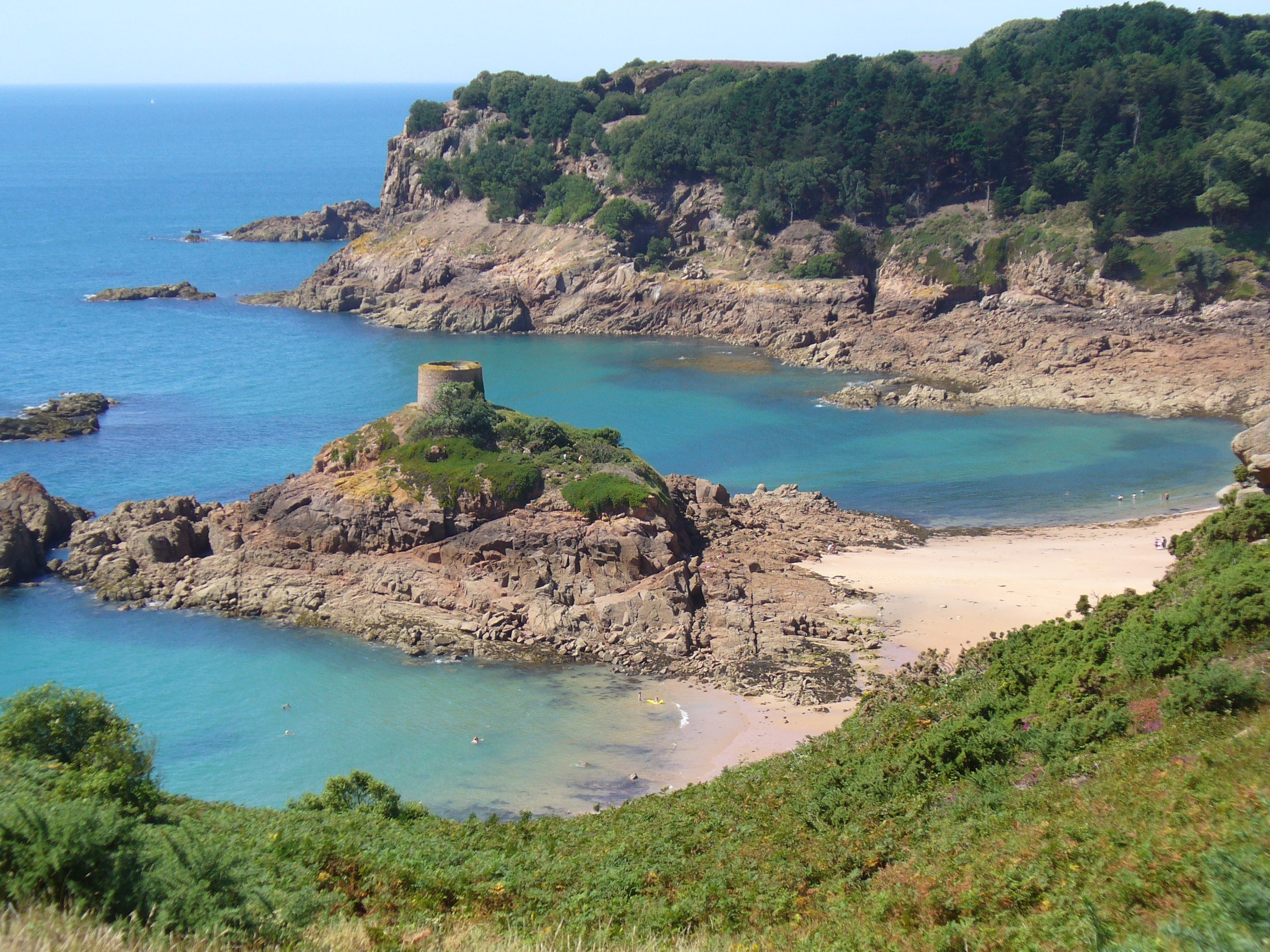
View of Portelet Tower during low tide.

Portelet Tower, Jersey, is a round tower that the British built in 1808 on the tidal island L'Île au Guerdain in Portelet Bay in the parish of Saint Brélade, Jersey. The site is often referred to as Janvrin's tower or Janvrin's Tomb. The site is accessible at low tide.

== Janvrin's tomb ==
Philippe Janvrin, a local seafarer, died of the plague in 1721, while on the way back to Jersey. Fear of contagion led the authorities to insist that he be buried on the tidal island, which became known as Janvrin's Tomb, though his body was later re-interred at St Brelade's.

== Design ==
The tower consists of only one room and was more of a guardhouse than a Martello tower . It has a doorway at ground level and one window about seven feet above the ground level. It is built of rubble stone and measures 17 ft (5.2 m) in height and 27 ft (8.2 m) in diameter.

After its completion in March 1808, Lieutenant Governor George Don ordered that coal be brought that a fire might be burned in it day and night for two weeks to dry it out. A garrison consisting of a sergeant and 12 men then occupied the fort, which was armed with an 18-pounder carronade.
