= La Preneuse =

Beach in Mauritius

Coordinates: 20.354°S 57.366°E

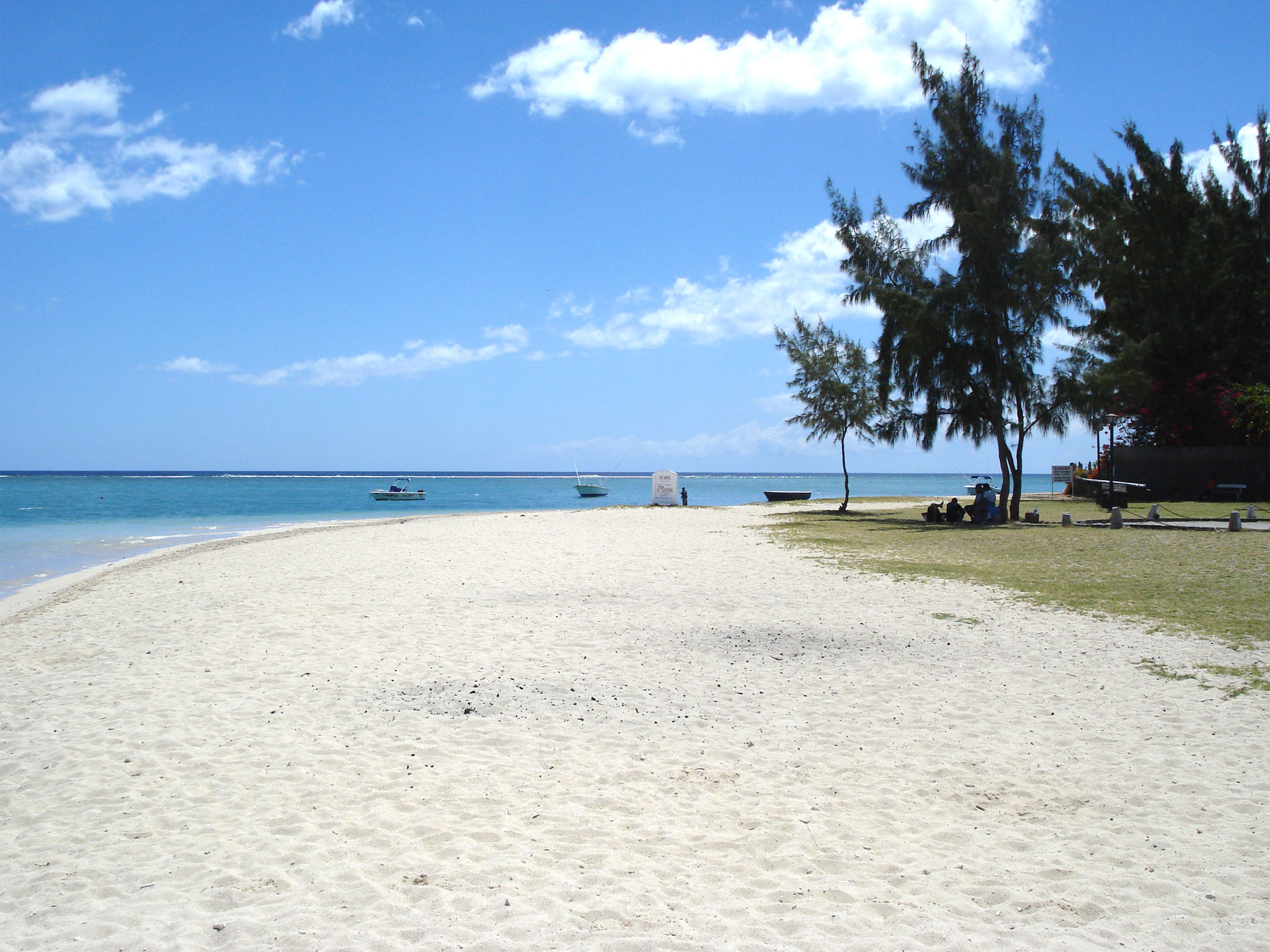
La Preneuse Beach, Mauritius

La Preneuse is a public beach in western coast of the island Mauritius in the district of Rivière Noire located in the village of Black River. It was named after a French ship, the frigate Preneuse, which served as a commerce raider at Isle de France (as Mauritius was then known) and was also involved in a naval battle with the British in the 18th century. The beach is home to the best preserved Martello tower in Mauritius.

== See also ==
- Martello Tower at La Preneuse
