= Martello tower =

Small defensive fort

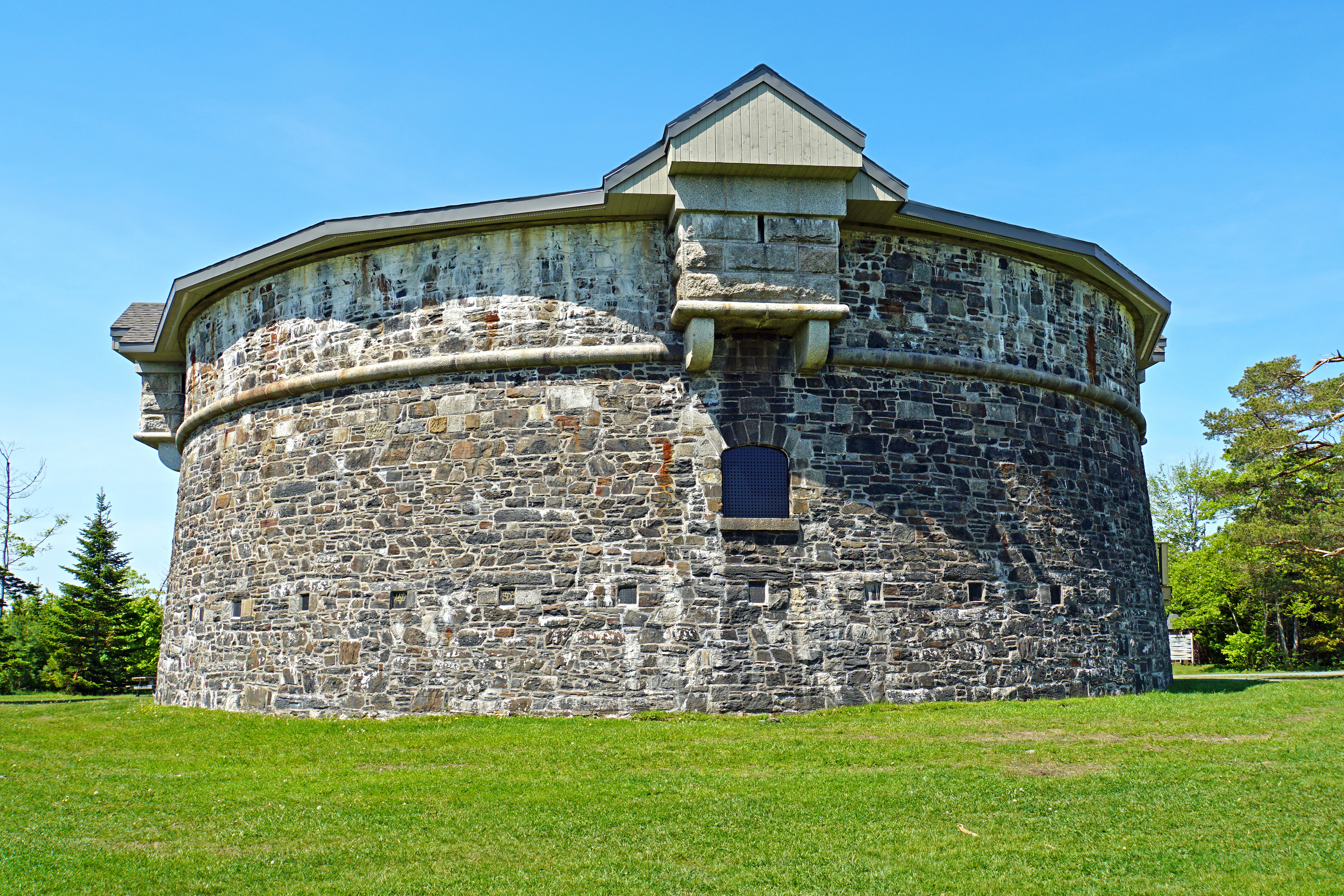
Prince of Wales Tower – oldest Martello tower in North America (1796), Point Pleasant Park, Halifax, Nova Scotia, Canada

A Martello tower is a type of small defensive fort that was built across the British Empire during the 19th century, from the time of the French Revolutionary Wars onwards. Most were for coastal defence.

A Martello tower stands up to 40 feet (12 m) high, with two floors and a typical garrison of one officer and 15–25 men. The round structure and thick solid masonry walls made it resistant to cannon fire, while its height made it an ideal platform for a single heavy artillery piece, mounted on the flat roof and able to traverse over a complete 360 degrees. A few towers had moats or other batteries and works attached for extra defence.

Martello towers were used during the first half of the 19th century, but became obsolete with the introduction of powerful rifled artillery. Many have survived, often preserved as historic monuments.

== Origins ==
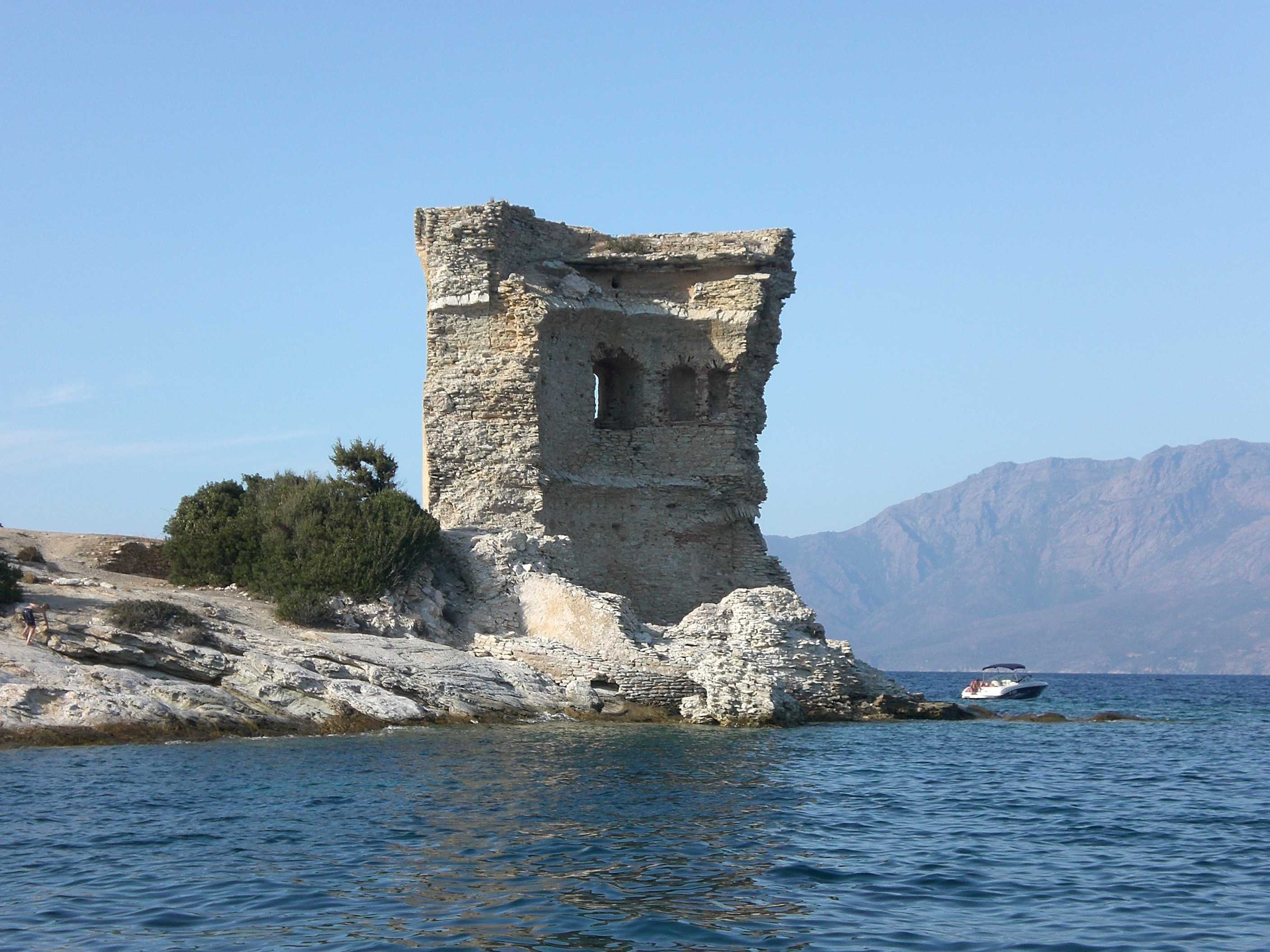
The resistance of the Torra di Mortella to the British in 1794 inspired Martello towers

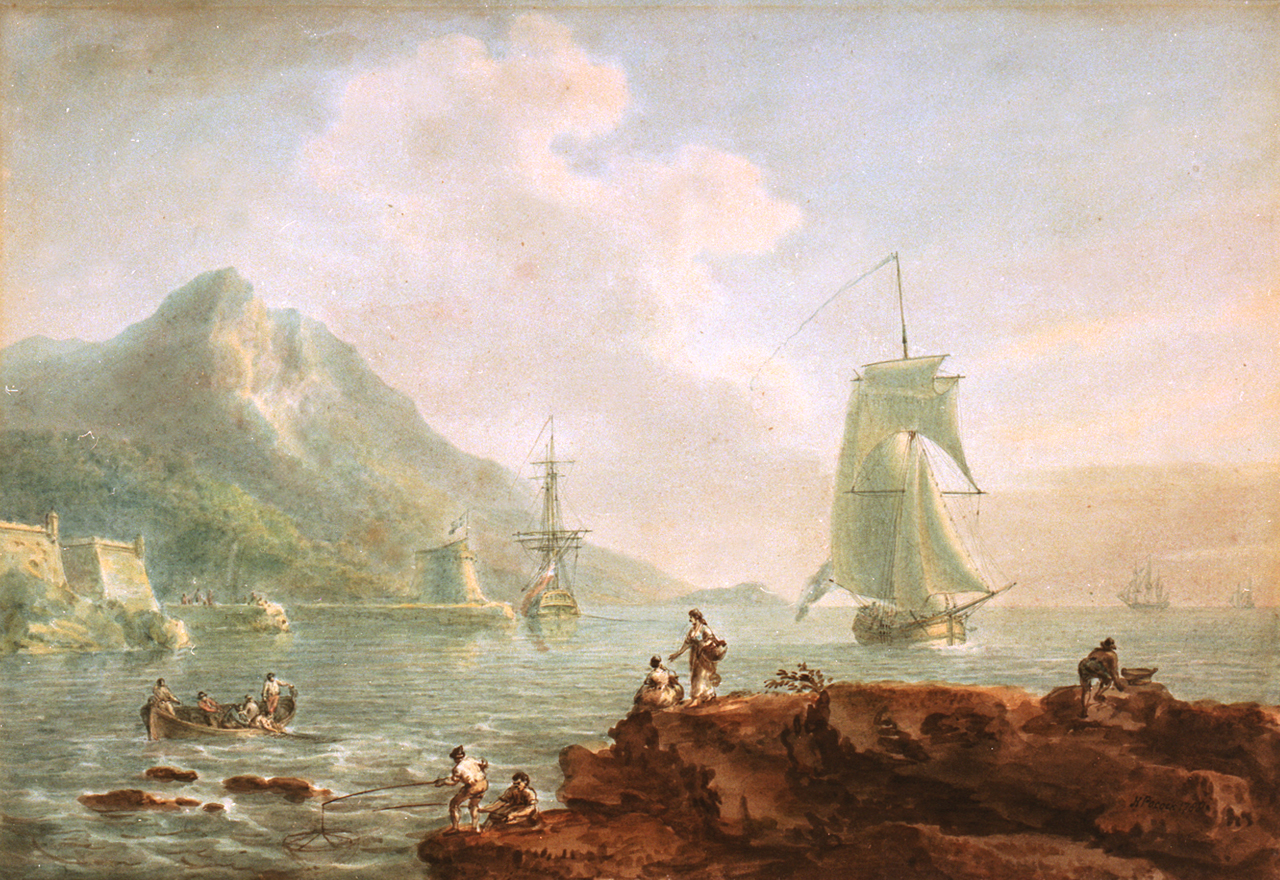
A view of Corsica and a Martello tower, 1788 painting "A cutter and a man of war off Corsica" by Nicholas Pocock

Martello towers were inspired by a round fortress that was part of a larger Genoese defence system at Mortella (Myrtle) Point in Corsica. Its designer was Giovan Giacomo Paleari Fratino (el Fratin), and the tower was completed in 1565.

Since the 15th century, the Corsicans had built similar towers at strategic points around the island to protect coastal villages and shipping from Barbary corsairs. The towers stood one or two storeys high and measured 12–15 m (39–49 ft) in diameter, with a single doorway five metres off the ground that one could access only via a ladder that the occupants could remove.

Local villagers paid for the towers and watchmen, known as torregiani, who would signal the approach of unexpected ships by lighting a beacon fire on the tower's roof. The fire would alert the local defence forces to the threat. Although the pirate threat subsequently dwindled, the Genoese built a newer generation of circular towers (the Genoese towers), that warded off later foreign raids.

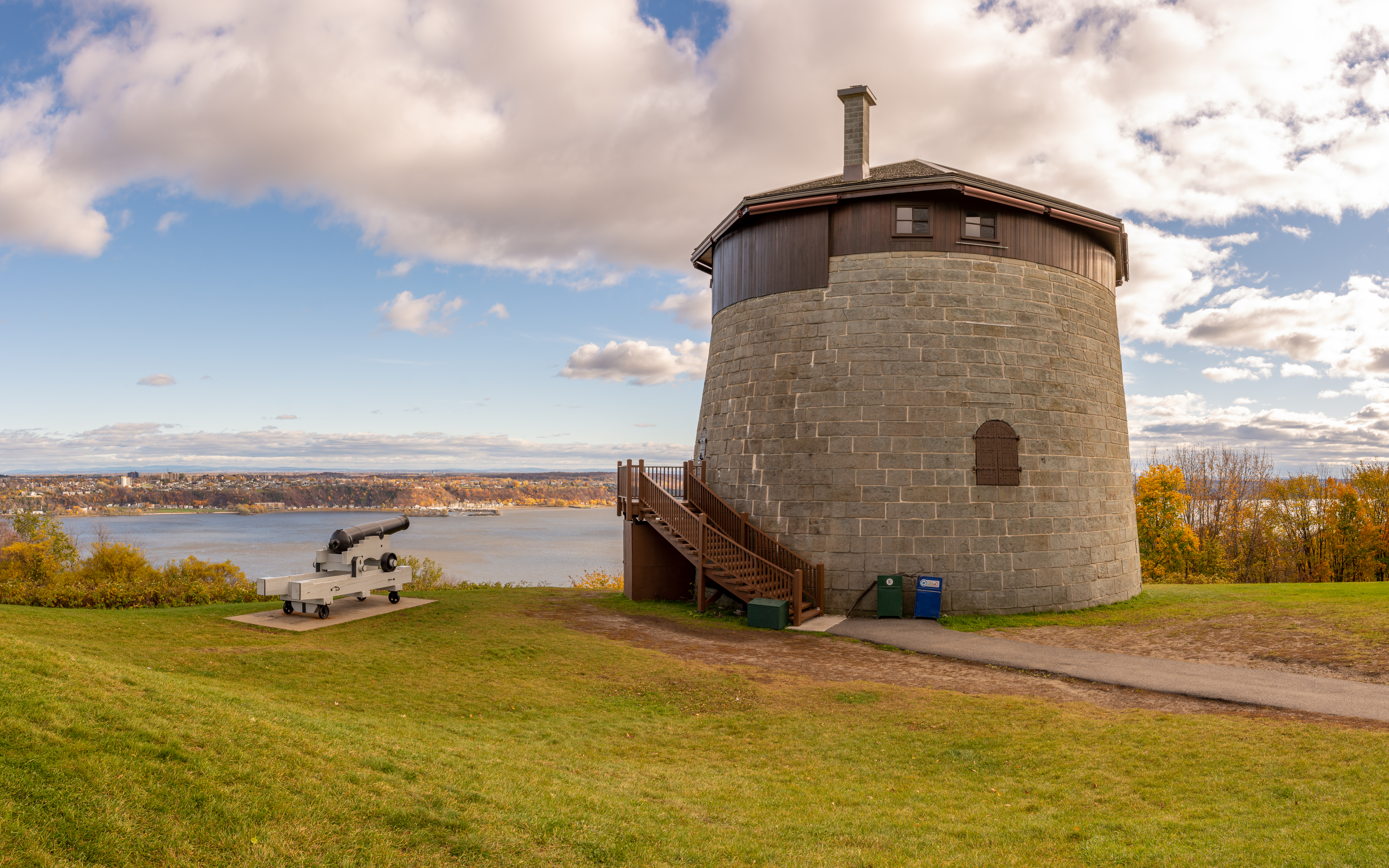
A Martello tower on the plains of Abraham in Quebec City (Quebec, Canada), at the top of Cap Diamant overlooking the Saint Lawrence River.

On 7 February 1794 as part of the siege of San Fiorenzo, two Royal Navy warships, the 74-gun HMS Fortitude and 32-gun Juno, unsuccessfully attacked the tower at Mortella Point; the tower eventually fell to British troops under Sir John Moore after two days of heavy fighting. The British capture was helped by the fact that the tower's two 18-pounder guns fired seaward, while only the one 6-pounder could fire landward.

Vice-Admiral Lord Hood reported:

The Fortitude and Juno were ordered against it, without making the least impression by a continued cannonade of two hours and a half; and the former ship being very much damaged by red-hot shot, both hauled off. The walls of the Tower were of a prodigious thickness, and the parapet, where there were two eighteen-pounders, was lined with bass junk, (Note: Bass-junk was a type of cable made of grass. The Oxford English Dictionary reports that "bass" is a name "given elliptically to various articles made of this [fibre] or similar material; e.g. a mat, a hassock, a flat plaited bag or flexible basket.") five feet from the walls, and filled up with sand; and although it was cannonaded from the Height for two days, within 150 yards, and appeared in a very shattered state, the enemy still held out; but a few hot shot setting fire to the bass, made them call for quarter. The number of men in the Tower were 33; only two were wounded, and those mortally.

Late in the previous year, the tower's French defenders had abandoned it after HMS Lowestoffe (32 guns) had fired two broadsides at it. The British removed the guns to arm a small vessel; consequently, the French were easily able to dislodge the garrison of Corsican patriots that had replaced them. Still, the British were impressed by the effectiveness of the tower when properly supplied and defended, and copied the design. But they got the name wrong, misspelling "Mortella" as "Martello" (which means "hammer" in Italian). When the British withdrew from Corsica in 1803, with great difficulty they blew up the tower, leaving it in an unusable state.

== Design and construction ==
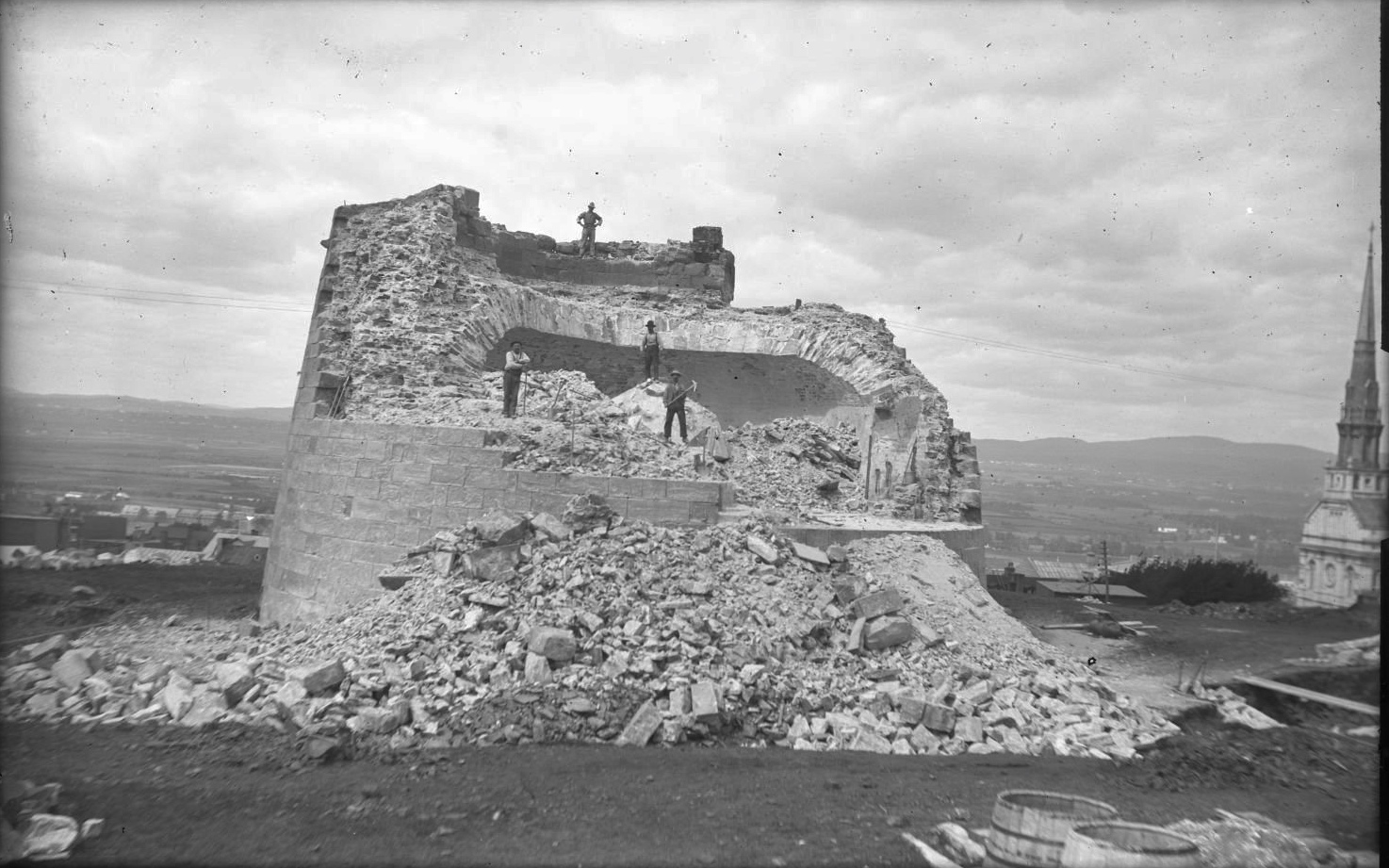
Québec city had four Martello towers, but tower no. 3 was demolished in 1904. In this picture, the internal structure can be seen.

The towers were about 40 feet (12 m) high with walls about 8 feet (2.4 m) thick. In some towers the rooms were not built in the centre, but more to the landside, leaving the walls thicker on seaside. These were cases where an attack with a cannon from the landside was thought very unlikely. Entry was by ladder to a door about 10 feet (3.0 m) from the base above which was a machicolated (slotted) platform which allowed for downward fire on attackers. The flat roof or terreplein had a high parapet and a raised platform in the centre with a pivot (sometimes a converted cannon) for a cannon that would traverse a 360° arc. (Some towers were designed to carry more than one gun, with each having a more limited arc of fire.) The walls had narrow slits for defensive musket fire.

Diagram of the interior of a Martello tower

The interior of a classic British Martello tower consisted of two storeys (sometimes with an additional basement). The ground floor served as the magazine and storerooms, where ammunition, water, stores and provisions were kept. The garrison of 24 men and one officer lived in a casemate on the first floor, which was divided into several rooms and had fireplaces built into the walls for cooking and heating. The officer and men lived in separate rooms of almost equal size. A well or cistern within the fort supplied the garrison with water. An internal drainage system linked to the roof enabled rainwater to refill the cistern.

== Martello towers around the world ==
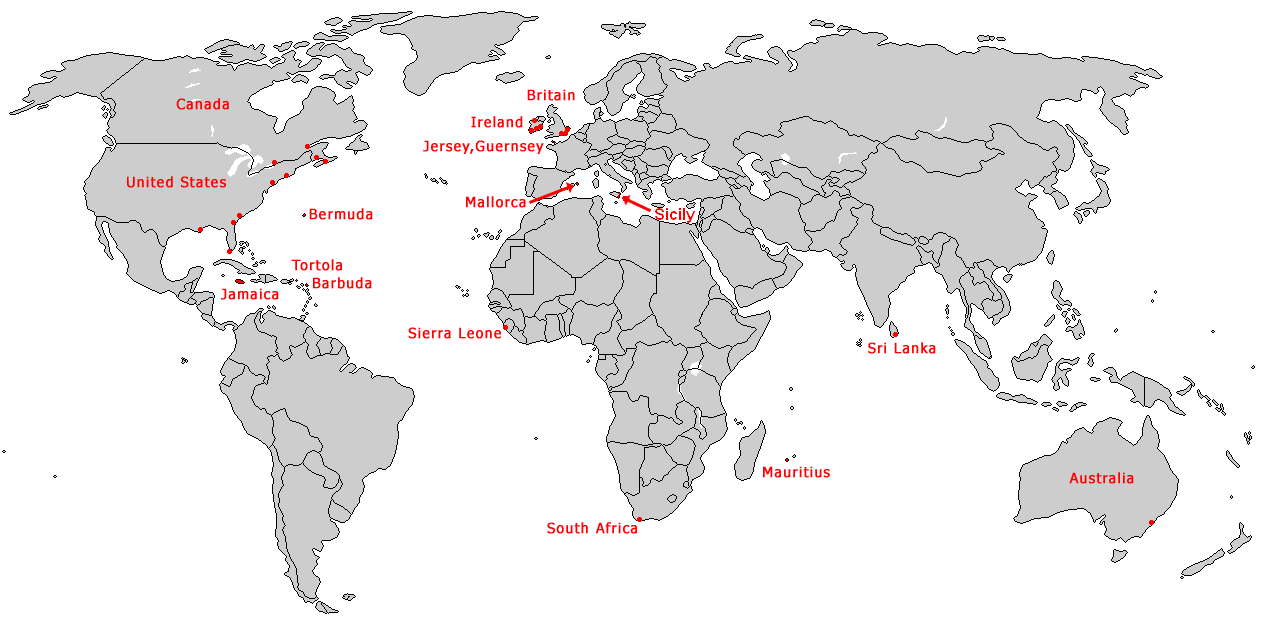
Distribution of Martello towers worldwide

During the first half of the 19th century, the British government embarked on a large-scale programme of building Martello towers to guard the British and Irish coastlines. Around 140 were built, mostly along the south coast of England. Governments in Australia, Canada, Menorca, South Africa and Sri Lanka also constructed towers. The construction of Martello towers abroad continued until as late as the 1870s but was discontinued after it became clear that they could not withstand the new generation of rifled artillery weapons.

The French built similar towers along their own coastline that they used as platforms for communication by optical telegraphs (using the Chappe Telegraph). The United States government also built a number of Martello towers along the east coast of the US that copied the British design with some modifications.

=== United Kingdom of Great Britain and Ireland ===
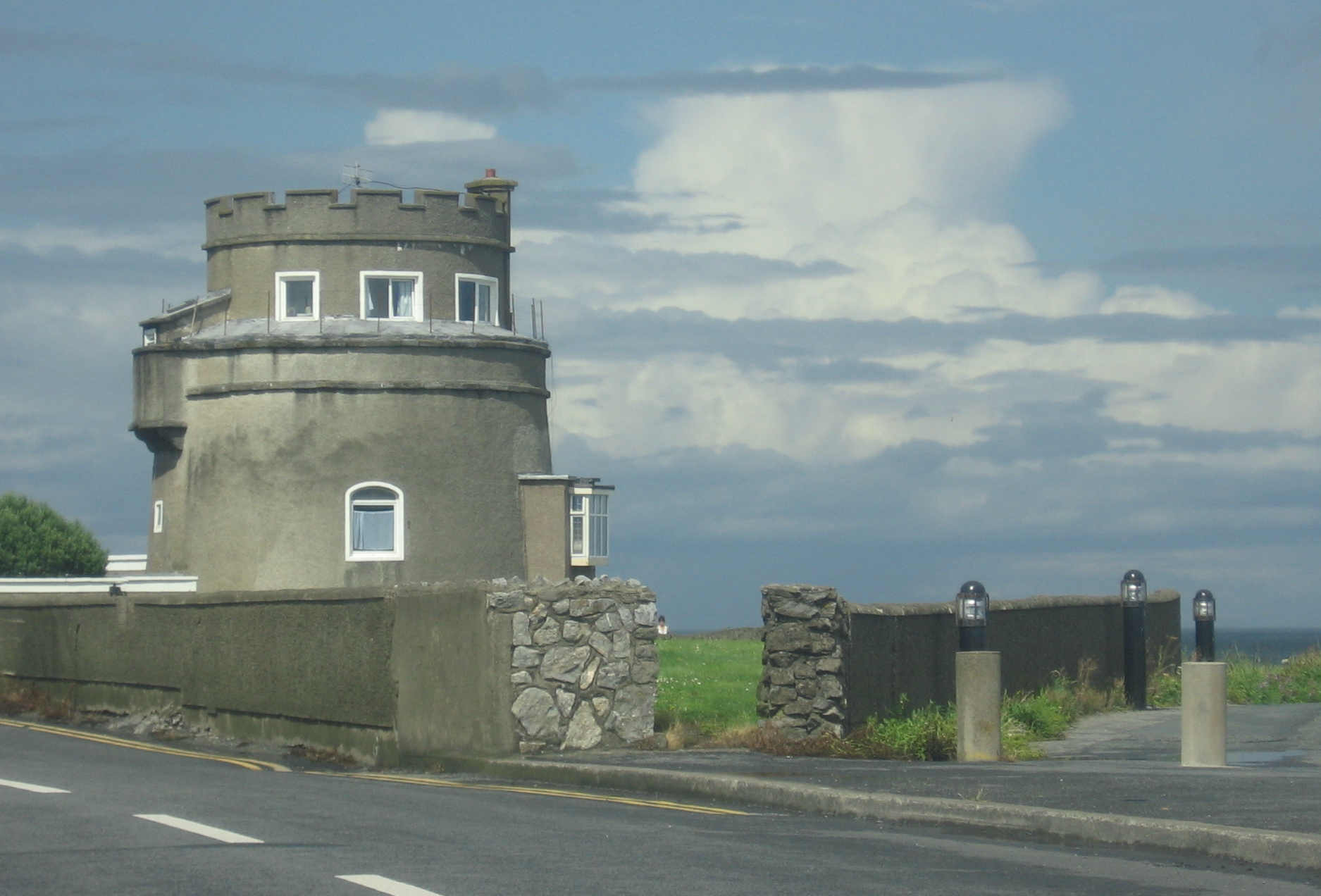
Portmarnock Martello tower, one of many on Ireland's east coast

Great Britain and Ireland were united as a single political entity, the United Kingdom of Great Britain and Ireland, from 1801 to 1922, spanning the time during which most Martello towers were erected (the initial scheme started under the previous entities of the Kingdom of Great Britain and Kingdom of Ireland). Consequently, the Martello towers of Great Britain and Ireland can be considered to have been part of a single defensive system, designed to protect the coastlines of the two main islands of the British Isles as a whole.

This is most clearly visible on the south and east coasts of England and the east coast of Ireland, where chains of Martello towers were built. Elsewhere in the world, individual Martello towers were erected to provide point defence of strategic locations.

Between 1804 and 1812 the British authorities built a chain of towers based on the original Mortella tower to defend the south and east coast of England, Ireland, Jersey and Guernsey to guard against possible invasion from France, then under the rule of Napoleon I.

==== England ====
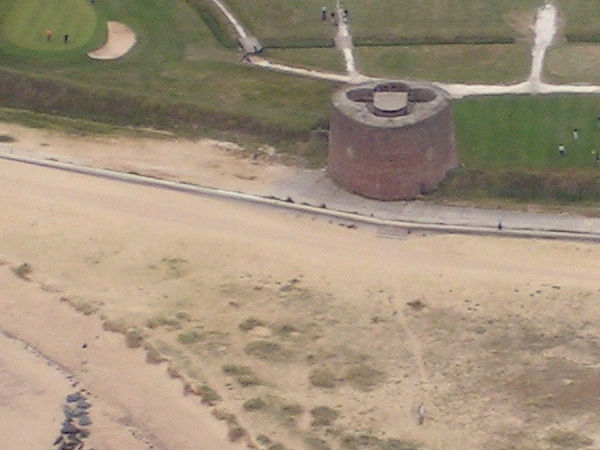
An aerial view of the western of two Martello towers at Clacton-on-Sea

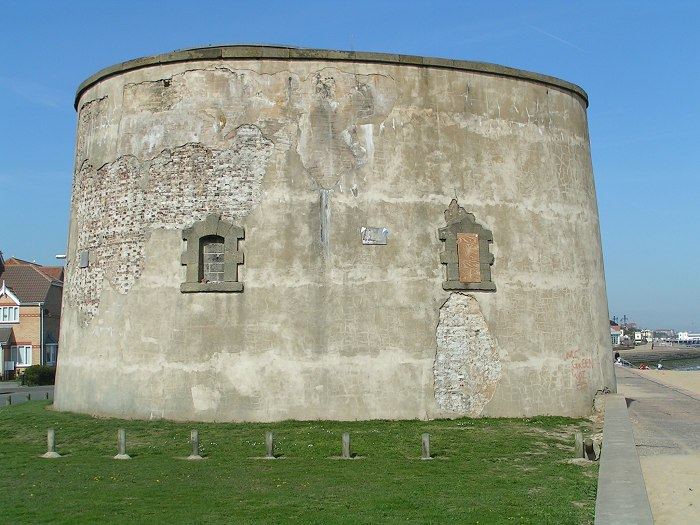
The eastern of two Martello towers at Clacton-on-Sea

A total of 103 Martello towers were built in England, set at regular intervals along the coast from Seaford, Sussex, to Aldeburgh, Suffolk. Most were constructed under the direction of General William Twiss (1745–1827) and a Captain Ford. The northernmost tower at Aldeburgh is of quatrefoil design, i.e. four in one. There are two towers at Clacton-on-Sea, one near the town and the other to the west near the local golf course.

Included in the scheme were three much larger circular forts or redoubts that were constructed at Harwich, Dymchurch and Eastbourne; they acted as supply depots for the smaller towers as well as being powerful fortifications in their own right.

The effectiveness of Britain's Martello towers was never actually tested in combat against a Napoleonic invasion fleet. They were, however, effective in hindering smuggling. After the threat had passed, the Martello towers in England met a variety of fates. The Coastguard took over many to aid in the fight against smuggling.

Fifteen towers were demolished to enable the re-use of their masonry. The sea washed thirty away and the military destroyed four in experiments to test the effectiveness of the new rifled artillery. During the Second World War, some Martello towers returned to military service as observation platforms and firing platforms for anti-aircraft artillery.

Forty-seven Martello towers have survived in England, a few of which have been restored and transformed into museums (e.g., the towers at Point Clear and Seaford), visitor centres, and galleries (such as Jaywick Martello Tower). Some are privately owned or are private residences. The remainder are derelict. A survey of the East Coast towers in 2007 found that of the 17 remaining, most were in a reasonable condition.

Many remaining Martello towers are now listed buildings.

A fuller list of British towers, with photographs, is available.

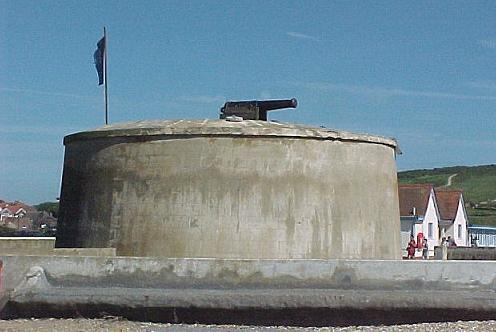
Martello Tower on Seaford seafront in East Sussex, housing the Museum

==== Scotland ====
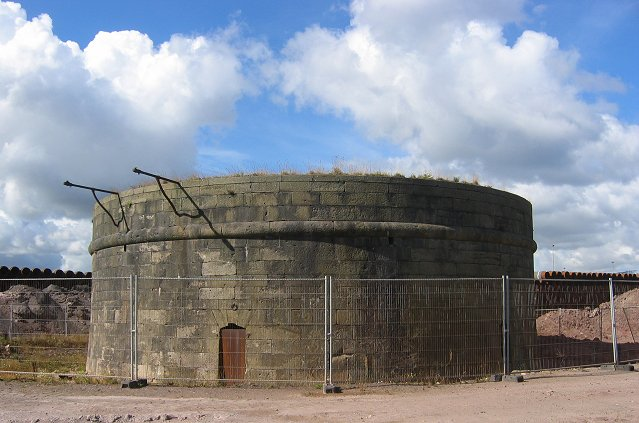
The Tally Toor, in Leith, Edinburgh, Scotland.

Three Martello towers were built in Scotland, the first on offshore rocks facing the Firth of Forth in 1807–1809 to defend Leith Harbour. The Tally Toor now lies land-locked within the eastern breakwater.

Two towers were then built at Hackness and Crockness, near Longhope in Orkney. They were constructed between 1813 and 1815 to guard against the threat of French and American raiders attacking convoys assembling offshore. Historic Scotland now operates the Hackness tower as a museum.

==== Wales ====
A small number of Martello towers were also built in Wales, of which few survive. The most notable surviving towers are the two located in Pembroke Dock, which were built between 1848 and 1857 to protect the naval base there. Today, one of the towers is privately owned. The other is located on the town's riverfront, next to the old entrance of the naval base. It was converted into a small museum that focused on the local history of the dock and its defences. The museum has now shut down because of water influx. Recently Pembrokeshire County Council has decided to put the tower up for sale.

==== Ireland ====
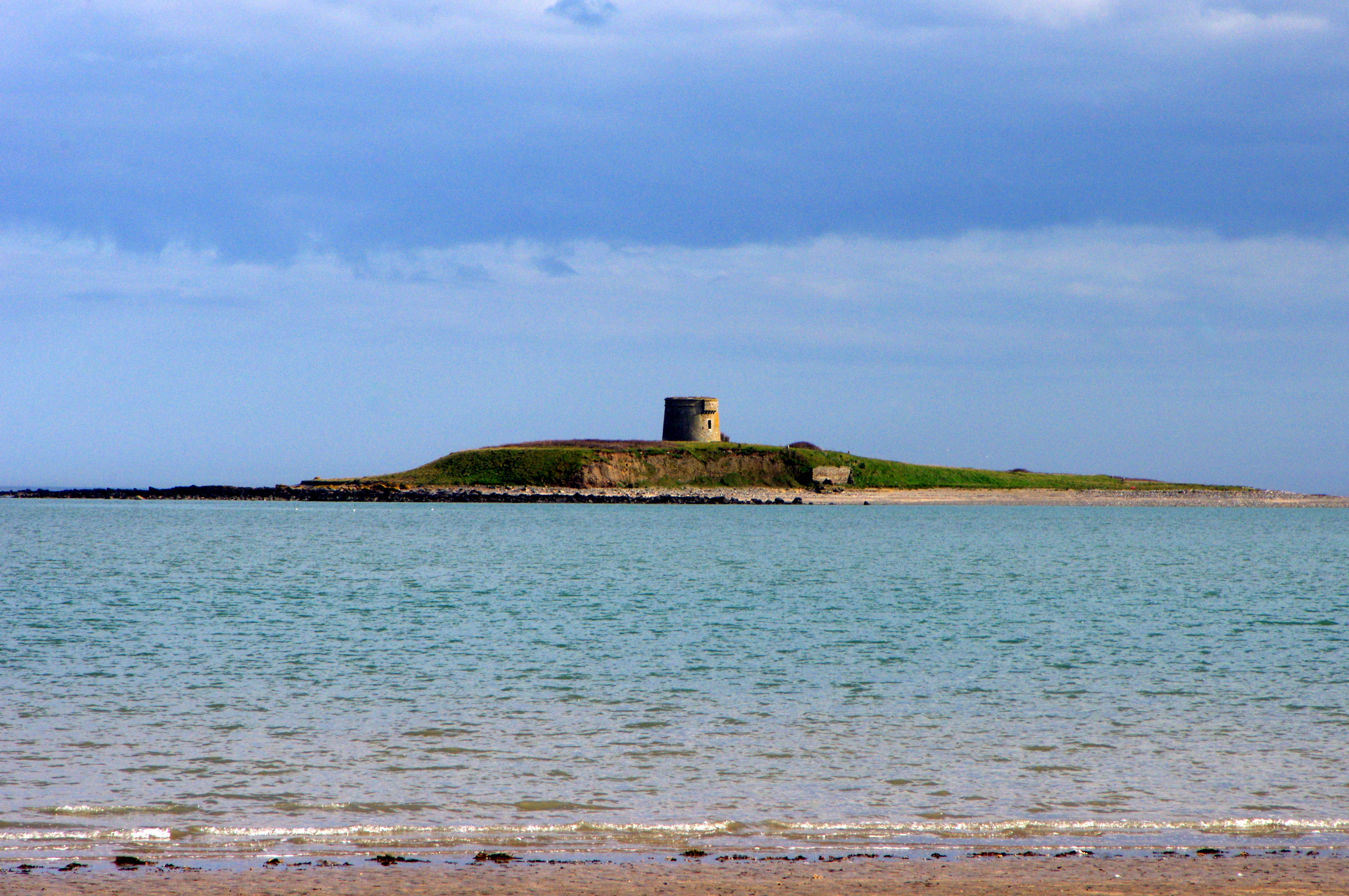
Offshore Martello tower on Shenick Island, County Dublin

About fifty Martello towers were built around the Irish coastline, especially along the east coast, from Millmount (Drogheda), to Bray, around Dublin Bay (29 installations) but also around Cork Harbour on the south coast. On the east coast, concentrated mainly around Dublin Bay, twenty-six towers were in line of sight of each other, providing the ability to communicate with one another, or warn of any incoming attacks.

Possibly the most famous is the Martello tower in Sandycove, near Dún Laoghaire, in which James Joyce lived for a few days. Joyce shared the tower with Oliver St. John Gogarty, then a medical student but later to become famous in Irish history as a surgeon, politician and writer. In Ulysses, the fictional character Stephen Dedalus lives in the tower with a medical student, Malachi "Buck" Mulligan, whom Joyce based on Gogarty. The James Joyce Tower, as the tower is now known, houses a museum dedicated to Joyce.

A number of other Martello towers are extant nearby at Bullock Harbour, Dalkey Island, Williamstown, Seapoint and Sandymount and Martello towers feature in many literary works set in Dublin. During the 1980s, Bono owned the Martello tower in Bray, County Wicklow.

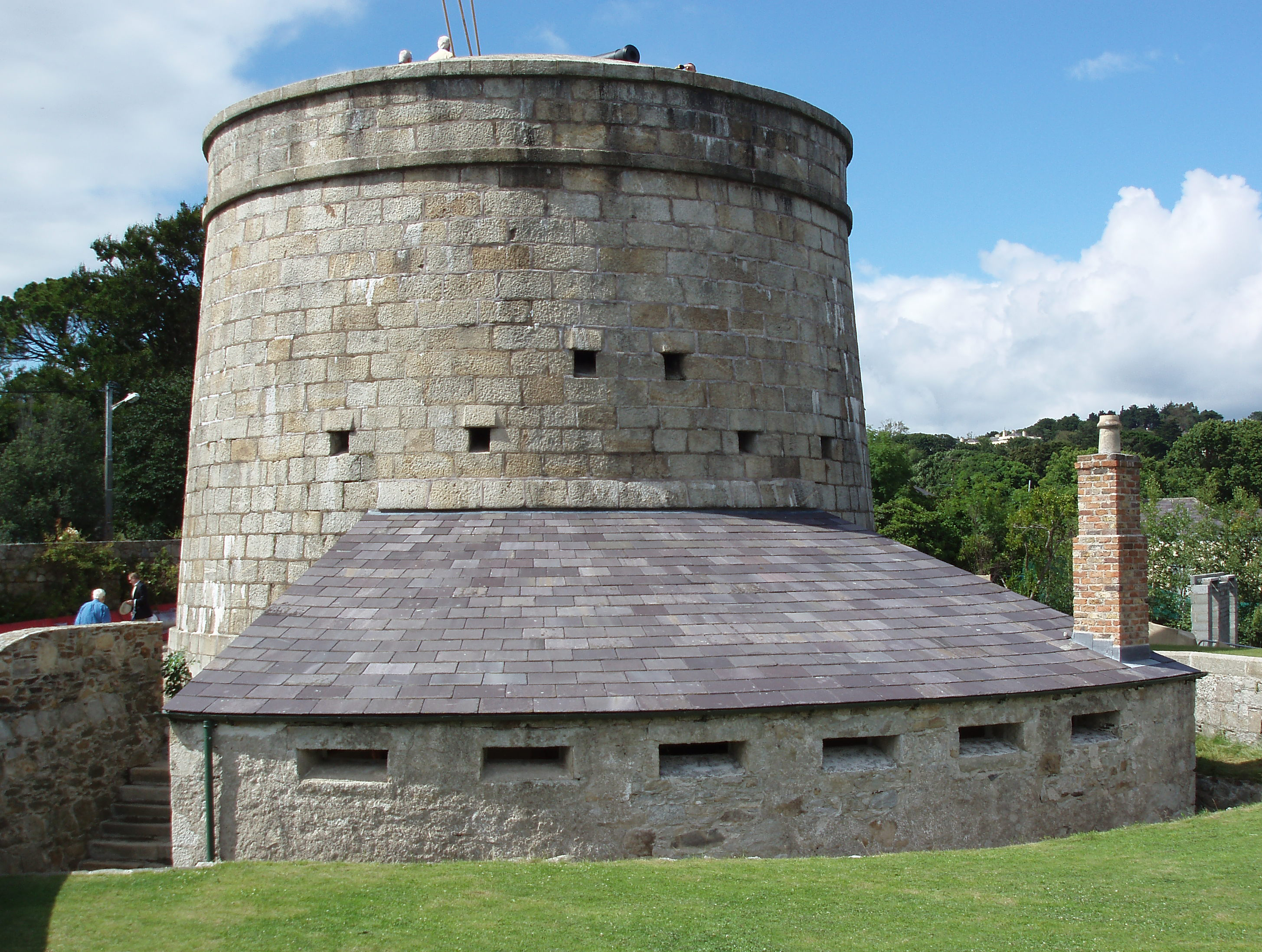
Martello tower (South No.7) at Killiney

Martello Tower South No.7, on Tara Hill, Killiney Bay, is unique, as is its location as an enfilading tower. The Tower is privately owned and has been fully restored, to include a proofed, working King George 3rd Blomefield 18-pounder cannon mounted on a traversing carriage on the crown of the Tower. There is a three-gun battery below the tower, with a glacis. There is also a coach house, artillery store, tool shed, and gunner's cottage, with resident gunner and gunpowder store. The battery, while restored, remains to be armed and the coach house and artillery store still require some restoration.

On the north side of Dublin, one can find Martello towers in Balbriggan, Shenick Island and Red Island at Skerries, Drumanagh Fort, Rush, Tower Bay in Portrane, Donabate, Malahide (Hicks tower owned by Tony Quinn), Portmarnock, Ireland's Eye, Howth, and Sutton.

There were seven Martello towers in the vicinity of Cork Harbour of which five are extant. During the 19th century Fenian uprising, the famous Captain Mackey briefly captured and held the Monning Martello tower near Fota Island in Cork Harbour; this tower is believed to have been the only Martello tower ever captured, other than the original. The other Cork Harbour towers are at Ringaskiddy, Haulbowline Island (now part of the Irish Naval Service HQ) and at Belvelly and Rossleague on the Great Island (near Cobh). There are also Martello towers at Little Island and Rostellan, though these are no longer intact.

The British built two Martello towers on the Hook Peninsula to protect the fort near Duncannon, County Wexford and the entrance to Waterford Harbour. There is a third tower on the headland at Baginbun Bay in County Wexford.

One of the most interesting Martello towers is Meelick Martello Tower at Clonahenoge, County Offaly, guarding the Shannon river crossing to Meelick, County Galway. As this tower supports three guns (unlike the normal Martello tower which is circular on plan and carries only one gun), it is cam shaped on plan. Currently a rampant growth of ivy covers the tower.

The tower at Seapoint, County Dublin, which was the property of Blackrock Urban District Council, was formerly the clubhouse of the Seapoint Boat Club from 1916 to 1931, and was subsequently the headquarters of the Genealogical Society of Ireland (GSI). The GSI vacated the tower when it found that the atmosphere was not conducive to the preservation of records.

The restored tower at Ilnacullin is a feature of an island garden in Glengarriff, County Cork. Several other towers are still extant, including one at Rathmullan in County Donegal and two in County Clare on the south coast of Galway Bay in the townlands of Finavarra and Aughinish. There is also an extant Martello tower located near the settlement of Magilligan Point in County Londonderry, built between 1812 and 1871 to defend against a possible French invasion during the Napoleonic Wars; it is now a visitor attraction.

A Martello-like tower was built on Achill Island, according to local memory during the Napoleonic Wars. It is square rather than round, unlike the traditional Martello tower. This tower is known locally as the Gabhla Fhranca ("French Tower") or the Napoleonic Tower. It is marked on an 1838 Ordnance Survey chart and denoted "Signal Tower", suggesting it was used with a series of other stations for communication. The tower's position offers a view of the sea both to the north and south of the island and is therefore well-suited for that purpose. By the 1830s the tower was described as a "watch-house of the coast-guard."

=== Elsewhere ===
==== Antigua and Barbuda ====
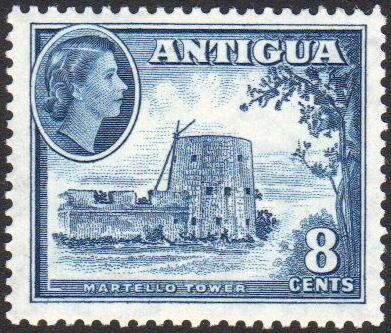
A 1953 stamp of Antigua showing the Martello Tower in Barbuda.

The British originally constructed River Fort Martello Tower in the early 19th century, on the site of a previous fort (presumed to have been built by the Spanish) to guard nearby River Landing, which was Barbuda's original quay. Confusion with the previous fort presumably explains the claims made in Barbudan tourism publications that this was the World's first, and is its oldest, Martello tower, built in 1745. The tower is located on the south coast of the island, a mile or so from River Landing and some seven miles south of the island's main village of Codrington. The tower is 56 feet high, has a raised gun platform and extremely thick walls, but is missing the floors. It the first such tower constructed in the Caribbean, was built in 1745 by Sir William Codrington, and was designed by Commodore Charles Knowles RN, later Admiral Sir Charles Knowles Bt, who was then commanding the Leeward Islands station.

It is attached to what remains of the pre-existing fort. The tower mounted three cannon, and in all the fort mounted ten cannons, none of which remain. The tower is the highest building on Barbuda and serves as a daymark from land or sea. Today the fort is a popular location for weddings.

==== Australia ====
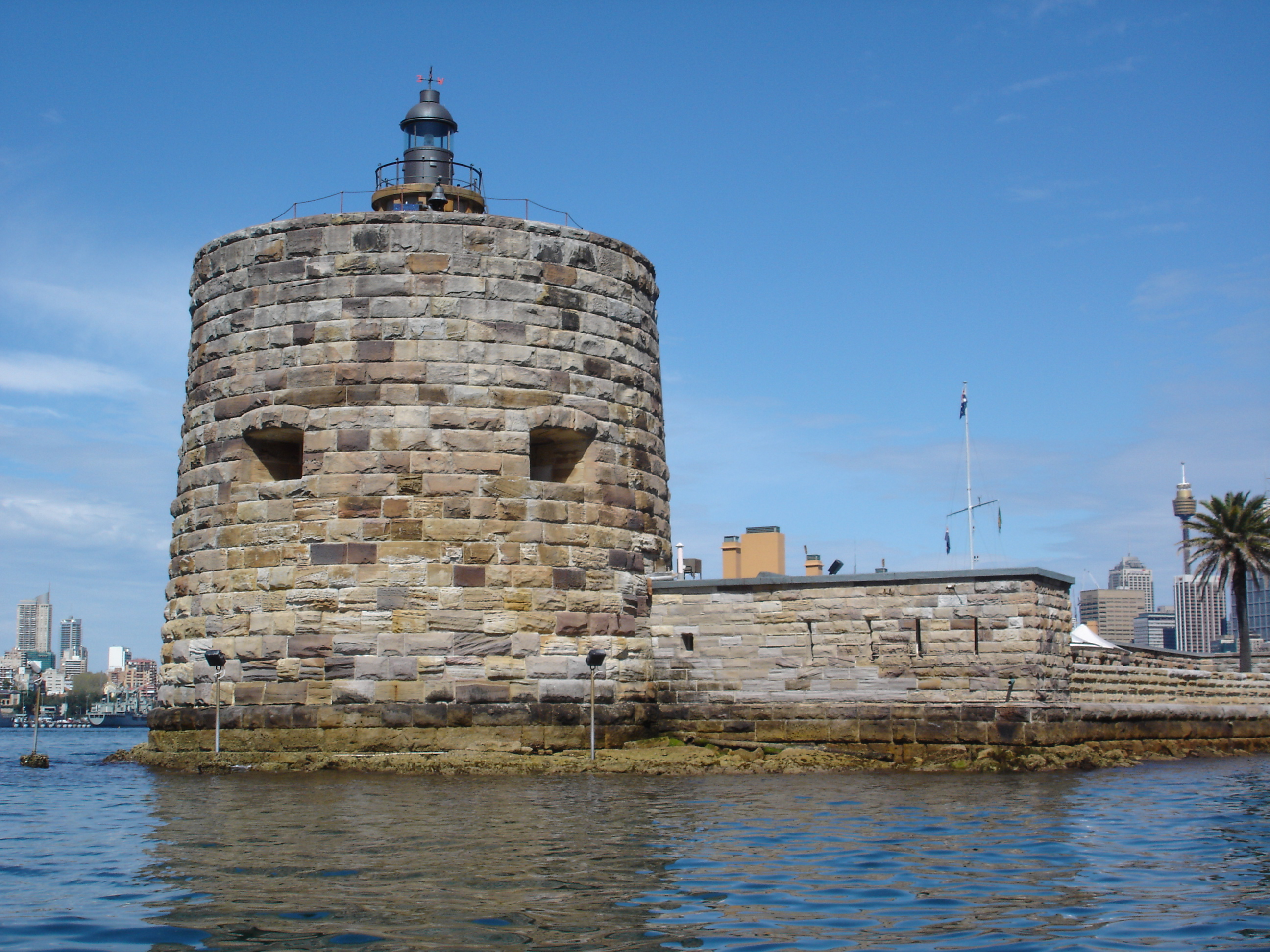
Fort Denison, Sydney Harbour.

The last Martello tower built in the British Empire is said to be that which composes a part of the larger Fort Denison, built during the late 18th and early 19th centuries on Pinchgut Island, a small island in Sydney Harbour, New South Wales. It is the only Martello tower to have been built in Australia.

Fortification of the island began in 1841, but was not completed. The construction had begun following an 1839 night-time incursion into Sydney Harbour by two American warships. Concern with the threat of foreign attack had caused the government to review the harbour's inner defences, which were found to be inadequate, and the establishment of a fort was recommended to help protect Sydney Harbour from attack by foreign vessels. Construction resumed in 1855 to provide Sydney with protection against the threat of a naval attack by the Russians during the Crimean War of the 1850s. However, construction was completed only in 1857, well after the war had ended. Fort Denison is well preserved and is now a popular tourist attraction.

==== Bermuda ====
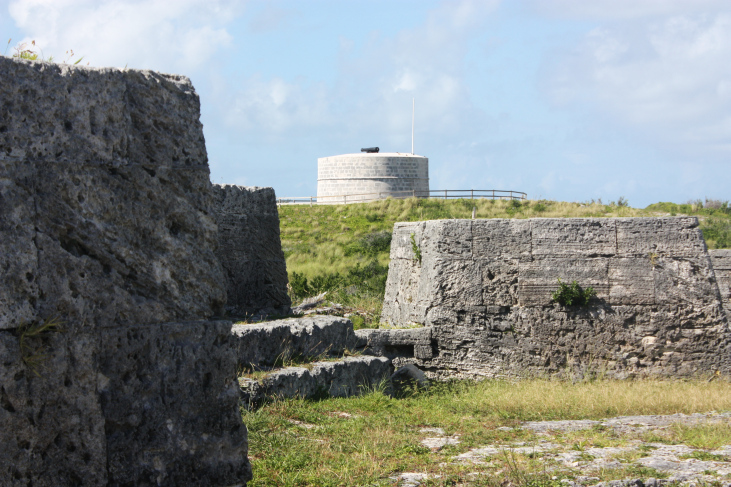
The Martello tower at Ferry Reach, Bermuda (1822) (background), contrasts with the Ferry Island Fort (1790s) (foreground).

There is a Martello tower located at Ferry Reach in St George's Parish, in the British Imperial fortress colony of Bermuda. The tower is the third fortification on the site. Major Thomas Blanshard built it of Bermuda limestone between 1822 and 1823. The tower shows the effect of thirty years of evolution on the design of coastal fortifications, between the 1790s and 1822. The earlier Ferry Island Fort nearby had multiple guns arrayed to cover the water westward, while the Martello tower used a single gun with 360° traverse to cover all of the surrounding area.

Like its predecessors in the UK, it has an ovoid footprint with the thickness of its walls ranging from 2.5 to 3.5 metres (9 to 11 ft). It is surrounded by a dry moat. The tower's purpose was to defend the Ferry Reach Channel and so impede any attack on St. George's Island from the main island of Bermuda, and attacking vessels from slipping through Castle Harbour and the channel between Ferry Reach and Coney Island. The main channel by which vessels reach most parts of Bermuda west of St. George's, including the Royal Naval Dockyard, on Ireland, the Great Sound, Hamilton Harbour, The Flatts, Murray's Anchorage, and other important sites, carries them around the east ends of St. David's and St. George's Islands, where the coastal artillery was always most heavily concentrated. Two more Martello towers to protect the Dockyard were planned, but never built.

The tower was restored in 2008 and an 18-pounder cannon brought from Fort St. Catherine was mounted on top. The site is open to the public from 10 a.m. to 2 p.m. Monday to Friday in the summer and in the winter by appointment only, by calling the Parks Department. It is part of the Bermuda Railway Trail.

==== British Virgin Islands ====
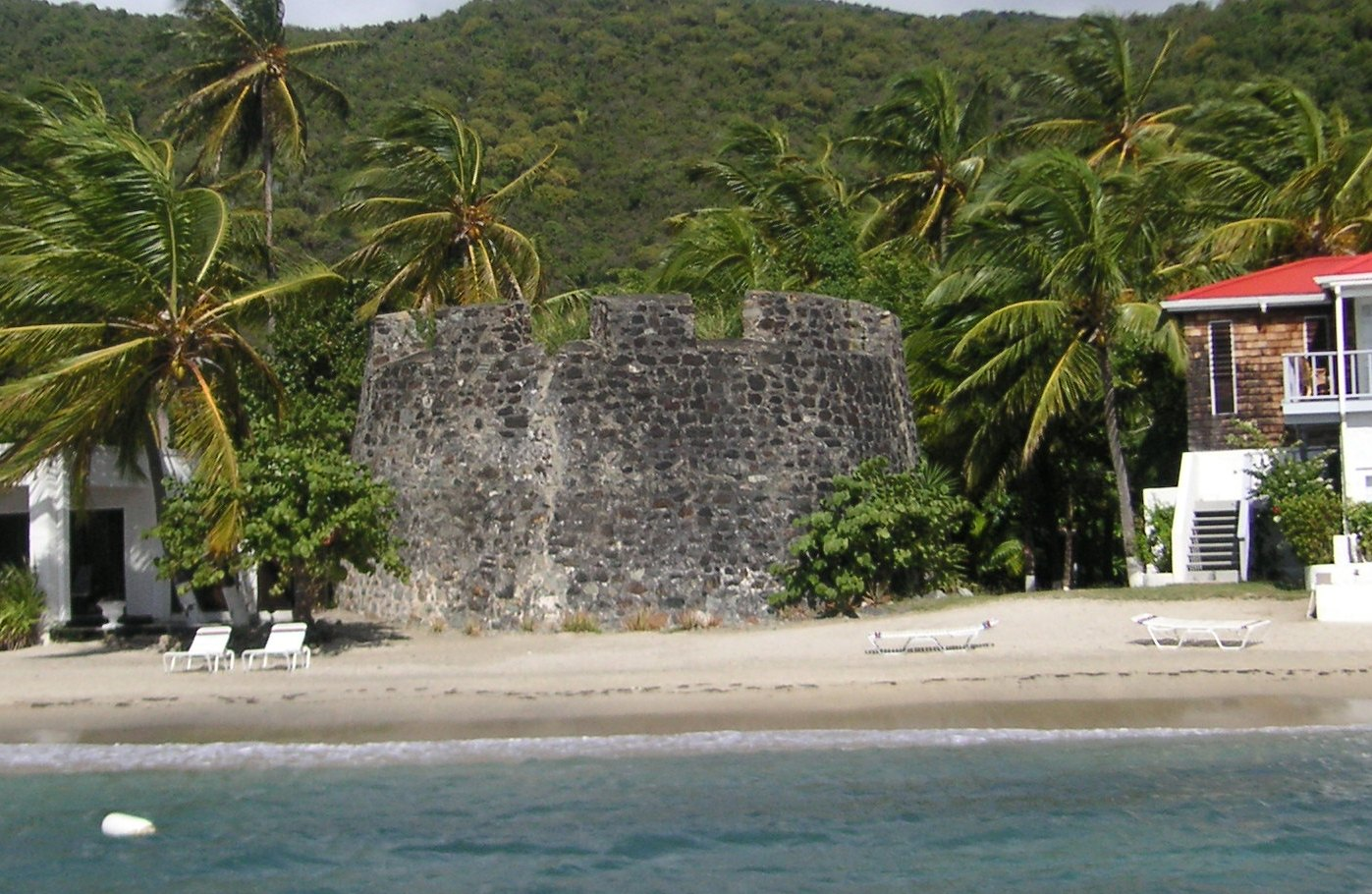
Fort Recovery, in the British Virgin Islands.

When the British rebuilt Fort Recovery on the west end of Tortola they added a Martello tower.

==== Canada ====
Nine of the fourteen Martello towers built in Canada still survive. (In addition, the existing fortifications at Fort Henry received two thin towers between 1845 and 1848. However, these are dry ditch defence towers, rather than true Martello towers.) A common characteristic of Canadian Martello towers was removable cone-shaped roofs to protect against snow. Today, many of the restored towers have permanent roof additions – for ease of upkeep, not historical accuracy.

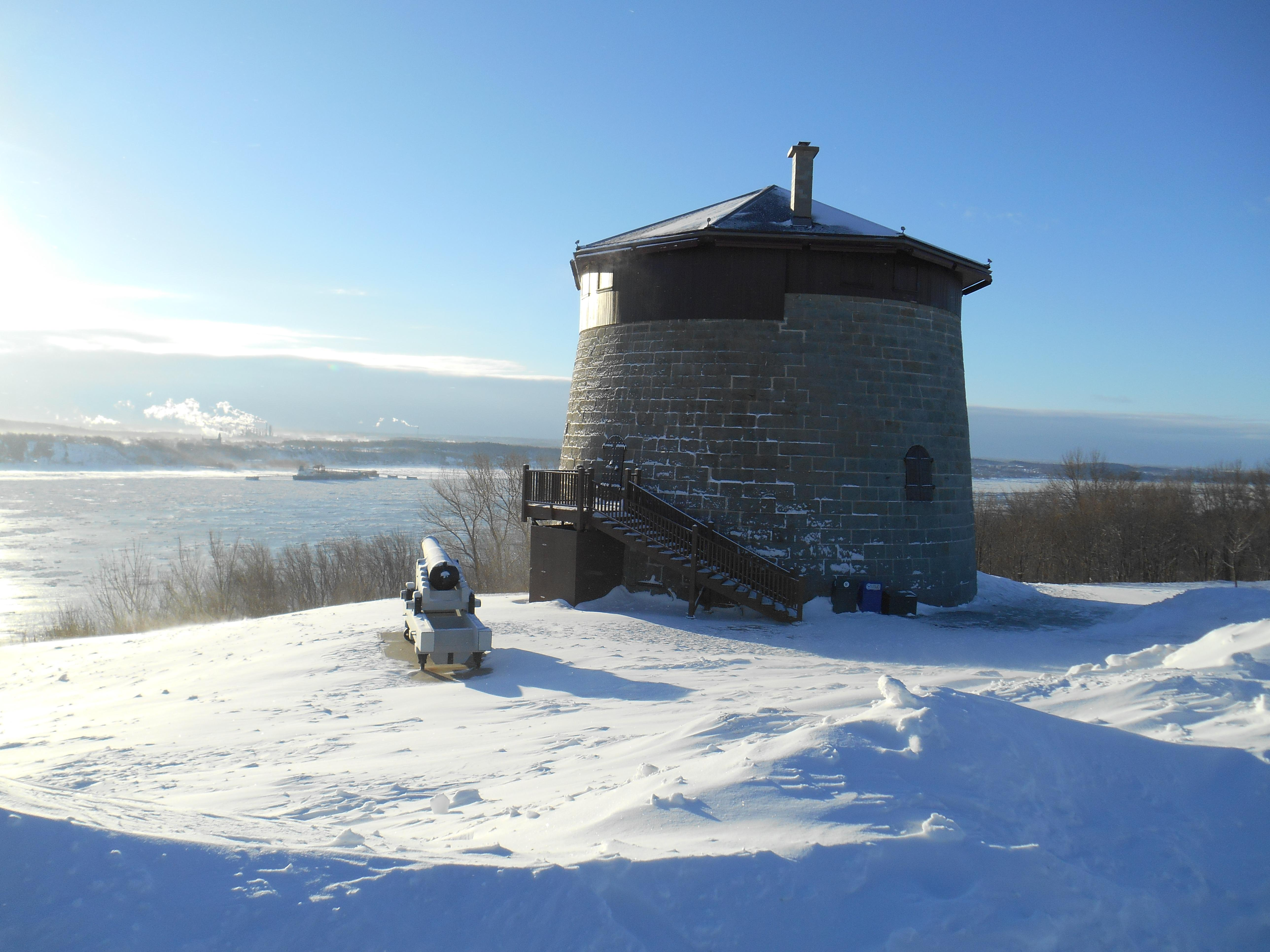
Martello tower no. 1, Quebec City

Quebec City originally had four Martello towers. Tower No. 1 stands on the Plains of Abraham, overlooking the St Lawrence River. It has been restored as a museum and can be visited during the summer months. Tower no. 2 stands close nearby and currently hosts activities for private groups. Tower No. 3 was demolished in 1905 after being used as a residence. The McKenzie Memorial Building of Jeffery Hale Hospital now occupies the site. The fourth surviving Martello Tower in Quebec, No. 4, is located in a residential area on the north side of the Upper City overlooking Lower Town. It is now used as an escape game tourist activity by The National Battlefields Commission.

Halifax, Nova Scotia, had five towers, the oldest of which, the Prince of Wales Tower located in Point Pleasant Park, is the oldest Martello-style tower in North America. It was built in 1796 and was used as a redoubt and a powder magazine. Restored, it is now a National Heritage site. The Duke of York Martello Tower was built in 1798 at York Redoubt. Its lower level still stands, though it has been boarded up for conservation purposes. The Duke of Clarence Martello Tower stood on the Dartmouth shore. Sherbrooke Martello Tower stood opposite York Redoubt on McNabs Island; it was demolished in 1944 and replaced by a concrete lighthouse at Maughers Beach. Another Martello tower stood on Georges Island.

Four Martello towers were built at Kingston, Ontario to defend its harbour and naval shipyards in response to the Oregon Crisis. Their builders intended for the towers to serve as redoubts against marine attacks. Murney Tower and the tower at Point Frederick (at the Royal Military College of Canada) are now museums that are open during the summer.

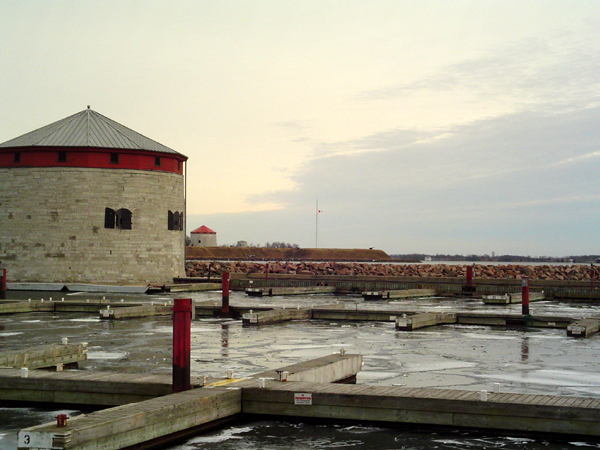
Line of defence: three Martello towers Fort Frederick, Shoal Tower, and Cathcart Tower in Kingston, Ontario

Fort Frederick has the most elaborate defences as it includes earthen ramparts and a limestone curtain wall. The Shoal Tower, the only tower completely surrounded by water, stands in Kingston's Confederation Basin. Since 2005, it is open to the public as part of Doors Open Ontario for one day only in June each year. Cathcart Tower, the fourth tower, stands unused on Cedar Island near Point Henry.

Carleton Martello Tower, overlooking the harbour of Saint John, New Brunswick, is now a museum and a National Historic Site.

The Canadian Press reported on 16 April 2006 that the Canadian military has named a Forward Operating Base (FOB) in Afghanistan FOB Martello. The logo of the International Hockey Hall of Fame and Museum in Kingston, Ontario, features a Martello tower. Since the amalgamation of the Township of Kingston in 2000, the city's flag has also borne a Martello tower.

==== Guernsey ====
There are three similar Martello towers in Guernsey, all built in 1804: Fort Grey, Fort Hommet and Fort Saumarez.

In addition, there are a number of earlier towers in Guernsey (the Guernsey loophole towers), that many people refer to as Martello towers, though they are not Martellos. They were built in the late 18th century, i.e., before the Martellos, and differ from them in a number of ways. One may think of them as precursors, like the Genoese towers they resemble.

Lastly, Bréhon Tower, built in 1856, is an oval tower that represents the final evolution of the Martello tower.

==== India ====
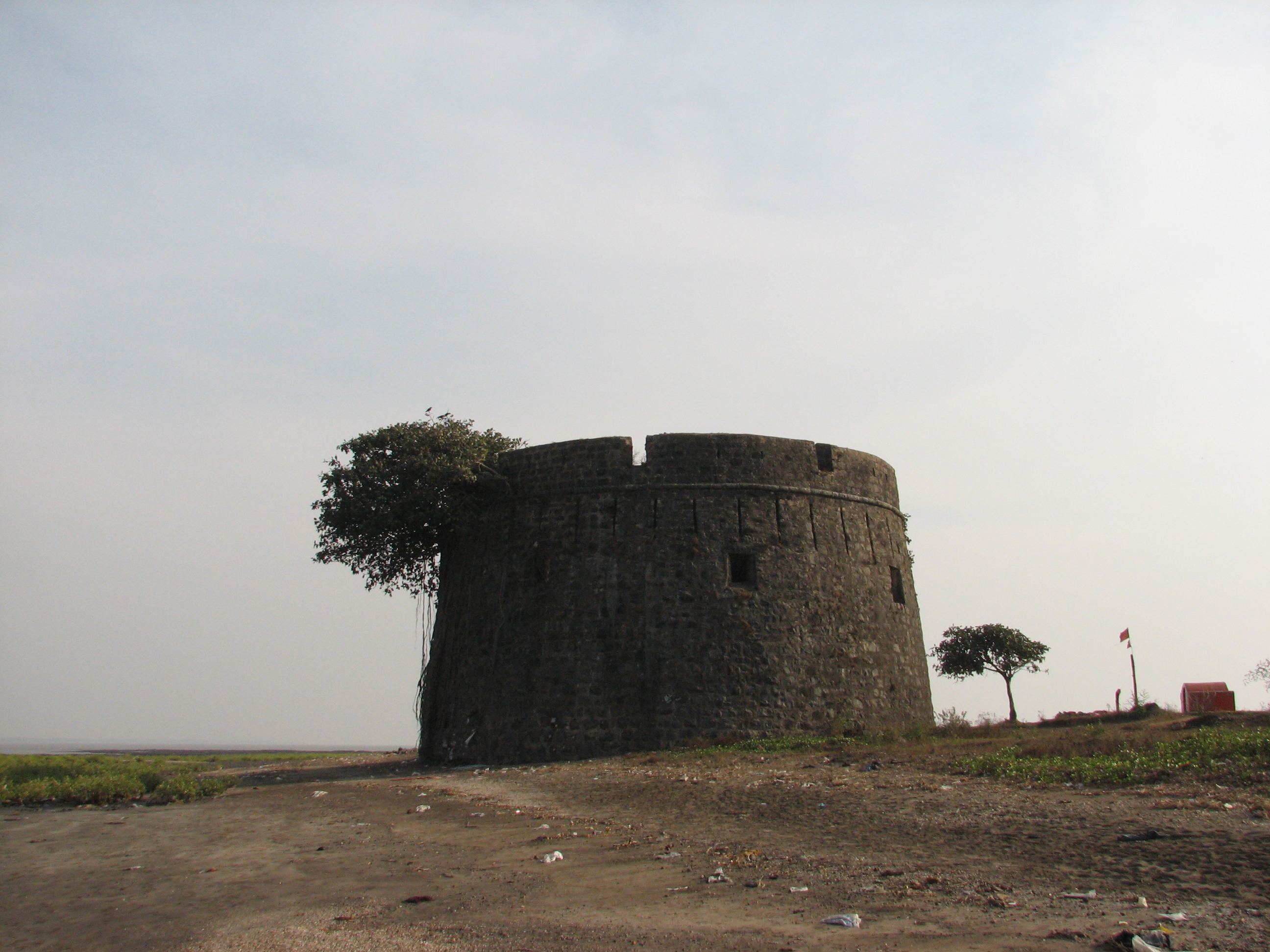
Portuguese Martello tower at Arnala, India

Although European in origin, a primitive form of Martello tower had existed in Punjab by the time it was conquered by the East India Company. There is a Martello Tower that the Portuguese built at the southern tip of the island where the Arnala fort stands. The Portuguese are said to have built many of these towers, but Arnala's is the best surviving specimen. After the Indian Rebellion of 1857, the British erected Martello towers at the British Residency in Hyderabad, which were demolished in 1954. An earlier example of such is the one found in Pakur, a town in the state of Jharakhand. This tower was built in 1856 by Sub District Officer Sir Martin with view to protect the British Raj from the Santhals. It was an important position for the British forces watching fighting the rebellion of the Santhals. This example is reported to still be in good condition, but decaying due to a lack of maintenance.

==== Indonesia ====
The 1883 eruption of Krakatoa caused a tsunami that damaged Menara Martello, which the Dutch colonial government of the East Indies built in 1850 on Bidadari Island (Pulau Bidadari), one of the Thousand Islands (Kepulauan Seribu), as part of a set of fortifications built between 1850 and 1852 that protected the approaches to Batavia. Photos suggest that Martello Menara was not a true Martello, but rather a circular fort. The tower was operational until 1878, when it became a storage site, and was abandoned in 1908. Bidadari Island was also known as Pulau Sakit (Sick Island) as it housed a leper colony during the 17th century. More recently, the island came to be called "Angel Island", to honour the leprosarium that had been there.

Other towers were built at Onrust, Kuiper (Cipir), and Kerkhof (Kelor) islands. All four were demolished in part or in whole after the advent of rifled guns made them obsolete.

==== Italy ====
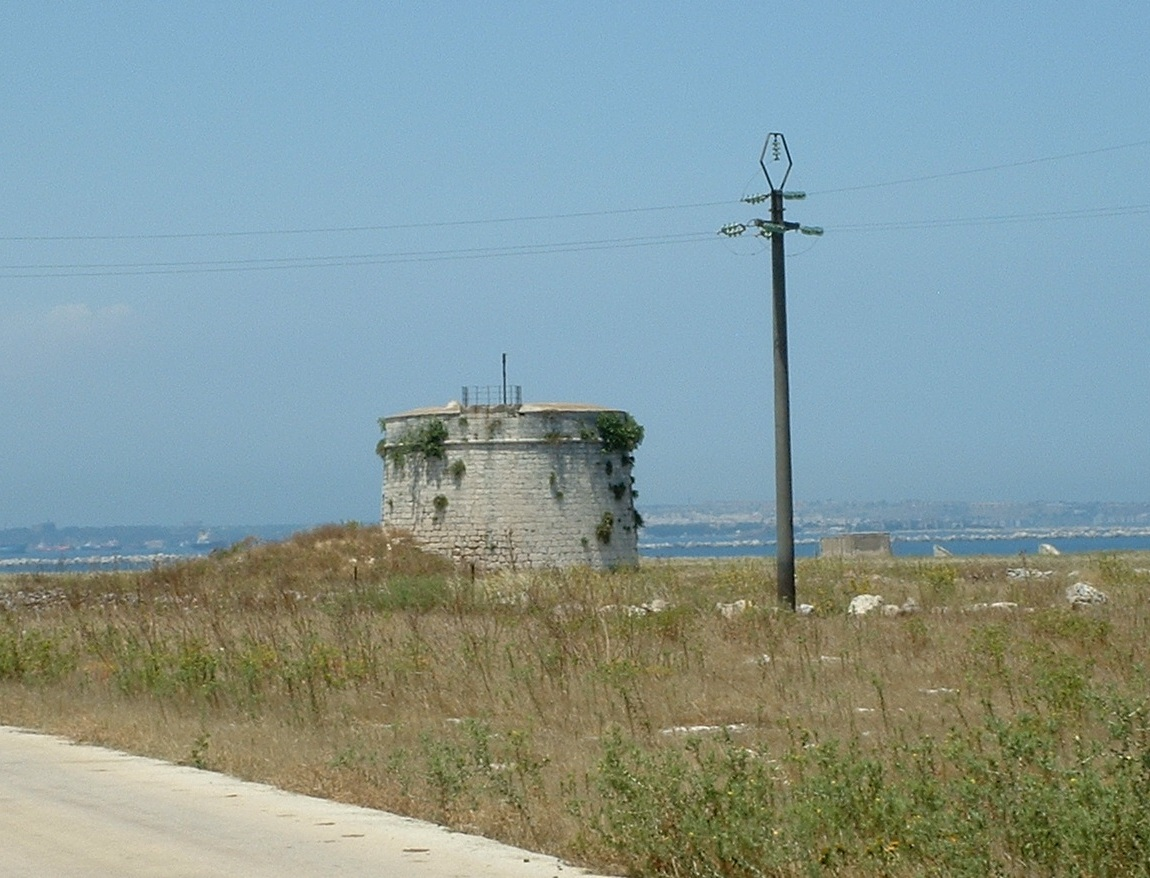
Magnisi tower at Priolo Gargallo.

At the beginning of the nineteenth century, during the British "Protectorate" of Sicily after the escape of the Bourbons from Naples, Sicily began to build towers to resist an invasion by Napoleon's armies led by Joachim Murat. The new higher rate of fire of ships' guns led to the choice of the Martello tower as the model.

The Sicilian Martello towers were built around 1810. The estimate rests on the historical context and on the descriptions of the topographer W.H. Smyth, who carried out his research in 1814 and 1815. Of the seven towers built in Sicily, only four remain. One is the Mazzone Tower (or the British Fort) at Faro Point, Messina. The second is the Magnisi tower at Priolo Gargallo, Syracuse. The Italian Navy used this tower as an observation post during the Second World War. Third is the Cariddi tower at Ganzirri in Messina. Lastly, the fourth tower is situated on a rocky outcrop overlooking the sea from where it can defend the Castello Maniace in Syracuse.

==== Jamaica ====
There is a Martello tower located at what was Fort Nugent. In 1709, the Spanish slave agent in Jamaica, James Castillo, built a fort in Harbour View, to guard his home against attack. An English Governor, George Nugent, later strengthened the fort to guard the eastern entrance of the city of Kingston Harbour. The tower was probably built between 1808 and 1811, at a reported cost of £12,000.

==== Japan ====
- Nishinomiya Battery
- Wadamisaki Battery

==== Jersey ====
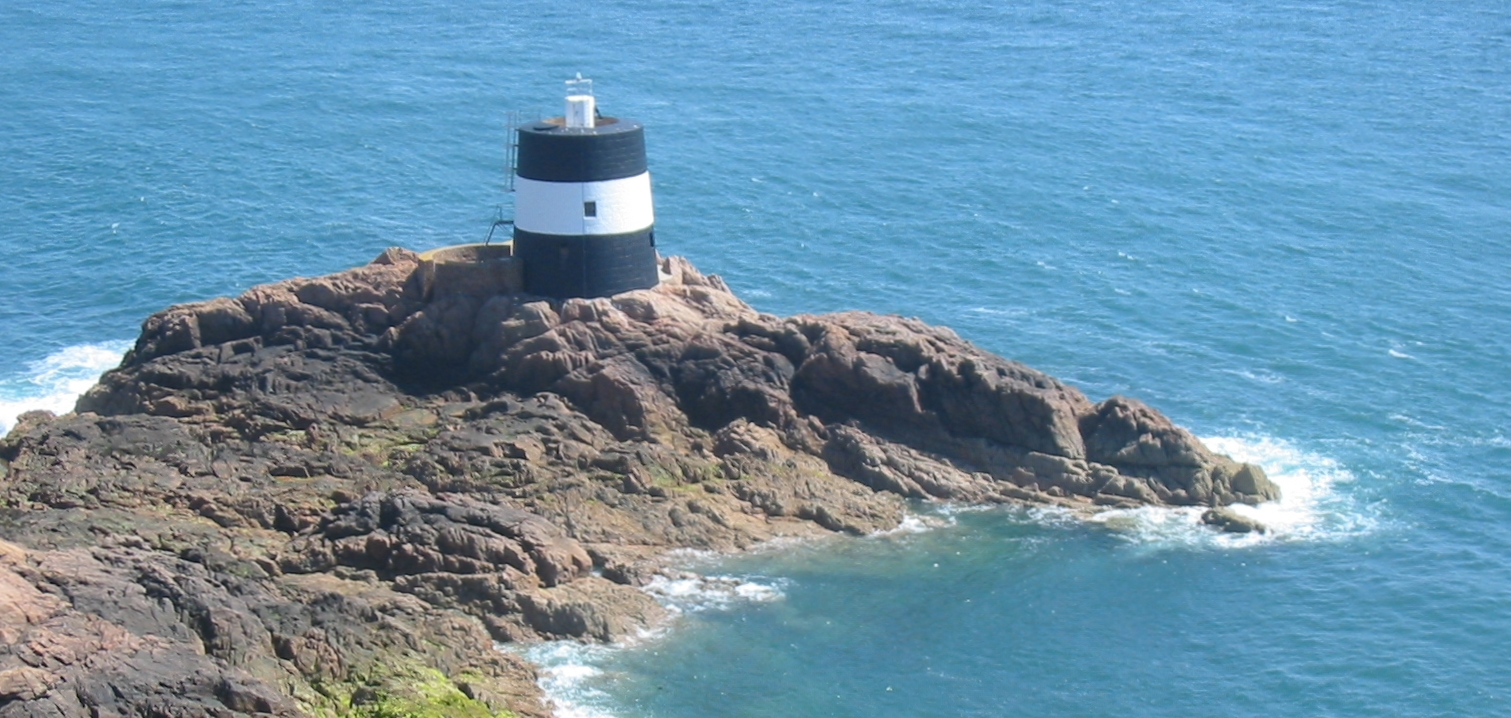
La Tour de Vinde, Saint Brélade, Jersey

The British built eight true Martello towers in Jersey, three between 1808 and 1814, and five between 1834 and 1837, one of which, L'Etacq, the German occupation forces destroyed during World War II. The three original towers are:

- Icho Tower (1811)
- Portelet Tower (1808)
- La Tour de Vinde (AKA Noirmont; 1808–1814)

The four surviving, later towers are:

- Lewis Tower (AKA St Ouen 1; 1835)
- Kempt Tower (AKA St Ouen 2; 1834)
- La Collette Tower – Absorbed into the 19th-century artificers' barracks and workshops
- Victoria Tower (1837)

In addition, there are a number of towers in Jersey (the Jersey Round Towers), that are frequently referred to as Martello towers, though they are not Martellos. They were built in the late 18th century, i.e., before the Martellos, and differ from them in a number of ways. One may think of them as precursors, like the Genoese towers they resemble.

==== Malta ====
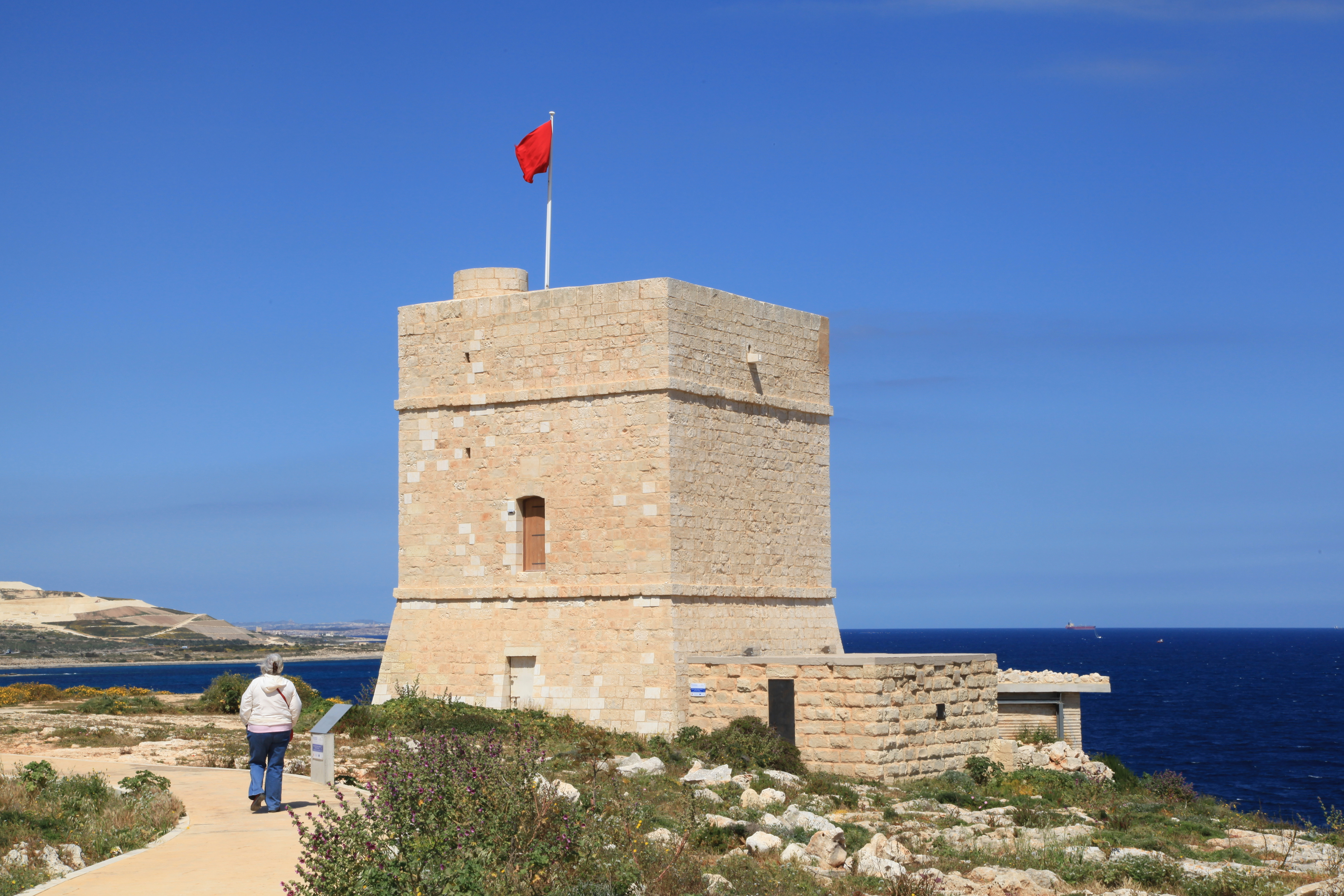
Madliena Tower (not a true Martello Tower but sometimes considered as such).

The British never built any true Martello Towers in Malta. However, Madliena Tower, which was one of thirteen De Redin towers built in Malta in 1658–1659, began to be used as if it was a Martello Tower and it is sometimes considered as such. Various modifications were made, including mounting a 64-pound rifled muzzle loading (RML) gun on the roof for coastal defence. From the late 19th century onwards it defended part of the Victoria Lines. The tower remained in use until World War II. It still stands today, despite having some minor modifications to its original structure, and it was recently restored.

==== Mauritius ====
The British built five Martello Towers between 1832 and 1835 at Grand River North West (2), Black River (2), and Port Louis (1), of which three survive. One tower, named Cunningham Tower after Lieutenant-Colonel Cunningham, the commanding Royal Engineer, was constructed as part of Fort George at the northern side of the entrance to Port Louis harbour. Two towers were built at Grand River North West; on the south-west side of the river bay the tower was built at Pointe aux Sables whilst Fort Victoria was built covering the north-eastern flank. The remaining two were built to support existing batteries, which were also improved, at the mouth of the Black River; one to the north at La Preneuse and the other south of Grande-Rivière-Noire at Batterie de l'Harmonie. Cunningham Tower disappeared after 1914. The Tower at Fort Victoria was last mentioned in 1880. In 1865, the Mauritius Almanac and Civil Service Register listed "Two Artillery Men, at 1s each per diem", for the towers at Fort George and Grand River. The Friends of the Environment have restored one Martello tower near the La Preneuse public beach, in the Rive Noire/Black River district. The Friends operate it as a museum for visitors. The original entrance to the tower is raised above ground but a new entrance has been constructed at ground level. The other tower in Rive Noire/Black River district [L'Harmonie] still exists but has remained neglected for many years. The other existing tower is at Pointe aux Sables, Grand River North West.

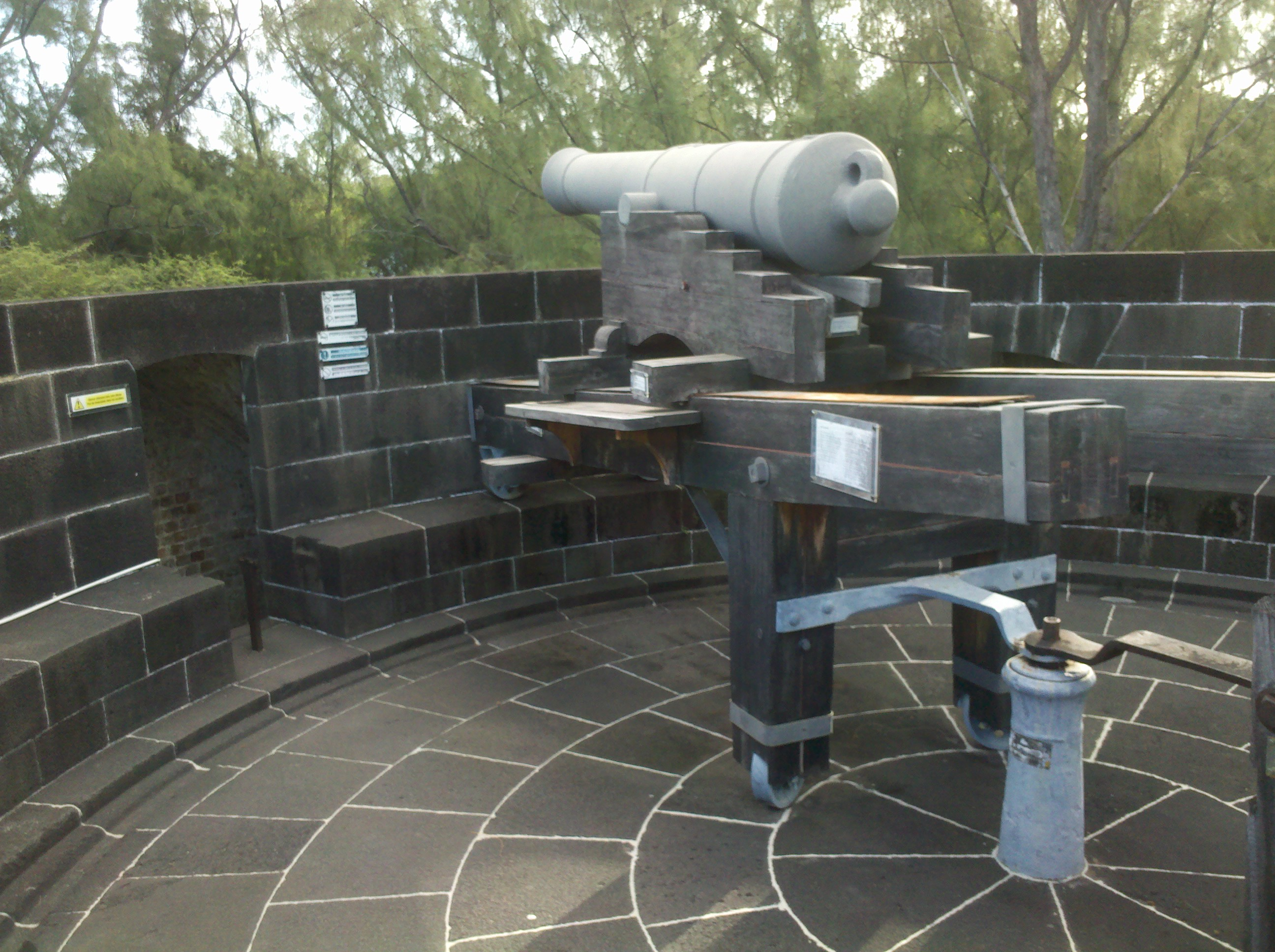
Canon on Martello tower in La Preneuse, Black River, Mauritius

==== Sierra Leone ====
A Martello tower was built on Tower Hill at Freetown, Sierra Leone in 1805 to defend the port from attacks by the Temne people. It was significantly modified in 1870 when it was truncated to allow the installation of a water tank to supply Government House (Fort Thornton) with water. The tower has now been incorporated into Sierra Leone's Parliament Buildings.

==== South Africa ====
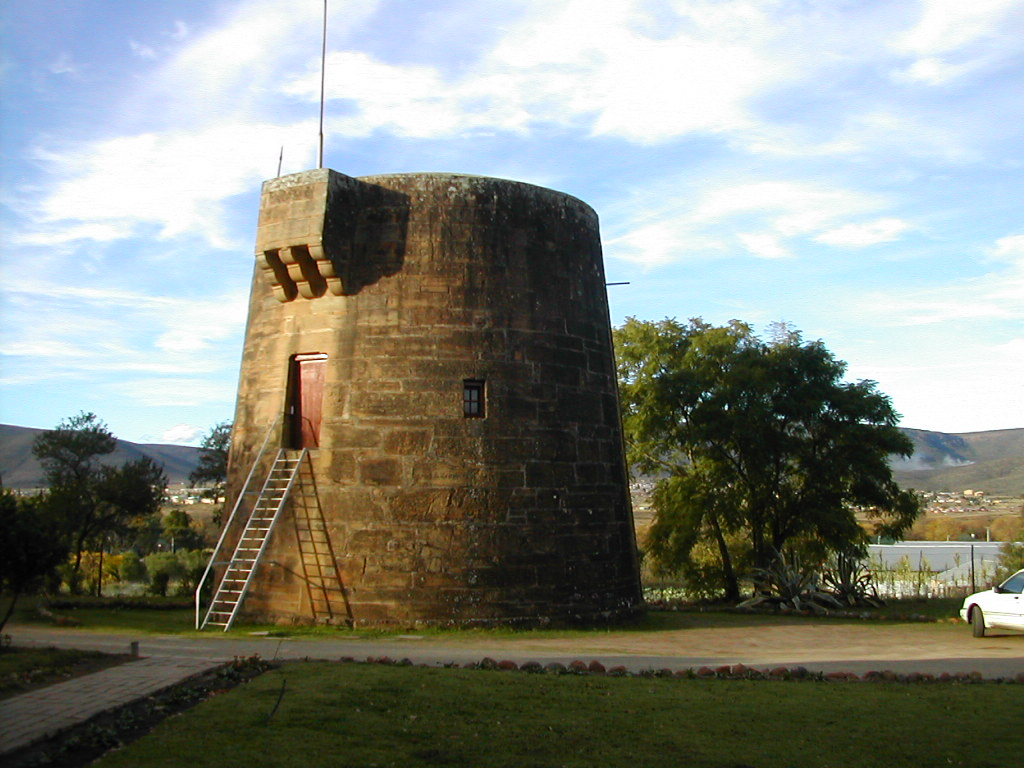
Martello tower at Fort Beaufort

The British built three Martello towers in South Africa, one at Simon's Town Naval base near Cape Town, one at Cape Town, and the third at Fort Beaufort. The tower at Simon's Town and Cape Town were both built in 1795. The tower at Cape Town was demolished over 100 years ago, but the tower at Simon's Town now is sometimes claimed as the oldest Martello in the world. It is arguable as to whether one should properly call it a Martello Tower.

That said, Vice Admiral George Elphinstone, who commanded the force that captured the colony and then served briefly as its governor, had served with the Mediterranean fleet off Corsica in 1794. The British built the tower at Fort Beaufort in 1837, and it is probably the only example of an inland Martello tower.

==== Spain ====
During the last period of British occupation (1798–1802) of Menorca, Sir Charles Stuart, the British governor, ordered Engineer Captain Robert D'Arcy to build some 12 Martello towers along the coast. These, when added to the three Spanish towers already in place, gave Menorca 15 towers.

The British built five towers to protect Mahón: Phillipet on Lazareto Island, Cala Taulera (St. Clair) and Los Freus (Erskine) on the peninsula of La Mola, Stuart's Tower, and a tower on the Punta de Sant Carlos, which the Spanish destroyed when they regained possession of Menorca. To the northwest of Mahón the British built two more towers, Sa Torreta and Sa Mezquita.

One tower, the Princess Tower, or the Erskine Tower, was incorporated into the Fortress of Isabel II, built between 1850 and 1875. The tower was converted to a powder magazine, which led to its destruction in 1958, when lightning struck the tower. The explosion destroyed the tower, blowing out large sections of its walls.

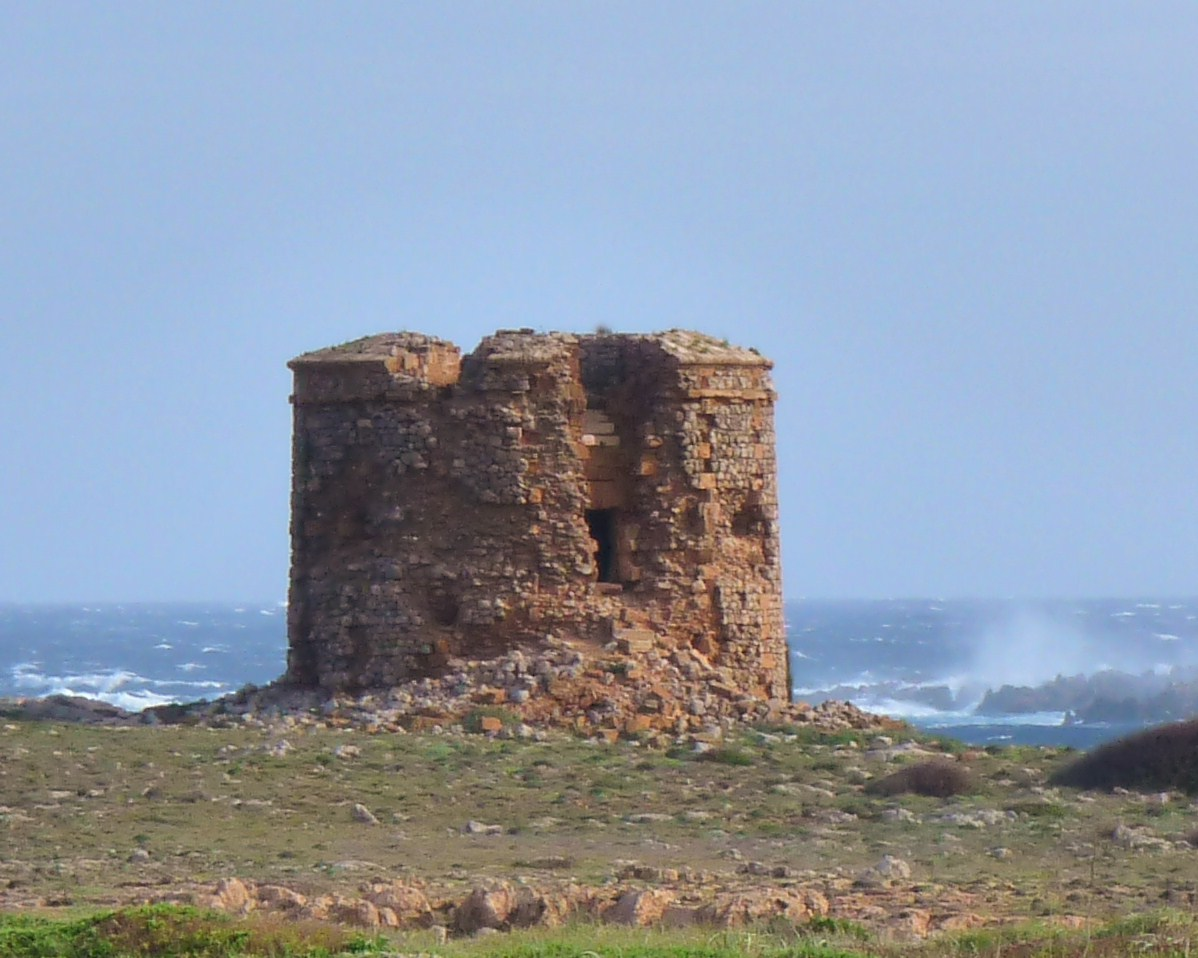
Martello tower at Cap Cavalleria, Menorca.

The British erected Stuart's Tower in 1798 on Turks Hill or Hangman's Hill to the south of the port of Mahón at San Esteban or Saint Stephen's bay on the southern side of the Fortress of San Felipe. In 1756 and again in 1781, batteries on the hill had supported successful attacks on the Fortress. The tower was built both to secure the hill and protect the entrance to the bay. The tower's name was later changed to Torre d'en Penjat, or Hangman's Tower.

To protect the harbour of Fornells, the British built a tower on the rocky headland overlooking the harbour's mouth, and a small tower on the island of Sargantana. They complemented these two towers with two more small towers nearby, one at Sa Nitsa and one at Addaya.

Lastly, the British built one tower at Santandria to protect the old capital of Ciutadella.

In addition to the 12 towers that they built, the British made use of three towers that the Spanish had built earlier. In 1781, Captain Francisco Fernandez de Angulo had built towers south of Port Mahon at Punta Prima and Alcufar, based on the design of those that the Spanish had built in Gando, Gran Canaria, in 1740. At Ciutadella the British used the St. Nicholas's Tower, built in 1690. The Treaty of Amiens returned Menorca to Spain in 1802. Around 1804, the Spanish built a tower at Punta Na Radona to protect the beach at Son Bou, Menorca. In 1808, Captain Lord Cochrane, commanding the 38-gun fifth-rate frigate HMS Imperieuse, sent ashore a landing party that destroyed the unarmed tower. (Frederick Marryat, later a naval captain and author, was serving as a midshipman aboard Imperieuse at the time.) This fort has 17 walls.

There are also four towers on the island of Formentera, and one on the nearby island of S'Empalmador (38°47′5.28″N 1°25′5.01″E).

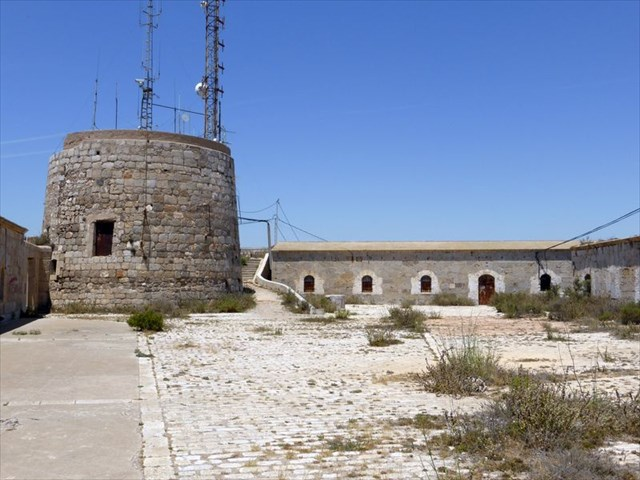
Martello tower at Castle of San Julian, Cartagena de Levante

Another tower was erected by English troops stationed in the fortress of Cartagena, during the Peninsular War. The tower was erected in the center of the 1799 fort, in mount St. Julian, dominating port and mouth. In the summer of 1812 English engineers destroyed the fort and erected a tower:

... the British are working on opening a path from the east coast to the post on Mount St. Julian, where they try to build a six-piece battery held in a tower 24 feet in diameter.

— Report by Second Lieutenant Navarro, March 10, 1813.

Is reduced to a well-built coast tower, but only mounts and is capable of a rotating gun ... The tower contains two floors and the platform. The ground floor is for the warehouse and spare part. The main one for accommodation, and in this one is the door for ladder of hand, and two spans that, besides serving for ventilation, are arranged to receive small caliber guns ... The platform mounts a rotating gun and has a small bench for the fire of rifle. Under the lower floor there is a cistern.

— Plano de la plaza de Cartagena, Tebar, Echevarria, Pajares, 1855

The later constructions that gave rise to the present fortress of San Julián is still in good condition and is used as a base for telephone aerials and antennas. The interior, which is only accessible to technicians, is supposedly well preserved.

==== Saint Helena ====
There is a Martello tower at Saint Helena that was incorporated into High Knoll Fort. The tower was very similar in design to the tower at Simon's Town, with a diameter of about 45 ft (14 m) and a height of approximately 20 ft (6.1 m).

==== Sri Lanka ====
Sri Lanka has one Martello tower, located at Hambantota on the south coast, which was restored in 1999. This tower may have been involved in repelling a French attack though there is nothing more than circumstantial support for the notion. British engineers commenced work on three towers to protect Trincomalee but never completed them.

==== United States ====
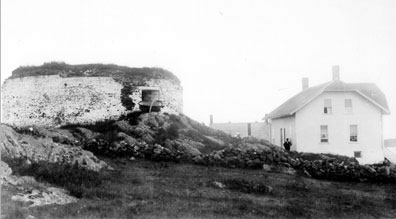
Ruined Martello tower at New Castle, New Hampshire, overlooking Portsmouth harbour in the late 19th century

The United States government built several Martello towers at locations along the eastern seaboard. Two are at Key West, Florida; others were built at the harbours of Portsmouth, New Hampshire, Charleston, South Carolina and New York City. Two more Martello towers stood at Tybee Island, Georgia and Bayou Dupre, Louisiana.

41st Infantry Coat of arms with a Martello Tower

Although the Americans copied the design from the towers the British erected in Canada, the American Martello towers differed in some significant respects from the British. The Martello tower built at Tybee Island, Georgia was constructed around 1815 utilising wood and tabby concrete, a common local building material at the time, instead of the brick or stone that the British towers used. Also, unlike the British towers, the Tybee tower featured gun loops on the garrison floor that enabled muskets to be fired through the walls. It was never tested in battle and by the time of the American Civil War was in a state of disrepair. Its unfamiliar design confused local writers, who often said that the Spanish had built the tower when Georgia was Spain's colony.

The Key West towers, though the locals refer to them as Martellos, were square instead of round and had thin walls with long gun loops. In addition, a curtain wall of heavy guns encircled the Key West towers making them, effectively, keeps instead of standalone towers.

A Martello tower figures in the arms of the 41st Infantry Regiment of the United States Army.

=== List of Martello towers outside Great Britain ===
Country	Location	Tower name	Built	Current status
Australia	Sydney	Fort Denison	1856	Museum, harbour light station
Barbuda	Near Palmetto Point	River Fort Martello Tower		
Bermuda	Ferry Reach		1823–1828	Can be visited
British Virgin Islands	Tortola	Fort Recovery		Private (hotel)
Canada	Point Pleasant Park, Nova Scotia	Prince of Wales's Tower	1796	Open to the public
Canada	Halifax, Nova Scotia	Duke of York's Tower	c.1798	Lower levels still exist. Site partially boarded off, can be visited
Canada	Halifax, Nova Scotia	Duke of Clarence's Tower	c.1798	Demolished prior to 1900
Canada	Kingston, Ontario	Fort Frederick	1846/07	Museum
Canada	Kingston, Ontario	Murney Tower	1846	Museum
Canada	Kingston, Ontario	Shoal Tower	1846	Closed to the public
Canada	Kingston, Ontario	Cathcart Tower	1846	Closed to the public
Canada	Quebec City, Quebec	Tower #1	1808–1812	Museum
Canada	Quebec City, Quebec	Tower #2	1808–1812	Open for group activities through National Battlefields Commission
Canada	Quebec City, Quebec	Tower #3	1808–1812	Destroyed
Canada	Quebec City, Quebec	Tower #4	1808–1812	Tourist activity - Escape game
Canada	Saint John, New Brunswick	Carleton Martello Tower	1815	Museum
Croatia	Korčula	Forteca Korčula (Fort Wellington)	1813	Deserted, accessible to hikers
Guernsey	Saint Peter	Fort Grey	1804	Museum
Guernsey	Castel	Fort Hommet	1804	Interior dismantled, and more recently restored as a visitor attraction
Guernsey	Saint Peter	Fort Saumarez	1804	Privately owned
India	Arnala Island	Hanumant Bastion	c. 1530s	Deserted and dilapidated
Ireland	Achill Island	Gabhla Fhranca	c. 1803–1815	Partially collapsed but accessible to hikers
Ireland	Aughinish	Aughinish Tower	1811	Private residence
Ireland	Banagher	Meelick Martello Tower		Private residence
Ireland	Drogheda	Millmount Fort	c. 1808	Extant
Ireland	Balbriggan	North No. 12	1804–05	Extant
Ireland	Skerries, Red Island	North No. 11	1804–05	Extant
Ireland	Skerries, Shenick Island	North No. 10	1804–05	Extant
Ireland	Drumanagh	North No. 9	1804–05	Extant
Ireland	Rush	North No. 8	1804–05	Extant
Ireland	Portrane, Tower Bay	North No. 7	1804–05	Private residence
Ireland	Donabate, Balcarrick	North No. 6	1804–05	Extant
Ireland	Malahide, Robswall	North No. 5, Hicks Tower	1804–05	Private residence
Ireland	Portmarnock, Carrickhill	North No. 4	1804–05	Private residence
Ireland	Ireland's Eye	North No. 3	1804–05	Extant
Ireland	Howth, Harbour Rd.	North No. 2	1804–05	Ye Olde Hurdy Gurdy Museum of Vintage Radio
Ireland	Sutton South	North No. 1	1804–05	Private residence
Ireland	Sandymount	South No. 16	1804–05	Extant
Ireland	Williamstown	South No. 15	1804–05	Extant
Ireland	Seapoint	South No. 14	1804–05	Restored. Exhibition on the history of Dublin's Martello Towers. Guided tours during the summer months
Ireland	Kingstown Harbour, West Pier	South No. 13	1804–05	Tower & battery, both demolished 1836 during extension of Dublin & Kingstown Railway
Ireland	Dún Laoghaire, site of present-day People's Park	South No. 12	1804–05	
Ireland	Sandycove	South No. 11, James Joyce's Martello tower	1804–05	James Joyce Tower and Museum
Ireland	Bulloch Harbour	South No. 10	1804–05	Private residence
Ireland	Dalkey Island	South No. 9	1804–05	Extant
Ireland	Killiney, south end of Strathmore Road	South No. 8	1804–05	Site of battery, not tower
Ireland	Killiney, Tara Hill	South No. 7	1804–05	Fully restored
Ireland	Killiney, beach	South No. 6, Enoch's Tower	1804–05	Private residence
Ireland	Shanganagh	South No. 5	1804–05	Site of battery, not tower
Ireland	Shanganagh, Mahera Point	South No. 4	1804–05	Lost to coastal erosion
Ireland	Bray, Corke Abbey	South No. 3	1804–05	Lost to coastal erosion
Ireland	Bray harbour	South No. 2	1804–05	Private residence
Ireland	Bray beach	South No. 1	1804–05	Demolished in 1884, when the Esplanade was constructed
Ireland	Ilnacullin			Tower and gardens open to public (access by boat from Glengarriff)
Ireland	Bere Island, Cloughland			
Ireland	Bere Island, Ardagh			
Ireland	Finavarra	Finavarra Tower	1816	Open to the public
Ireland	Ringaskiddy, Cork Harbour			
Ireland	Haulbowline Island, Cork Harbour			Museum, owned by the Irish Navy
Ireland	Fota Island, Cork Harbour	Monning Tower		
Ireland	Rossleague, Cobh			
Ireland	Belvelly, Cobh			Private residence
Ireland	Lough Swilly	Macamish Tower		
Ireland	Lough Foyle	Greencastle Tower		Extended to a fort, completed in 1812. Now a restaurant
Ireland	Lough Foyle	Magilligan Tower		Restored
Ireland	Loughshinny			
Ireland	Rathmullan			
Ireland	Ros a' Mhíl			
Italy	Messina	Cariddi's Tower or Tower of Ganzirri	1810?	Closed to the public
Italy		Mazzone's Tower or Tower of British Fort	1810?	
Italy	Priolo Gargallo	Torre di Magnisi	1810?	Can be visited
Italy	Syracuse	Castello Maniace	1810?	Open to the public
Jamaica	Kingston	Fort Nugent	1808–1811?	
Jersey		Icho Tower	1811	
Jersey	St Brelade	Portelet Tower	1808	The site is accessible at low tide.
Jersey	Saint Aubin	La Tour de Vinde	1808–10	Converted to lighthouse
Jersey	St Ouen	Lewis Tower	1835	Self-catering accommodation
Jersey	St Ouen	Kempt Tower	1834	Interpretation Centre for Les Mielles conservation area
Jersey		La Collette Tower	1811	Absorbed into 19th-century artificers' barracks and workshops
Jersey	St Martin	Victoria Tower	1837	National Trust for Jersey
Liberia	Monrovia	Fort Stockton	1822	Since August 1822 under construction, later named as coast battery Fort Hill
Malta	Madliena, Pembroke	Madliena Tower	1658	Intact, recently restored
Mauritius	Grand River North West	Pointe aux Sables	1832–35	Abandoned but no fences, entrance still on second storey
Mauritius	Grand River North West	Fort Victoria	1832–35	Last mentioned 1880
Mauritius	Grande-Rivière-Noire	L'Harmonie	1832–35	Ruined (now a national monument)
Mauritius	Black River	La Preneuse	1832–35	Museum
Mauritius	Fort George, Port Louis	Cunningham Tower	1832–35	Disappeared after 1914
Sierra Leone	Freetown	Tower Hill Martello Tower	1805	Part of Parliament Buildings
South Africa	Fort Beaufort		1839–46	
South Africa	Simon's Town		1795/06	At the Naval Base. Houses a small museum.
South Africa	Cape Town	Craig's Tower	1795/06	Demolished late 19th century
Sri Lanka	Hambantota		1801–03	
Trinidad and Tobago	Port of Spain	Fort Picton	1801	Abandoned by 1810
United States	Lake Borgne, Louisiana	Tower Dupre	1830?	Hexagonal; originally built on the shore, 150 ft (46 m) from the water, near Bayou Dupre's entrance to Lake Borgne; for much of the twentieth century was a private fishing camp; photo at Wikimedia Commons; destroyed in 2005 by Hurricane Katrina
United States	Charleston, South Carolina	Fort Johnson		
United States	Key West, Florida			East tower is a museum; west tower converted to a botanical garden; both open to the public
United States	New York Harbor			Destroyed
United States	Portsmouth, New Hampshire	Walbach Tower	1814	Incorporated into Fort Constitution; ruined
United States	Tybee Island, Georgia		1815	It served as an office of the Georgia Telegraph and Telephone Company and finally as the post office for Fort Screven. In 1913, the building was damaged in a fire and it was finally dismantled the following year to clear the field of fire for the guns of Fort Screven.

== See also ==
- Blockhouse
- Broch – Type of Iron Age drystone hollow-walled structure in Scotland
- Fortified tower

Lists:

- List of castles
- List of fortifications
- List of forts
