= River Camcor =

River in Ireland, tributary of the Little Brosna

Coordinates: 53°5′29″N 7°54′48″W

The River Camcor is a tributary of the Little Brosna River in central Ireland. It joins the Little Brosna in the Birr Castle Desmesne, Birr, County Offaly. The Little Brosna, in turn, joins the River Shannon close to Victoria Lock at Meelick.

== See also ==
- Rivers of Ireland
