= Meelick Martello Tower =

Tower in County Offaly, Ireland

- County Offaly
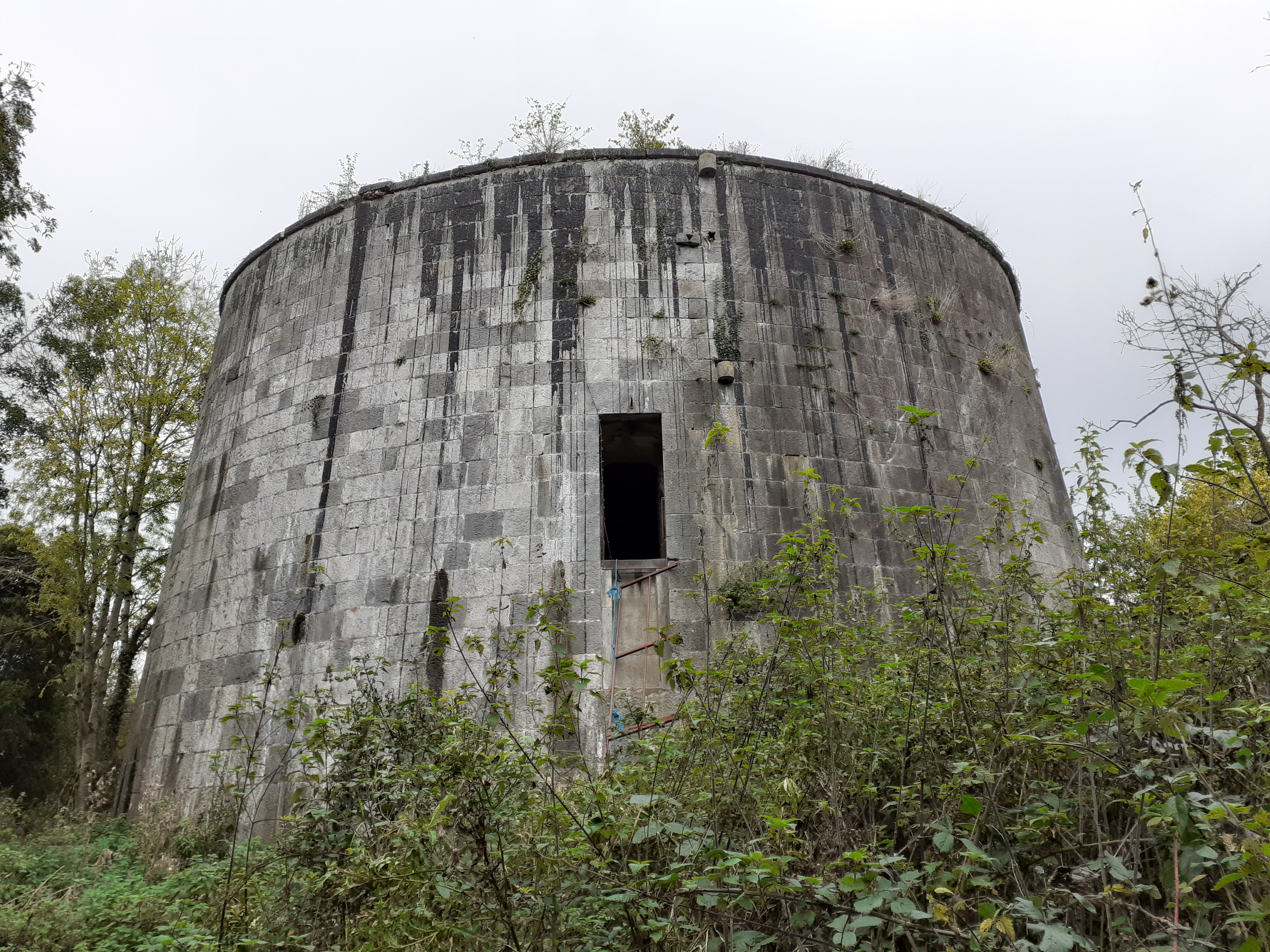

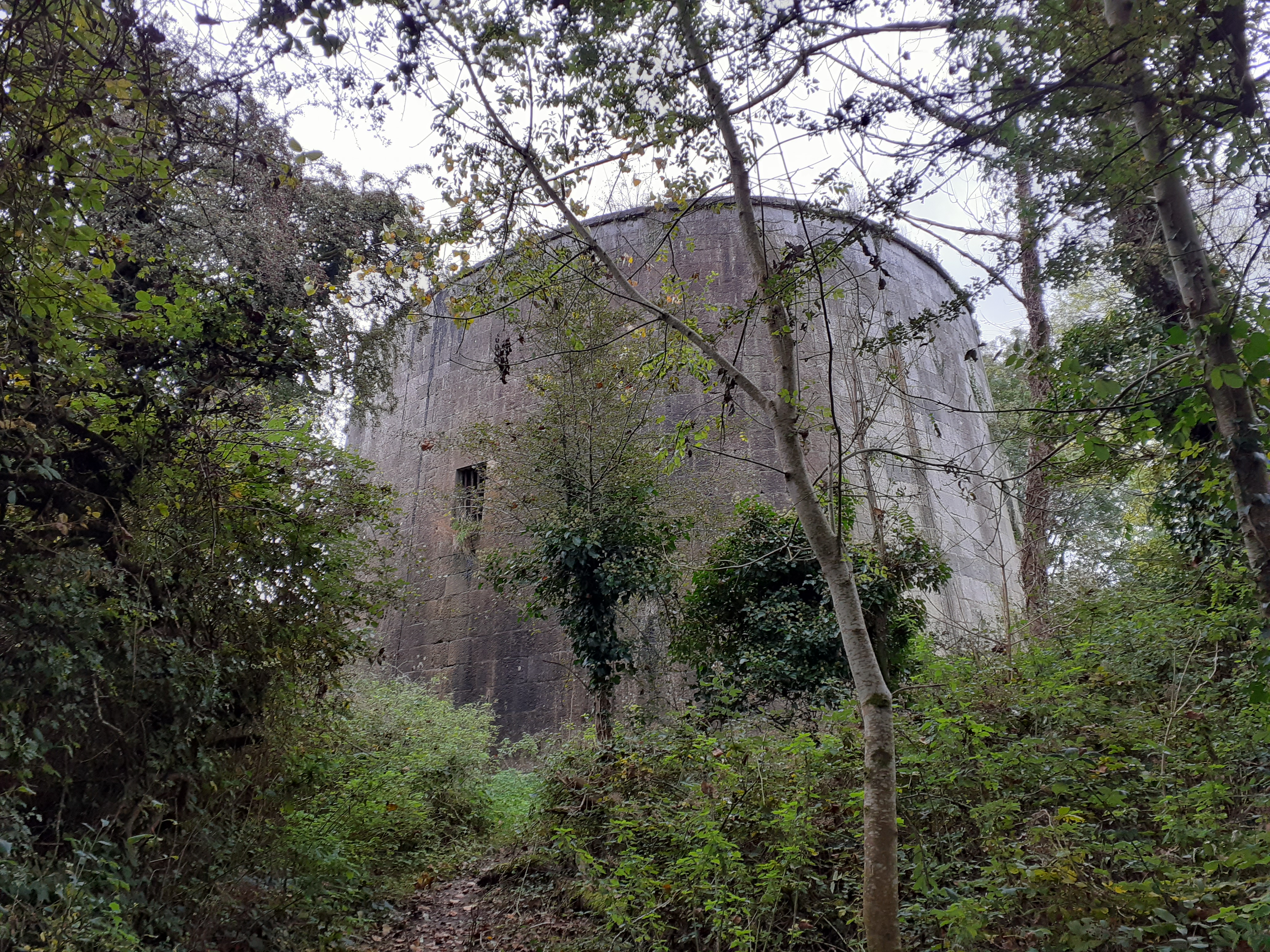

Site information
- Type: Defence Martello tower
- Open to the public: yes

Location
- Location within Ireland
- Coordinates: 53.17162°N 8.08051°W

Site history
- Built: 1810-1815
- Materials: stone

Meelick Martello Tower is a Martello tower constructed on Moran Island in the River Shannon between Meelick, County Galway and Clonahenoge, County Offaly. The tower was built about 1811 to protect the river at Meelick rapids where there is a fording opportunity. It was feared at the time that the French would invade Ireland from the west coast. Unusually the tower is cam-shaped with three gun emplacements. It reinforced the existing defences at Keelogue Battery on Incherky Island.

== Protected Status ==
The County Offaly Record of Protected Structures lists the tower as a protected structure (ref 38-03).
