= Derrinsallow =

Townland in County Tipperary, Ireland

Derrinsallow (Doirín Salach in Irish) is a townland in the historical Barony of Ormond Lower, County Tipperary, Ireland. It is located North-West of Birr on the south-west bank of the Little Brosna River within the civil parish of Dorrha. The Little Brosna River provided power to the 19th century corn mills at Derrinsallow which although now in ruins are mentioned in the National Inventory of Architectural Heritage. The mill race is a popular fishing area. A triple arched limestone bridge from the 19th century crosses the river here.
