= Little Brosna River =

River in Ireland, tributary of the Shannon

Coordinates: 53°10′N 8°04′W

Little Brosna
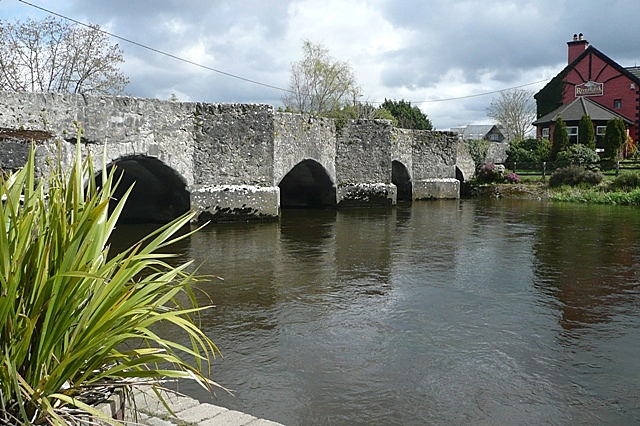
- Little Brosna River at Riverstown
- Etymology: Possibly means "place of twigs"
- Native name: An Bhrosnach Bheag (Irish)

Location
- Country: Ireland

Physical characteristics
- Source
  - location: Near Dunkerrin, County Offaly
- Mouth
  - location: Atlantic via the River Shannon
- Length: 57.6 km (35.8 mi)
- Basin size: 662 km^{2} (256 sq mi)
- Discharge
  - average: 8.062 m^{3}/s (284.7 cu ft/s)

Basin features
- River system: Shannon
- Tributaries
  - left: Camcor River

The Little Brosna River (Irish: An Bhrosnach Bheag) rises near Dunkerrin, County Offaly, Ireland. It flows for 36 miles before joining the River Shannon.

== Course ==
The river rises near Dunkerrin, and flows near Birr; it forms part of the boundary between County Offaly and County Tipperary. It crosses an area of limestone, then passes through an area of callow before merging with the easternmost of four channels of the Shannon near Victoria Lock, by Clonahenoge and facing Meelick.

=== Tributaries ===
The most significant tributary is the River Camcor at Birr, while others include the Pallas Stream, Bunow River, Clareen Stream, Golden Grove Stream and Keeloge Stream.

== Bridges ==
Sharavogue Bridge, built in the early 1850s, carries the R492 road over the river which here forms the boundary between the townlands of Sharavogue and Ballincor Demesne. The bridge is listed as being of architectural and technical interest.

Railway Bridge at Glasderry More is a latticed metal bridge carrying the (disused) railway line over the Little Brosna.

Riverstown Bridge, with five arches, carries the N52 across the Little Brosna near Riverstown. This is a narrow bridge at 5.15m between parapets, with traffic negotiating the bridge one direction at a time with the aid of traffic lights.

Croghan Bridge a stone bridge of three arches from the mid-18th century, it carries the Croghan Road, Birr across the Little Brosna.

Ivy Bridge crosses the river within the demesne of Birr Castle, just downstream of the confluence of the rivers Camcor and Little Brosna.

Derrinsallow Bridge, built about 1850, has three arches of dressed limestone and rubble. It crosses from County Offaly to County Tipperary at Derrinsallow.

New Bridge built about 1820 is the last crossing before joining the Shannon. It has five rounded arches of limestone. The bridge takes the R438 road between County Tipperary and County Offaly.

== Angling ==
The Little Brosna is a historic and popular angling river, particularly known for its brown trout. An electric fishing survey of the river at Riverstown was conducted in September 2012 by Inland Fisheries Ireland. Species noted here were brown trout (87), lamprey (1), salmon (38) and stone loach (7).

Fishing in the Shinrone and Birr area is mostly in late spring and early summer. Dry fly fishing is the preferred method used by anglers to catch trout on the river. In some cases, spinning can be used to catch some of the bigger brown trout.

Inland Fisheries Ireland operate a fish farm outside Shinrone, near Brosna. Rainbow and brown trout are bred there. The farm is located on the river.

== Drainage ==
The Little Brosna Water Management Unit Action Plan covers 681km2 in County Offaly, North Tipperary and County Laois.

Sharavogue Bog is a raised bog situated on the flood plain of the Little Brosna at Sharavogue in County Offaly. It is an example of a type of habitat that is becoming increasingly rare in Ireland and Europe and is on the list of Special Areas of Conservation, as listed by the National Parks and Wildlife Service.

Redwood raised bog, named for Redwood, North Tipperary, has developed on the southern margin of the Little Brosna flood plain at its confluence with the Shannon. It forms part of the Little Brosna Callows Area of Scientific Interest, which is of international importance as a wildfowl habitat and as a classical example of a flood plain ecosystem. The reserve includes the last relatively intact bog dome on the flood plain margin as well as a dried out portion of another dome and an area of fen. The intact dome has a typical raised bog flora and in the centre it retains quaking areas and numerous bog pools. Established in 1991 it is in state ownership.

== See also ==
- Rivers of Ireland
- Shannon River Basin
