= Crotty Schism =

19th-century local Catholic schism in Birr, Ireland

The Crotty Schism took place in the early 19th century, when Father Michael Crotty and his cousin, Father William Crotty, left the Catholic Church to form their own church in Birr, County Offaly, Ireland.

Michael had a history of inter-personal conflicts with other Catholics, however the initial dispute leading to the schism was over control of a new church being constructed in Birr. The acrimony over conflict this eventually resulted in the local bishop placing Birr's parish under interdict, and Michael being excommunicated.

Michael and William then began preaching a more Protestant-aligned doctrine, and Michael was able to convince some parishioners who had followed him to construct a new church (which is now used as a store). After Michael and William had established their religious following, Michael was often absent from Birr in order to raise funds for the group from the wider British Protestant community. While he was away, William and several other followers officially joined the Synod of Ulster (Presbyterian Church) without Michael's knowledge nor approval.

By 1842, the schism created was mostly exhausted and Michael moved to England permanently. In the 1850s he even applied for readmission into the Catholic Church. On 4 May 1862, Michael Crotty died in a mental asylum in Kortrijk, Belgium.

The old church still stands in Castle Street. The site of a 20th-century beerhouse, the prestige of the church has decreased significantly over the years. While certain faithful still attend services occasionally held, most Catholics avoid the historical site.
