= John's Hall =

Municipal building in Birr, County Offaly, Ireland

- Halla Eoin
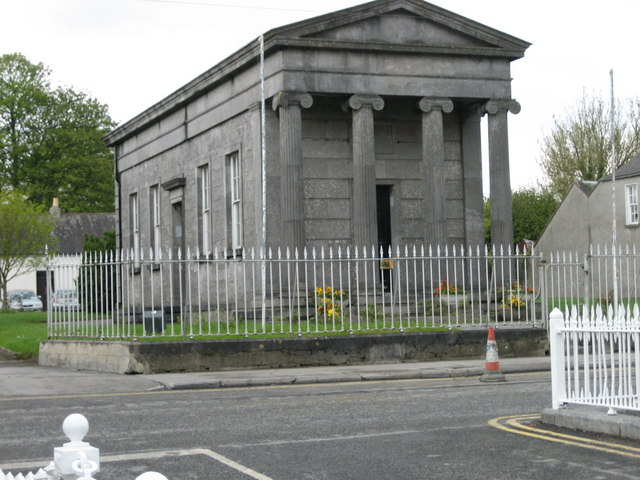
- John's Hall

- Location within Ireland

General information
- Architectural style: Neoclassical style
- Location: John's Mall, Birr, Ireland
- Coordinates: 53.0960°N 7.9082°W
- Completed: 1833

Design and construction
- Architect: Bernard Mullins

John's Hall (Irish: Halla Eoin), also known as Birr Town Hall (Irish: Halla an Bhaile Biorra) is a municipal building in John's Mall, Birr, County Offaly, Ireland. The building is currently used by the Irish Heritage School as their lecturing and exhibition venue.

== History ==
The building was commissioned by Lawrence Parsons, 2nd Earl of Rosse, whose seat was at Birr Castle, to commemorate the death of his son, John Clere Parsons, who died of scarlet fever in August 1828, aged 26. The building was designed by Bernard Mullins in the neoclassical style and was inspired by the Temple on the Ilissus at Athens. It was built in ashlar stone at a cost of £1,100 and completed in 1833. The design involved a symmetrical main frontage facing onto John's Mall. It featured a short flight of steps leading up to a full-height portico formed by four fluted Ionic order columns supporting an entablature and a pediment. There was a square-headed doorway with an architrave, surmounted by a panel commemorating the short life of John Clere Parsons at the back of the portico, and the side elevations, of five bays each, were fenestrated by sash windows with architraves.

A mechanics' institute, established to provide adult education for local people, was instituted in the building at an early stage. A Russian cannon, captured at the Siege of Sevastopol during the Crimean War, was presented to the town by the former Secretary of State for War, Lord Panmure, and installed to the southeast of the building in 1858.

A statue of the astronomer, William Parsons, 3rd Earl of Rosse, who built several giant telescopes, was designed and sculpted by John Henry Foley and unveiled in front of the building by the Countess of Rosse on 21 March 1876. A megalithic monument known as the "Seffin Stone", which had originally been located at Seffin to the south of Birr, was installed just to the southwest of the building in June 1974. The historian, Geraldus Cambrensis, referred to it as Umbilicus Hiberniae or the "Navel of Ireland", while Archbishop James Ussher claimed that it marked the "Centre of Ireland".

The building was used as a meeting place by Birr Urban District Council until 2002, and then as the meeting place of the successor town council, with the council offices located behind the main building, but it ceased to be the local seat of government when the council relocated to Saint John's Convent of Mercy in Wilmer Road in summer 2006. John's Hall, which has always remained in the ownership of the Birr Castle Estate, was leased to the Irish Heritage School, established in 2010, as their lecturing and exhibition venue, in 2019.
