= Clonahenoge =

Townland in County Offaly, Ireland

- Townland
- Location in Ireland
- Coordinates: 53°10′07″N 8°03′51″W
- Country: Ireland
- County: County Offaly

Area
  - Total: 2.96 km^{2} (1.14 sq mi)

Clonahenoge (Cluain Fheannóg in Irish) is a townland in County Offaly, Ireland. It is located at the confluence of the Little Brosna River and the River Shannon.

== Structures of note ==
Hamilton Lock and the Clonahenoge canal were built about 1755 to allow river traffic to bypass the Meelick rapids on the River Shannon. The lock is now disused, replaced by nearby Victoria lock, although the lock keepers cottage with roughcast walls (built 1755) is still in use for its original purpose. The lock is listed by the National Inventory of Architectural Heritage (a service provided by the Department of Arts, Heritage and the Gaeltacht) as being of special interest.

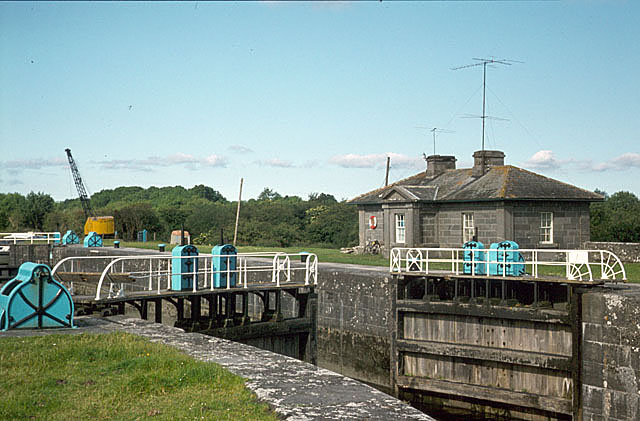
Victoria Lock on the River Shannon at Clonahenoge

Victoria Lock is the first lock on the River Shannon upstream of Lough Derg. The locks dimensions are 142 ft x 40 ft. The Shannon Commissioners had the lock constructed in the 1840s as part of a widescale upgrade of the Shannon Navigation. The lock is of architectural and technical interest and is still in use today by pleasure boats, both private and fleets of rental cruisers who use the River Shannon and the connecting canals. The cast iron bollards at the lockside were made by Fenton, Murray and Jackson Engineers of Leeds. A detached three-bay single-storey stone lock keeper's house (1843) is constructed from stone with a slate roof pierced by two stone chimneys. Although only single storey with a projecting central bay the house is a pleasing addition to the surrounding 19th-century development. The lock and cottage are both listed by the National Inventory of Architectural Heritage as being of special interest.

Meelick Martello Tower is a Martello tower constructed on Moran Island in the River Shannon. The tower was built about 1811 to protect the river at Meelick where rapids provide a fording opportunity. Unusually the tower is cam-shaped with three gun emplacements. It reinforced the existing defences at Keelogue Battery on Incherky Island.
