= Meelick, County Galway =

Townland in County Galway, Ireland

Coordinates: 53°10′46″N 8°05′36″W

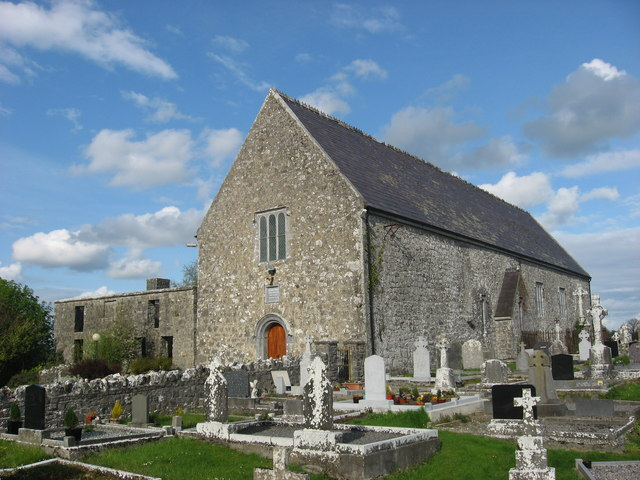
Former Franciscan church in Meelick, County Galway

Meelick (Irish: Míleac) is a townland on the River Shannon in County Galway, Ireland. It lies approximately 4 km southeast of the village of Eyrecourt. The townland is in a civil parish of the same name.

According to local sources, it is home to the oldest church still in use in Ireland having been given papal permission and built in 1414 AD (as St. Francis Friary). Meelick is also home to Meelick-Eyrecourt hurling club, which was founded in 1884. Meelick has a small pub which is known locally as "George's/The Shop". The area hosts a kayaking festival each year after the boating season halts in winter.

== Built heritage ==
=== Oldest Catholic church in use ===
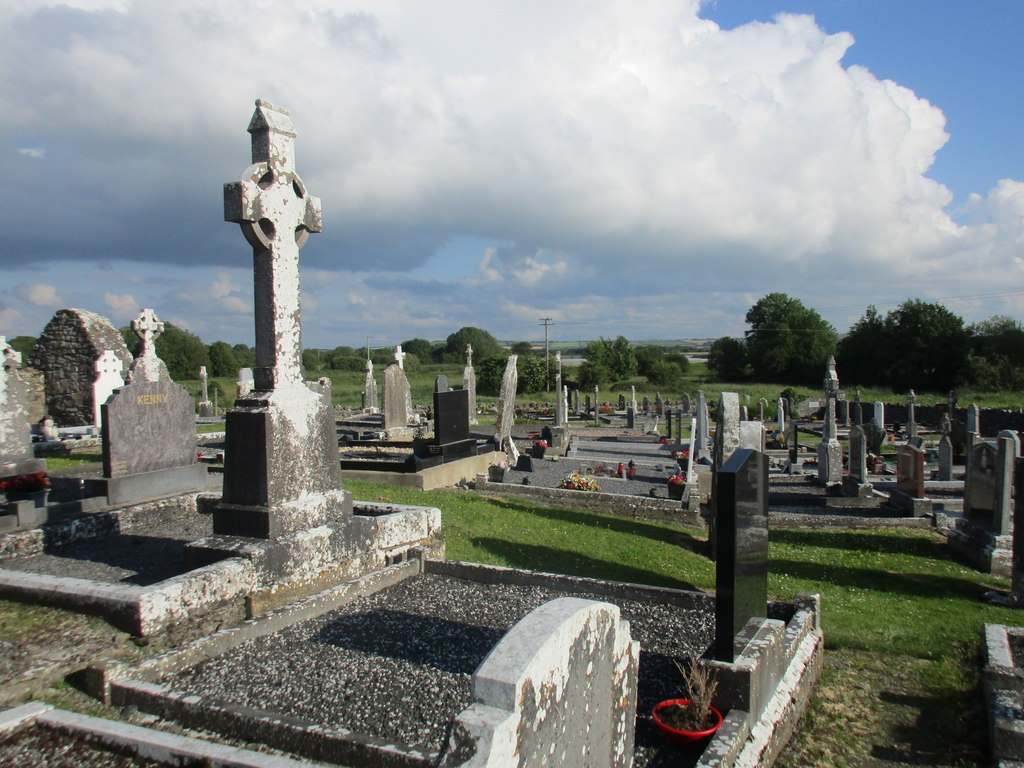
Churchyard at Meelick

According to local sources, Meelick has the oldest Irish Roman Catholic church, with continuous use since 1414 AD. Founded as a Franciscan abbey, the church and sacristy are still in use today. The ruins include traces of the transept chapel, friary and small mill. Papal permission for Meelick friary was granted by John XXII in 1414. The last friar of Meelick was Fr. Bonaventure Francis Reynolds. When he died in November 1852, there was no friar available to replace him. Since then the church has been maintained for weekly services. The Meelick Triduum still exists in early August when the Franciscans return to their abbey.

=== Castle ===
An Anglo Norman de Burgo (Burke) Castle was erected close to the church, in the fields to the north of the church. The earthworks relating to this castle can still be seen. The location was chosen because Meelick was one of the few traditional crossing points where the river Shannon could be forded.

=== Meelick Lock ===
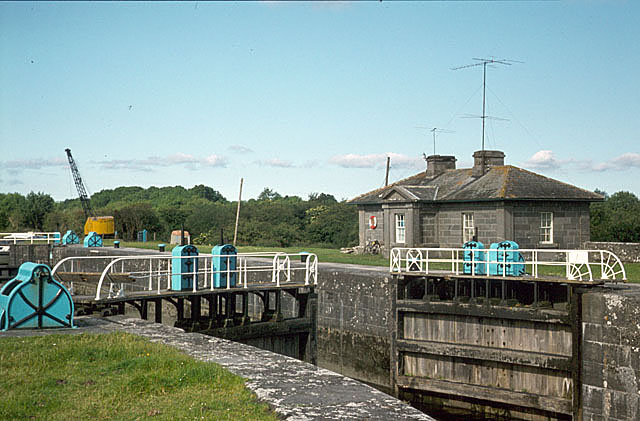
Meelick Lock

Meelick Lock, also known as Victoria Lock, is one of the busiest locks on the Shannon Navigation. It is 43.4m long by 12m wide. The rise of water levels is 2.4m. It was built by the Shannon Commissioners in Limestone in the mid 19th century to address a shallows and change of level in the river. The supervising engineer was Thomas Rhodes. The stone used for the lock was excavated from the new canal bed. The canal serving the new lock was built in 1841 by contractor William MacKenzie. When the lock works were being undertaken the workmen went on strike, looking for more pay: they wanted 1s. 3d. per day. The lock was completed in 1843. Originally the gates were made of French oak and planked in northern pine. The lock replaces the earlier Hamilton Lock on the Clonahenoge Canal.

=== Defences ===
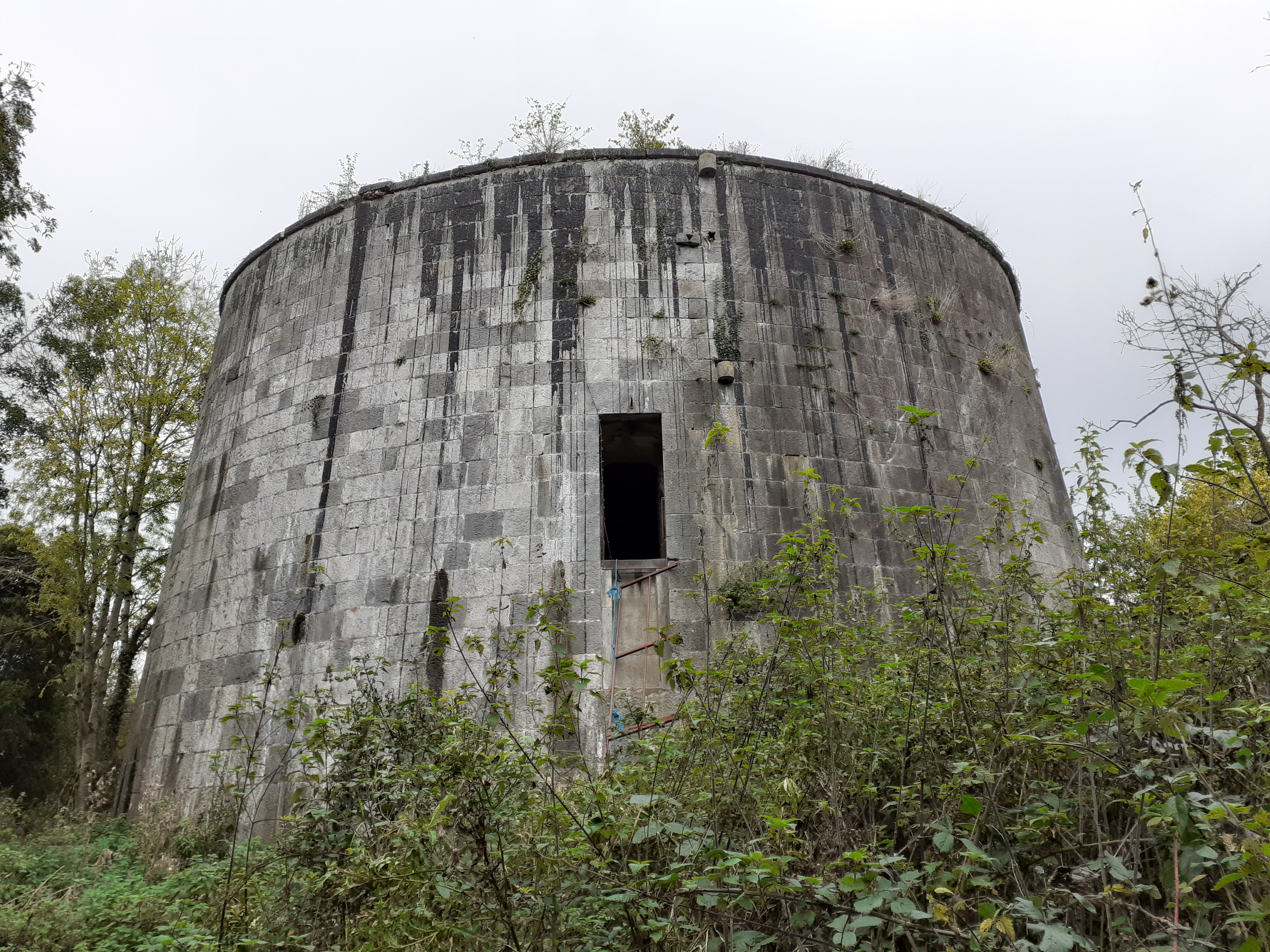
Meelick Martello Tower

The river crossing at this location is guarded by several defences. In addition to the de Burgo castle mentioned above, Meelick Martello Tower was constructed along with other Martello towers by the government about 1811. It was built, on Moran Island at Clonahenoge on the County Offaly side of the River Shannon, to protect Leinster from a Napoleonic invasion and to control the river crossing at Keelogue. It reinforced existing defences at Keelogue Battery on Innishirkeigh Island. Island. Unusually the tower is cam-shaped with three gun emplacements.

== Recreation ==
=== Waterways ===
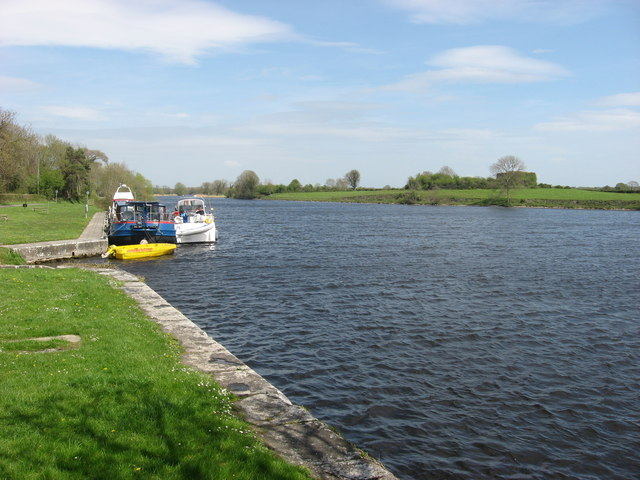
Meelick Quay on the River Shannon

Meelick is a location for fishing, primarily salmon and wild brown trout. The river here is wide (over 1.5 km from bank to bank at its broadest point) and has a number of islands, weirs, pools and streams. There are islands separating an artificial cut on the County Offaly bank with the main River Shannon at Meelick on the County Galway bank. It has a very small spring salmon run from April into mid-May. Summer salmon arrive generally from mid-June. Runs are moderate and variable from year to year.

Meelick is on the route of the Hymany Way, part of the Beara-Breifne long distance walking and cycling trail between the Beara Peninsula in County Cork and Blacklion in County Cavan.

=== Gaelic games ===
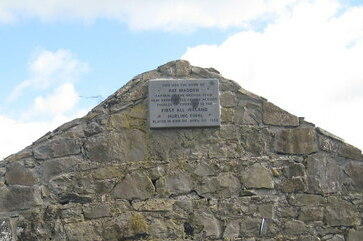
Plaque, on the gable of a ruined house, commemorating Meelick hurler Patrick Madden

In 1887, Meelick were one of the first teams to compete for the All-Ireland Senior Hurling Championship, the first national championship of the game of hurling ever held in Ireland. Representing County Galway in the final, Meelick were defeated by Thurles, representing County Tipperary. The game was held in Birr in County Offaly in front of a crowd of 5,000. Patrick Madden, captain of the Meelick side, is commemorated with a plaque on the gable end of his birthplace and lifetime home in the village.

Meelick-Eyrecourt is the name of the local Gaelic Athletic Association club today.

== See also ==
- List of abbeys and priories in Ireland (County Galway)
- List of towns and villages in Ireland
