= Birr, County Offaly =

Town in County Offaly, Ireland

Birr Biorra (Irish)
- Town
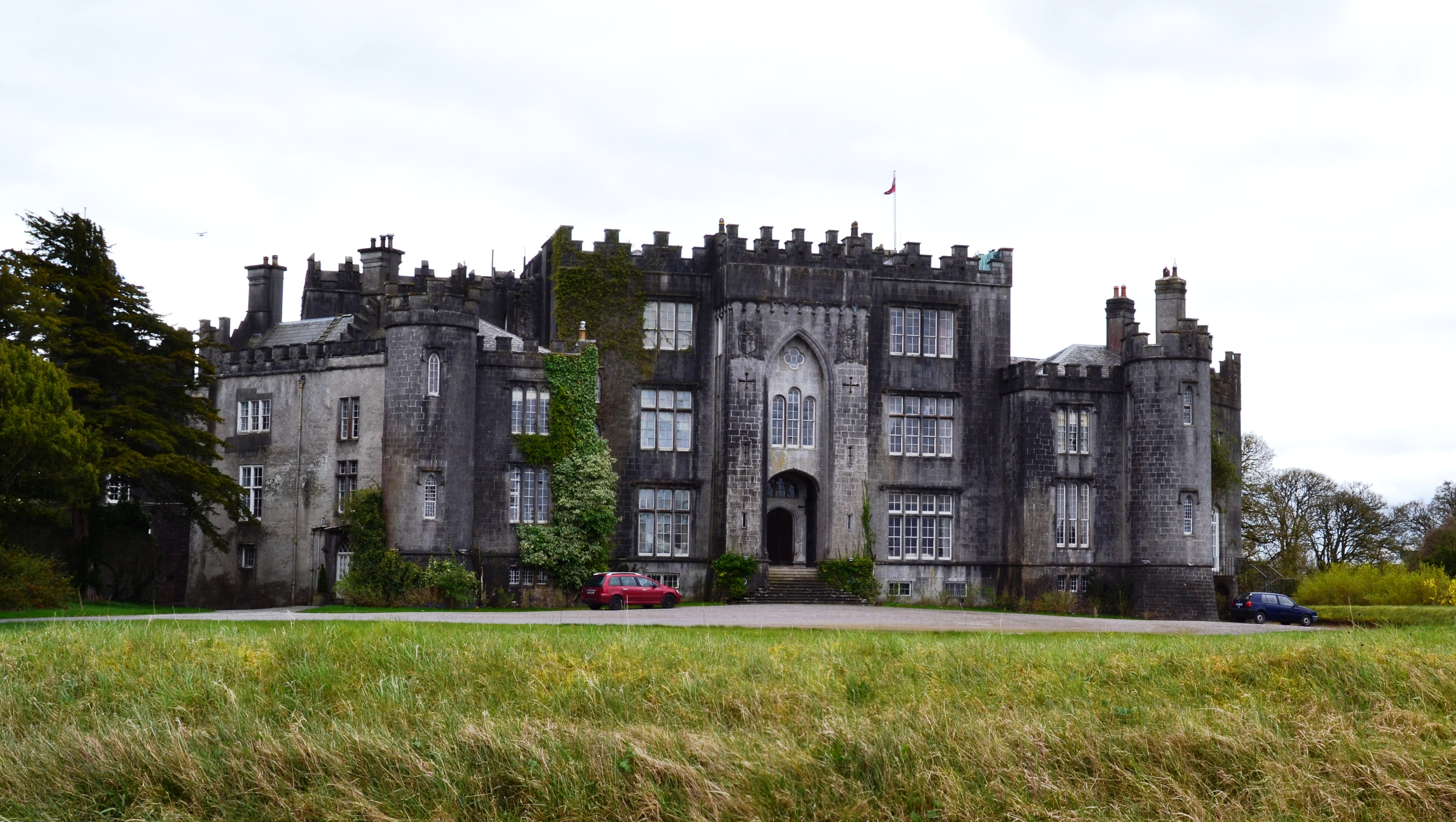
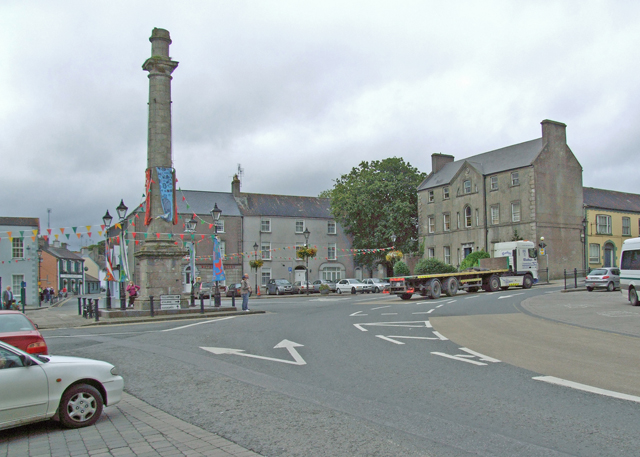
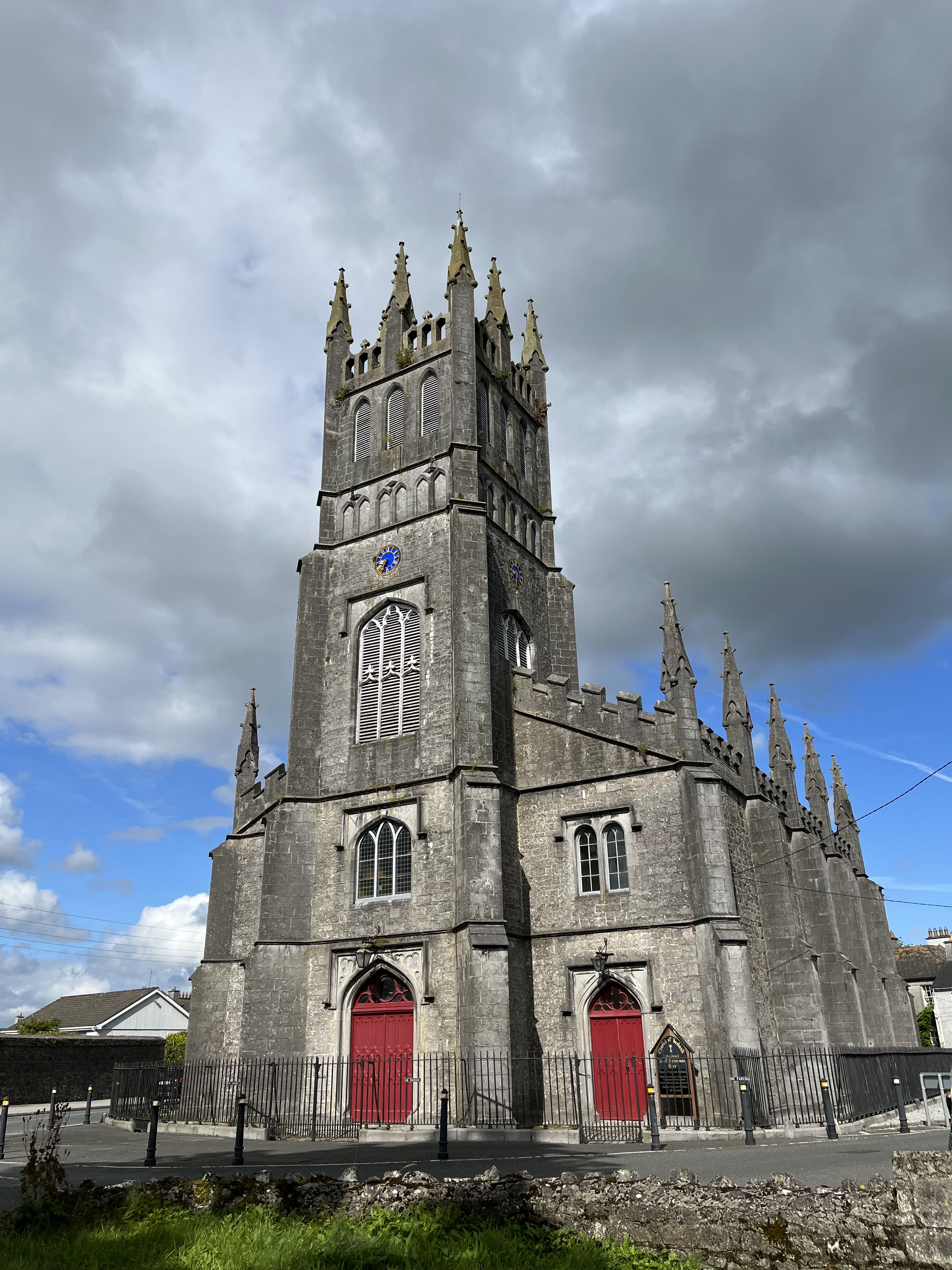
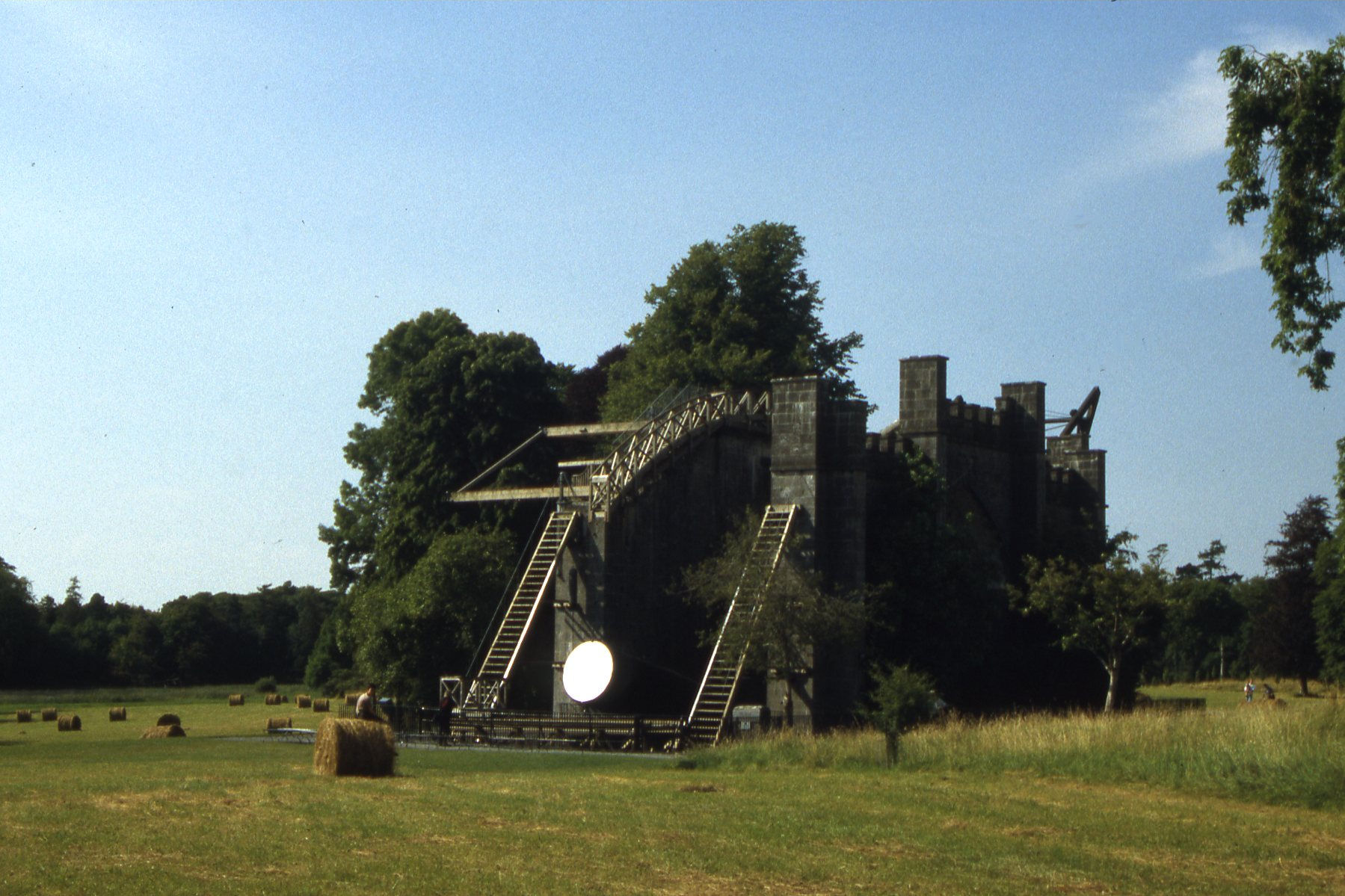
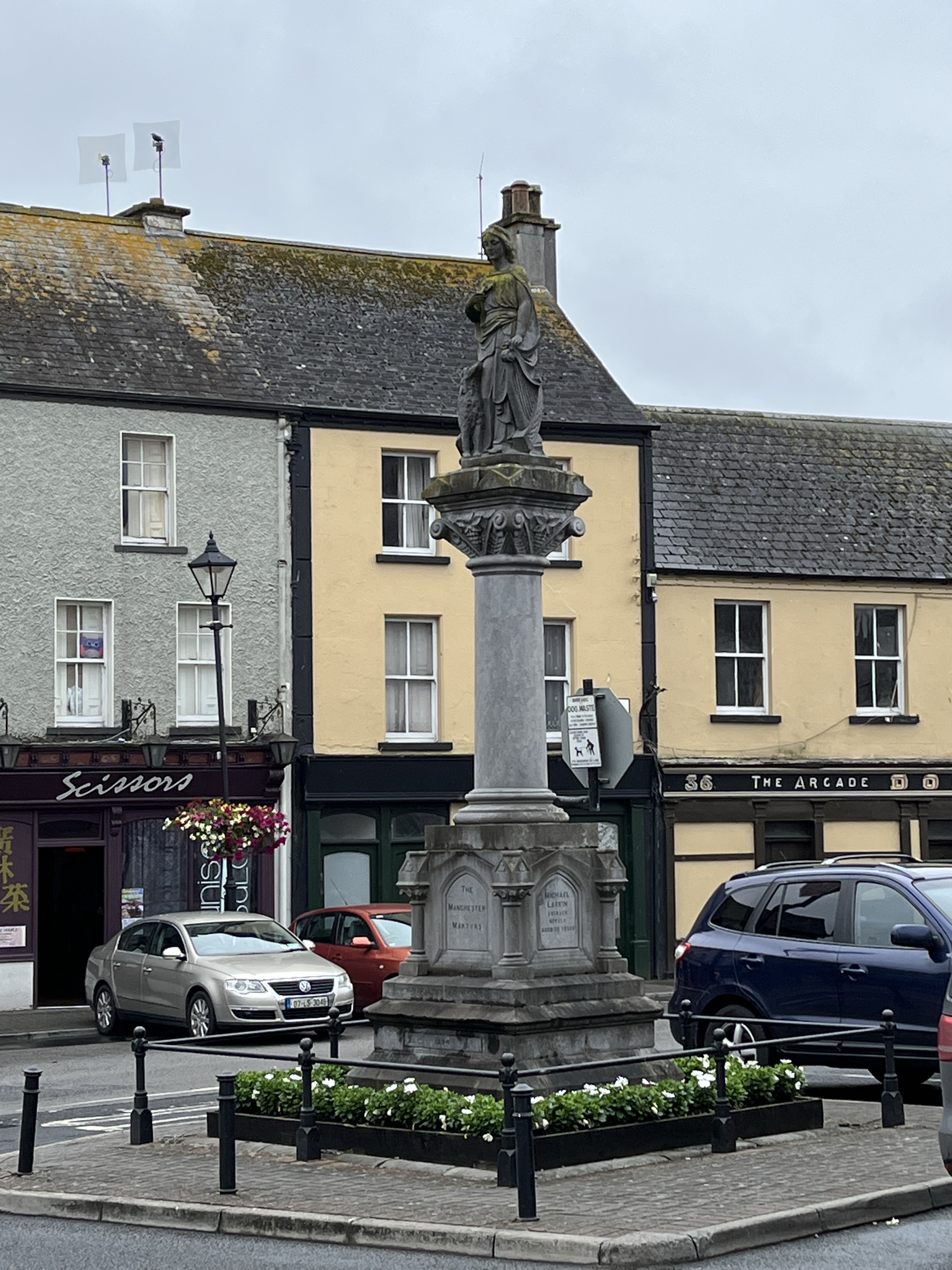
- Birr Castle Emmet Square St Brendan's Church The Leviathan of Parsonstown Manchester Martyrs memorial

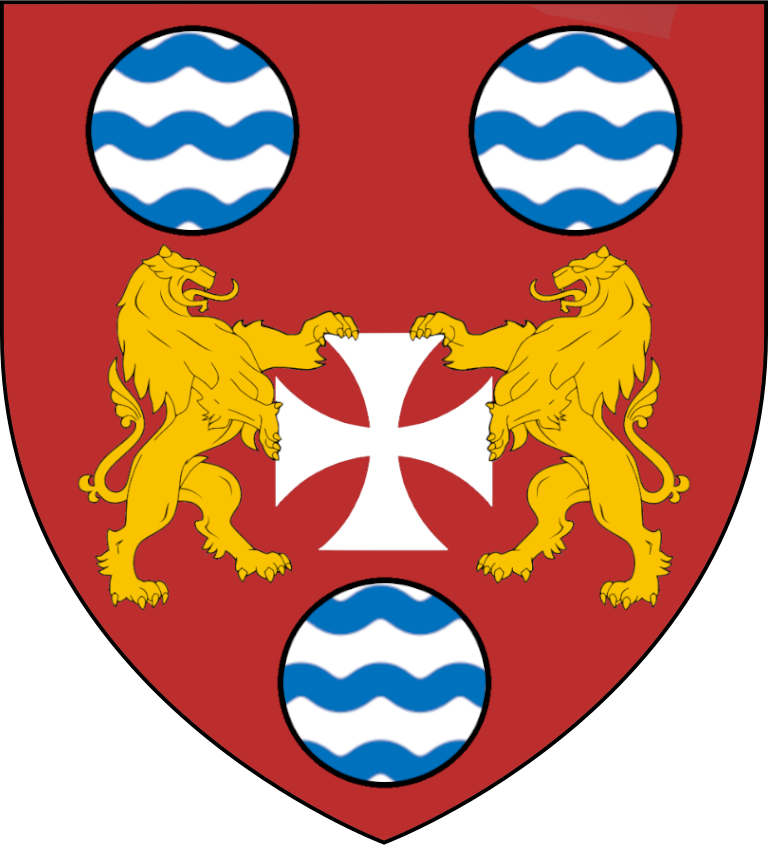
- Coat of arms

- Location in Ireland
- Coordinates: 53.0914°N 7.9133°W
- Country: Ireland
- Province: Leinster
- County: County Offaly
- Dáil constituency: Offaly
- Elevation: 75 m (246 ft)

Population (2022)
  - Total: 4,726
- Time zone: UTC±0 (WET)
  - Summer (DST): UTC+1 (IST)
- Eircode: R42
- Telephone area code: 057
- Irish Grid Reference: N058045

Historical population
Year	Pop.	±%
1821	5,406	—
1831	6,594	+22.0%
1841	6,336	−3.9%
1851	5,480	−13.5%
1861	5,401	−1.4%
1871	4,939	−8.6%
1881	4,955	+0.3%
1891	4,313	−13.0%
1901	4,438	+2.9%
1911	4,047	−8.8%
1926	3,402	−15.9%
1936	3,297	−3.1%
1946	3,224	−2.2%
1951	3,285	+1.9%
1956	3,922	+19.4%
1961	3,872	−1.3%
1966	3,924	+1.3%
1971	3,981	+1.5%
1981	4,262	+7.1%
1986	4,194	−1.6%
1991	4,056	−3.3%
1996	4,193	+3.4%
2002	4,436	+5.8%
2006	5,081	+14.5%
2011	5,818	+14.5%
2016	5,741	−1.3%
2022	4,726	−17.7%

Birr (/ˈbɜːr/; Irish: Biorra, meaning "plain of water") is a heritage market town in County Offaly, Ireland. The town is situated near the meeting of the Camcor and Little Brosna rivers, the latter flowing on into the River Shannon near Victoria Lock. Birr had a population of 4,726 at the 2022 census. The town is in a civil parish of the same name.

Between 1620 and 1899, it was known as Parsonstown, named for the Parsons family, locally recognised as landowners and hereditary Earls of Rosse. Birr is a designated Irish Heritage Town that has preserved its Georgian heritage. The town of Birr features several historical buildings of note, including Birr Castle. Many houses in neighbourhoods like John's Place and Oxmantown Mall retain their fanlight windows, constructed during the Georgian period.

The town is known for Birr Castle and Gardens: the home of the Parsons family and the site of the Leviathan of Parsonstown, which was the largest telescope in the world for over 70 years.

== Access and transport ==
Birr lies on the N52 and N62 national secondary roads. The routes are combined as they pass through Birr. The R439, R440 and R489 regional roads also terminate in the town.

The Ormond Flying Club has been in operation at Birr Airfield for over 30 years.

Bus Éireann provide public transport services to the town. The Athlone to Limerick service regularly passes through the town daily. Kearns privately owned bus service provides a number of direct bus services to Dublin from Birr, as well as a weekend service connecting the town with the city of Galway via Portumna, Killimor, and Loughrea.

Birr railway station, the terminus of a branch from the Limerick–Ballybrophy line at Roscrea, opened on 8 March 1858 and closed on 1 January 1963.

== History ==
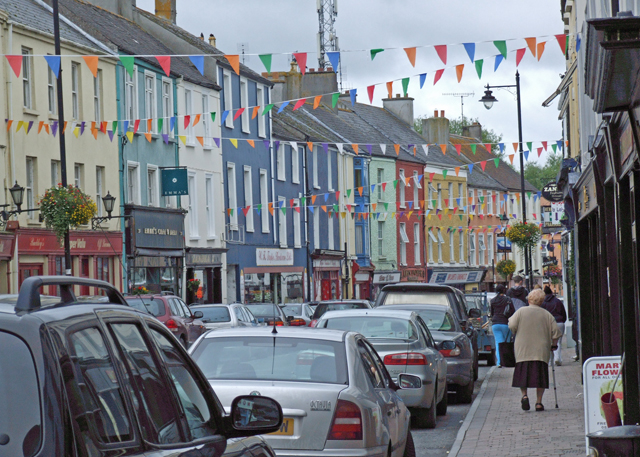
Main Street

=== Ancient history ===
A monastery was founded here by St Brendan of Birr. It produced the MacRegol Gospels, named after the abbot at the turn of the 8th/9th century and now to be seen in the Bodleian Library in Oxford. The Synod of Birr, held in 697, was the occasion on which the Cáin Adomnáin, or law of innocents, was pronounced.

In Gaelic Ireland, Birr was located in the O'Carroll territory of Éile. This petty kingdom (Irish: Tuatha) formed an area that now forms the south of County Offaly and the northeast of County Tipperary. The Tuatha was subject to the overkingdom (Irish: Rí ruirech) of Munster and formed a border with the Kingdom of Meath to the east. The boundary between Ely O'Carroll and the ancient Meath is co-terminous with the present boundary between the Diocese of Killaloe and the Diocese of Meath. The O'Carroll family had a castle located at the present site of Birr Castle. Following the Plantations of Ireland, Birr was located in the Barony of Ballybritt following the formation of King's County (now County Offaly) in 1556.

The town itself is an old market and former garrison town dating to the 1620s.

=== Crotty Schism ===
The town was also the location of the Crotty Schism, one of the few schisms to affect the Catholic Church in Ireland in the 19th century. The church on Castle Street was the result of the Crotty Schism and was allowed to fall into a derelict condition following disuse resulting from the end of the schism. The church is known locally as Crotty's Church. In the early 2020s, it was restored externally and converted into a private residence contrary to the wishes of the Town's residents.

=== Birr Barracks ===
Birr Barracks became the depot of the Prince of Wales's Leinster Regiment (Royal Canadians) from 1881. The barracks at Birr was burned down in 1922 during the Irish Civil War and the outer perimeter wall is all that remains. Outside the old Barracks Wall, there is a monument erected in memory of the soldiers of the Leinster Regiment who were killed during their service. A wreath-laying ceremony takes place annually. Much of the Barracks' historical footprint is now occupied by the Grant Engineering factory.

=== Annalistic references ===
See Annals of Inisfallen.

- AI664.1 Kl. Death of Cúcen Máthair, and of Diarmait, son of Aed Slaine. [AU 665]. Fighting in Birra.
- AI822.1 Kl. Mac Riaguil, abbot of Birra, rested.

== Features ==
=== Georgian Birr ===
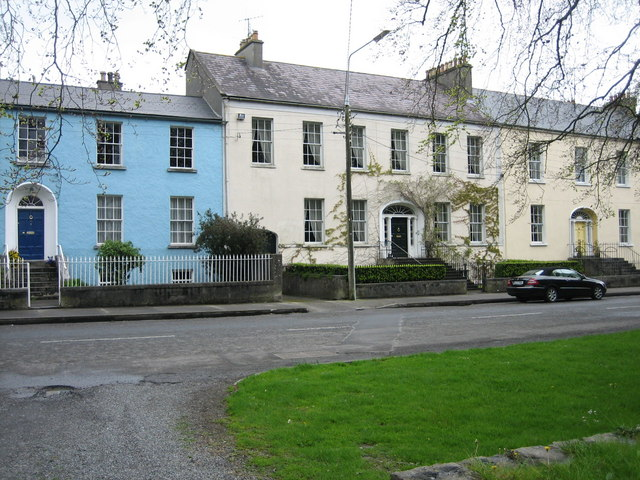
Georgian Birr – Oxmantown Mall

Birr is a designated Irish Heritage Town due to the preservation and wealth of Georgian architecture in the town. The earliest Georgian-style buildings dating from the 1740s are located in Emmet Square and Emmet Street (then known as Cumberland Square and Cumberland Street).

The column in the centre of the square dates from 1747 and was built to carry the statue of the Duke of Cumberland, known as the Bloody Duke and the victor of the Battle of Culloden. The statue was removed in 1915 as it was in danger of collapse.

The Oxmantown Mall was laid out in the early 19th century and was designed as a promenade leading from Birr Castle gates to the Church of Ireland. The mall is tree lined on one side with the Georgian houses on the other.

John's Mall was also built during this time also with fine Georgian buildings. The area is also known as the chains due to the sturdy chain railings enclosing the central plots in the centre of the Mall. Birr Town Council met here in a building known as John's Hall built in the style of a Greek Temple.

The Seffin Stone is said to mark the centre of Ireland. Mentioned by Geraldus Cambrensis, who referred to it as Umbilicus Hiberniae, the indentations on the stone are as old as megalithic sites, such as Newgrange. Myths claim that the indentations are from the hand of Fionn MacCuthaill, hence the origin of the name as Suigh Finn (pronounced "See-Finn"), the Seat of Fionn. It is located to the left of the gates to John's Hall, on John's Mall, close to Emmet Square. The Stone is accompanied by a decommissioned cannon, The Crimean Gun, which was presented to the Parsons family and the people of Birr following its capture during the Siege of Sevastopol in the Crimean War. The Cannon was originally displayed inside the Castle Demesne before being placed outside John's Hall.

In Emmet Square stands Dooly's Hotel: one of the oldest coaching inns in Ireland, dating from 1747. The name of Galway Blazers was given to the Galway Hunt after a celebration held in the hotel in 1809 resulted in the premises being set on fire. Film director John Huston was latterly a member of the Galway Blazers. Australian soprano Dame Nellie Melba famously sang to crowds gathered below in the Square, from her hotel room above in Dooly's Hotel. A nightclub attached to the hotel was named "Melba's" to mark the occasion.

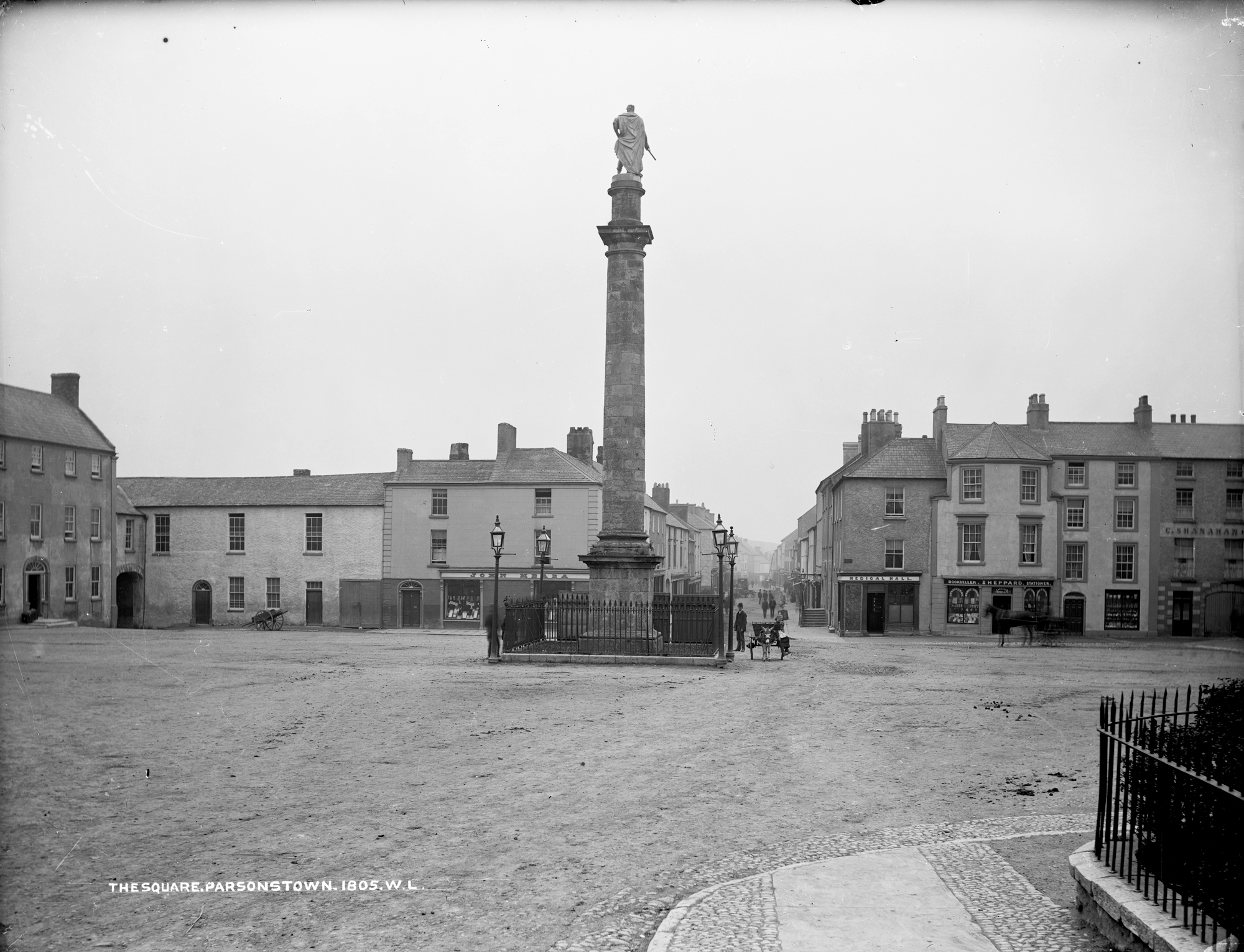
Cumberland Square (now Emmet Square) c.1880-1900. The statue was removed from the pillar in 1915

=== Ecclesiastical architecture ===
On the Wilmer road, near the County Arms Hotel, is a Gothic-style Catholic church built. St. Brendan's Church of Ireland was also built in Gothic style in 1815 and is located in the Oxmantown Mall. A smaller Methodist Church known as Wesley Chapel was built in 1820 on Emmett Street to accommodate a growing Methodist congregation following the preaching of John Wesley in the late 18th century in Birr.

The Sisters of Mercy convent on Wilmer Road beside the Catholic church is also a gothic-styled building. Most of the convent was converted by Offaly County Council to civic offices and a public library.

=== Birr Castle ===
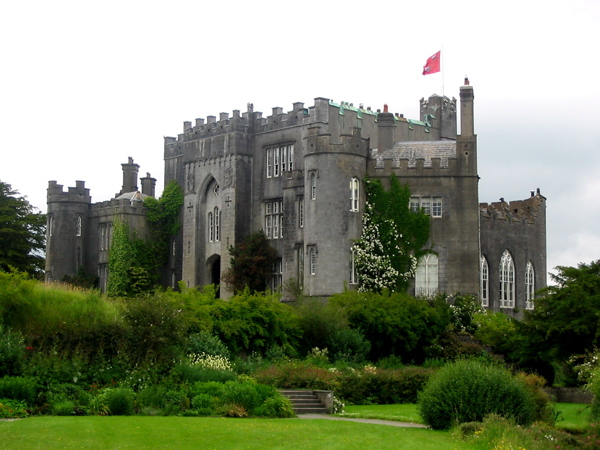
The castle.

In the 16th century, the O'Carrolls of Éile had one of their castles here and this was granted to the English-born politician and judge Sir Lawrence Parsons in the course of the Stuart plantation, c. 1620. Sir Laurence Parsons built most of the structure of the present castle on the site of the original castle's Gatehouse. The castle was twice besieged in the 17th century and one of the towers still shows the scars of the artillery of Patrick Sarsfield, 1st Earl of Lucan, who tried unsuccessfully to take it. The castle remains the seat of the Earls of Rosse and is home to the current peer, Brendan Parsons, 7th Earl of Rosse, with family members resident in the demesne. As a family home, most of the castle is only open to the public on special occasions, though five reception rooms can be visited, by guided tour only, through the demesne's visitor centre. The castle's demesne, however, is open to tourists every day of the year, and the gardens comprise a landscaped park with waterfalls, rivers and a lake, as well as the large reflecting telescope, the Leviathan of Parsonstown, and the modern radio-telescope, I-LOFAR. Below the South face of the Castle proper, St. Brendan's Well can be found. It is a set of steps descending below ground level covered by a small gated grotto. The bottom step is submerged in well water.

==== Birr Telescope – The 'Leviathan of Parsonstown' ====
Telescope and support structure

The main feature on the grounds of the castle is the great Leviathan of Parsonstown, an astronomical telescope with a 72-inch metal mirror erected by The 3rd Earl of Rosse, which was, until 1917, the largest telescope in the world. The spiral structure of nebulae was discovered through this telescope. It featured in the PBS (USA) documentary, 'Telescope – Hunting the Edge of Space Part 1: The Mystery of the Milky Way' (2011). Astronomy broadcaster Sir Patrick Moore wrote The Astronomy of Birr Castle (1971), a history of the telescope and the significance of the work carried out here.

=== Workhouse ===
The workhouse, located in Syngefield, on Newbridge Street, opened in 1842 before the Great Famine. The building is now mainly derelict. It is not yet open to the public.

=== Firsts ===
On 31 August 1869, the first road fatality recorded in history occurred in Birr, when local-born scientist Mary Ward, a cousin of The 3rd Earl of Rosse, fell from a steam-powered car on a bend. The vehicle traversed her, causing fatal injuries.

A descendant of the O'Carrolls, Charles Carroll was the first and only Catholic to sign the United States Declaration of Independence and, also, the only signatory to give his address. To distinguish himself from his father, Charles Carroll of Annapolis, he signed in full as "Charles Carroll of Carrollton".

== Local government ==
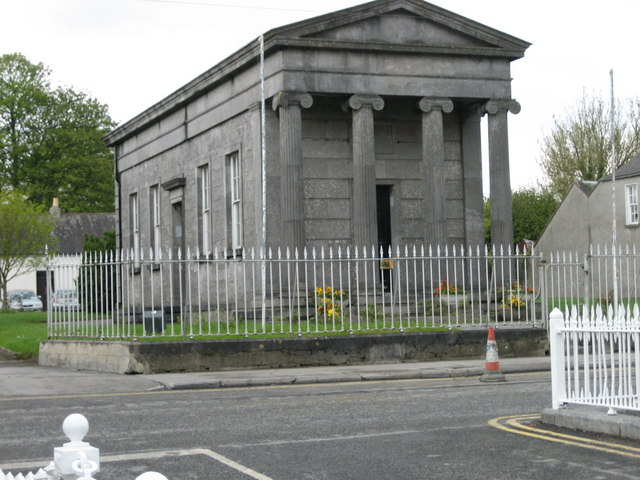
John's Hall, John's Mall, the former seat of Birr Town Council

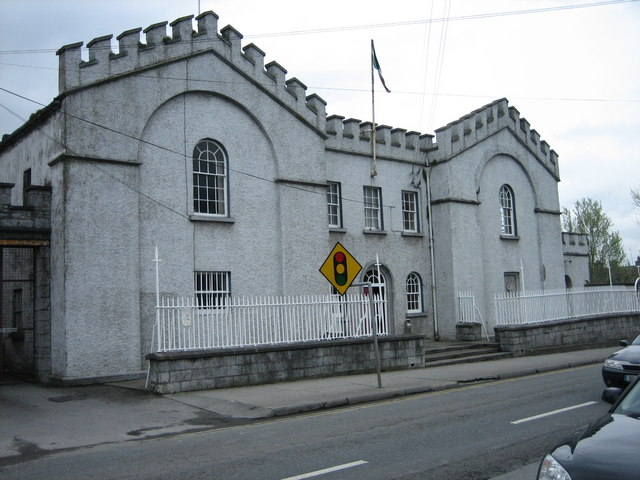
Birr Court House

In local government, Birr is a municipal district within Offaly County Council. The district itself covers the entire west and south of Offaly. The district returns 6 elected representatives to Offaly County Hall in Tullamore. The area was administered by Birr Urban District Council until 2002, and subsequently by Birr Town Council until 2014, when the council was dissolved and administration of the town was amalgamated with Offaly County Council in accordance with the Local Government Reform Act 2014.

=== Birr Court House ===
Birr Court House, built c1830, is a detached five-bay two-storey castellated courthouse located on Townsend St, Birr. Over the years the building has served as a prison, court and county council offices. The courthouse has since closed down and now lies empty. The Courthouse was used to host Creative Arts events during Vintage Week 2023 and is hoped to be developed as part of the Creative Court project into a more permanent arts venue.

== Services and amenities ==
The town is served by four primary schools (St Brendan's Boys school, Mercy Primary School, the Model Primary School and Gaelscoil na Laochra) and one secondary school (St. Brendan's Community School).

== Sport ==
=== Hurling ===
Birr's hurling team, Birr GAA, has won the All-Ireland championship four times. Several of Birr's hurlers, including Brian Whelahan, attended St. Brendan's Community School.

The first ever All-Ireland hurling final was played in Hoare's field (currently the location of a Tesco store) in Birr on Easter Sunday, 1 April 1888, between Tipperary and Galway. The match was won by Tipperary on a score line of 1 goal, 1 point and 1 forfeit point to Galway's no score. A forfeit point was given against a player carrying the sliotar over his own goal line. The remarkably low score, albeit under different rules to the modern game, is recorded as the lowest score ever in a hurling match in the Guinness Book of Records.

=== Rugby ===
Founded in 1887, Birr RFC has lapsed on several occasions, particularly during the two world wars and again in the mid-1950s. It was reformed in 1963 and has been in continuous existence since.

=== Golf ===
Birr Golf Club is an 18-hole golf course which was founded in 1893. The course was founded originally at Barrone Court, moving to its present location at the Glenns, north of Birr, in 1909.

== Events and festivals ==
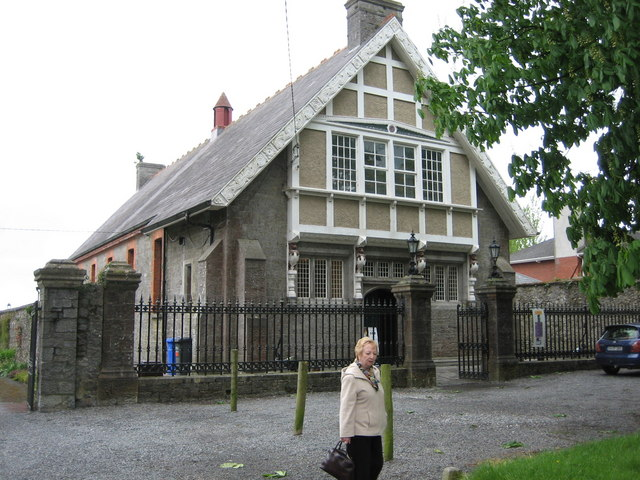
Birr Theatre and Arts Centre

The annual Birr Vintage Week and Arts Festival takes place in the town in August. The festival is run over one week, and includes a vintage parade, markets, and music and theatre events. Birr is also home to Birr Festival of Music, OFFline Film Festival, Scripts Ireland's Playwriting Festival and Hullabaloo! Offaly's Children's Arts Festival.

Birr Theatre and Arts Centre, located in the Oxmantown Mall, is a local cultural and social amenity for the arts, dance, film, music and theatre. The theatre has a 220 seating capacity. The building dates from January 1889 and is a Victorian period style structure within the surrounds of the tree lined Oxmantown Mall. Birr Stage Guild also stage plays in the theatre.

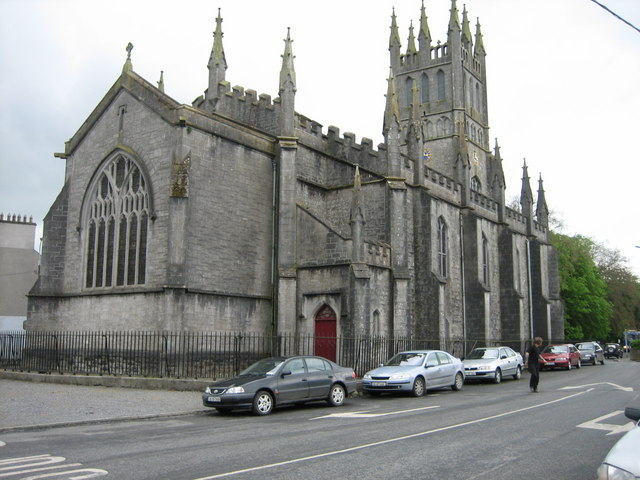
St Brendan's Church of Ireland

== People ==
- Luka Bloom, singer, wrote most of his 1998 album 'Salty Heaven' while resident in the town and described Birr as having the best trees in Ireland in the album's liner notes
- Eamon Bulfin, Irish republican activist during the 1916 Easter Rising, raised the Irish Tricolour over the GPO during the rising
- William Bulfin, early 20th-century author
- John Caffrey, recipient of the Victoria Cross
- Joseph Stirling Coyne (1803–1868), playwright, journalist, and one of the first editors of Punch magazine
- Brenda Dolphin (born 1945), psychologist and postulator for the beatification of Catherine McAuley
- Olwyn Enright, former Fine Gael TD for Laois–Offaly
- Tom Enright, former Fine Gael TD for Laois–Offaly
- Barry Glendenning, journalist
- Des Keogh, actor, born in Birr in 1935
- Mundy, musician
- John Murray, recipient of the Victoria Cross
- Bernadette O'Farrell actress best known for playing Maid Marian in the 1950s TV version of The Adventures of Robin Hood
- William Parsons, 3rd Earl of Rosse, astronomer
- William Parsons, 7th Earl of Rosse, businessman and current owner of Birr Castle
- Johnny Pilkington, hurler
- Aidan Quinn, actor
- Roesy, musician
- George Johnstone Stoney, physicist
- Mary Helena Synge, composer
- Mary Ward, Anglo-Irish scientist and writer; first person to die in a motor vehicle accident, 1869
- Brian Whelahan, hurler, 2009 Fine Gael candidate for Offaly County Council

== Climate ==
Birr, classified as an oceanic climate by Köppen, has cool winters, mild summers and adequate rainfall year-round.

Climate data for Birr (1979–2008 normals, extremes 1881–2009)
Month	Jan	Feb	Mar	Apr	May	Jun	Jul	Aug	Sep	Oct	Nov	Dec	Year
Record high °C (°F)	15.0 (59.0)	15.6 (60.1)	21.7 (71.1)	23.7 (74.7)	25.7 (78.3)	31.2 (88.2)	30.8 (87.4)	29.4 (84.9)	26.6 (79.9)	23.3 (73.9)	17.9 (64.2)	15.6 (60.1)	31.2 (88.2)
Mean daily maximum °C (°F)	8.1 (46.6)	8.6 (47.5)	10.3 (50.5)	12.6 (54.7)	15.5 (59.9)	17.8 (64.0)	19.6 (67.3)	19.3 (66.7)	17.1 (62.8)	13.6 (56.5)	10.4 (50.7)	8.6 (47.5)	13.5 (56.3)
Daily mean °C (°F)	5.1 (41.2)	5.3 (41.5)	6.8 (44.2)	8.4 (47.1)	11.0 (51.8)	13.6 (56.5)	15.6 (60.1)	15.3 (59.5)	13.2 (55.8)	10.1 (50.2)	7.2 (45.0)	5.6 (42.1)	9.8 (49.6)
Mean daily minimum °C (°F)	2.0 (35.6)	2.0 (35.6)	3.3 (37.9)	4.3 (39.7)	6.6 (43.9)	9.5 (49.1)	11.6 (52.9)	11.3 (52.3)	9.3 (48.7)	6.6 (43.9)	4.0 (39.2)	2.7 (36.9)	6.1 (43.0)
Record low °C (°F)	−15.6 (3.9)	−12.9 (8.8)	−10.5 (13.1)	−6.7 (19.9)	−3.3 (26.1)	−0.3 (31.5)	2.7 (36.9)	1.2 (34.2)	−1.9 (28.6)	−7.8 (18.0)	−9.4 (15.1)	−12.3 (9.9)	−15.6 (3.9)
Average precipitation mm (inches)	78.8 (3.10)	58.6 (2.31)	67.4 (2.65)	55.0 (2.17)	59.5 (2.34)	66.5 (2.62)	59.4 (2.34)	81.6 (3.21)	66.4 (2.61)	94.2 (3.71)	74.7 (2.94)	83.8 (3.30)	845.7 (33.30)
Average precipitation days (≥ 1.0 mm)	14	11	14	11	12	11	11	12	11	14	13	13	147
Average snowy days	3.5	2.6	2.5	0.8	0.2	0.0	0.0	0.0	0.0	0.0	0.2	1.9	11.7
Average relative humidity (%) (at 15:00 LST)	82.4	75.6	71.6	65.1	64.7	66.2	67.5	68.5	70.3	76.1	81.1	84.5	72.8
Mean monthly sunshine hours	46.5	62.2	89.9	135.0	158.1	129.0	120.9	124.0	105.0	89.9	57.0	43.4	1,168.8
Mean daily sunshine hours	1.5	2.2	2.9	4.5	5.1	4.3	3.9	4.0	3.5	2.9	1.9	1.4	3.2
Source: Met Éireann

== See also ==
- List of towns and villages in Ireland
- Market Houses in Ireland
