= Victoria Lock (River Shannon) =

Canal lock in Clonahenoge, County Offaly, Ireland

Coordinates: 53.1674907°N 8.0796748°W

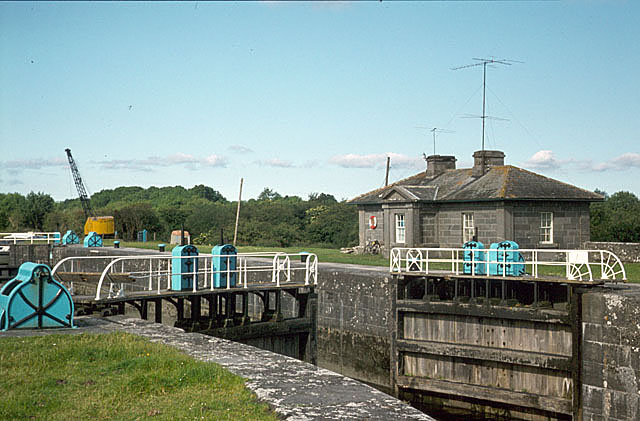
Meelick Lock on the River Shannon

Victoria Lock, also known as Meelick Lock, is the first lock on the River Shannon upstream of Lough Derg, it is situated between Meelick, County Galway and Clonahenoge, County Offaly where the Little Brosna River enters the Shannon. It is very near the tripoint where the provinces of Munster, Leinster and Connacht meet. The lock is of architectural and technical interest and is listed on the Nation Inventory of Architectural Heritage, the dimensions are 142 ft x 40 ft. Thomas Rhodes on the instructions of the Shannon Commissioners constructed the lock in the 1840s as part of a widescale upgrade of the Shannon Navigation. The lock is still in use today by pleasure craft, both private and fleets of rental cruisers who use the River Shannon and the connecting canals. A second lock, Hamilton Lock is also located nearby but is now disused.

== Protected status ==
Offaly County Council lists both the lock and the lock keepers cottage on its Record of Protected Structures (ref 38-05 & 38-04).

The lock is recorded by the National Inventory of Architectural Heritage as being of special interest in the architectural and technical interest categories in addition to being significant for its size. The lock leepers house is similarly described as being of special interest in the architectural and technical interest categories.
